= William Botsford Jarvis =

Sheriff of York, Upper Canada and politician

The Honourable William Botsford Jarvis
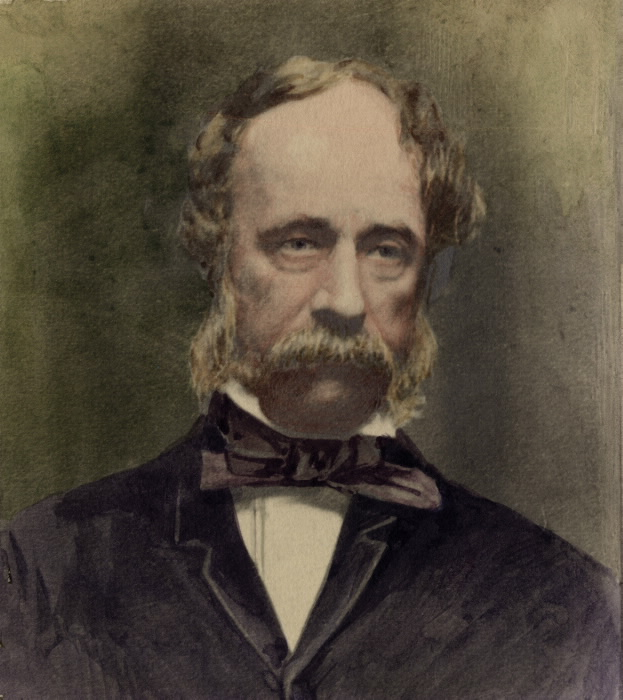

Member of the 11th Parliament of Upper Canada for York
- In office 1830–1834

High Sheriff of the Home District of York, Upper Canada

Personal details
- Born: May 4, 1799 Fredericton, New Brunswick
- Died: July 26, 1864 (aged 65) Toronto
- Party: Family Compact
- Relations: George Stephen Benjamin Jarvis (brother)

William Botsford Jarvis (May 4, 1799 – July 26, 1864) was an important member of the Family Compact and Sheriff of the Home District. His estate in what was then York, Upper Canada, gave its name to Rosedale, Toronto. Jarvis Street was named for his cousin, Samuel.

== Birth ==
Born in Fredericton, New Brunswick, he was the son of United Empire Loyalists from Danbury, Connecticut and named for his father's friend, William Botsford. His father, Lt-Colonel Stephen Jarvis (1756–1840) of the 17th Regiment of Light Dragoons, became Adjutant-General to the Forces in Upper Canada and Gentleman Usher of the Black Rod to the Parliament of Canada. Colonel Jarvis had fought with the British during the American Revolutionary War, but was captured by the Americans in his home town at Connecticut. He escaped in a canoe to Long Island, rejoining the British forces there. After the war he joined some cousins in New Brunswick, where William was born, before being persuaded to move to York, Upper Canada in 1809 by one of them, 'the incompetent and dishonest' William Jarvis.

== Business and politics ==
William Botsford Jarvis had 'a gregarious and outgoing personality'. He founded Yorkville, Toronto, with the entrepreneur Joseph Bloor, and he was involved in the incorporation of a number of companies in the Toronto area, including the Victoria Mining Company in 1856.

In 1827, he was the choice of the Family Compact to be Sheriff of the Home District, and was duly elected. In 1837, as sheriff, he stopped William Lyon Mackenzie and his rebels during Upper Canada Rebellion from entering York, Upper Canada, forcing them back to engage at the Battle of Montgomery's Tavern. After the rebellion was repressed, he presided over the executions of Peter Matthews and Samuel Lount, even though it was Lount who had stopped the rebels burning Jarvis's home. Mackenzie and Jarvis were bitter enemies, and Mackenzie was intent on burning Rosedale to the ground, but Jarvis' wife and two of her sick children were in the house, and it was Lount who declared to the rebels that he was not there to fight women and sick children. Jarvis served as sheriff until 1856.

In 1830, he was elected to the 11th Parliament of Upper Canada for the town of York, Upper Canada; he was defeated in 1834. He served as sheriff in the Richmond Hill area for some years and led, or at least helped, Tories and member of the Orange Order who brutally disrupted a reformers' public discussion of Lord Durham's Report in 1839. (Reformer David Leppard was killed during the violence.)

Jarvis was elected to the town council for Toronto in 1841, but resigned the following year.

Jarvis died at his home, Rosedale, in 1864.

== Rosedale ==
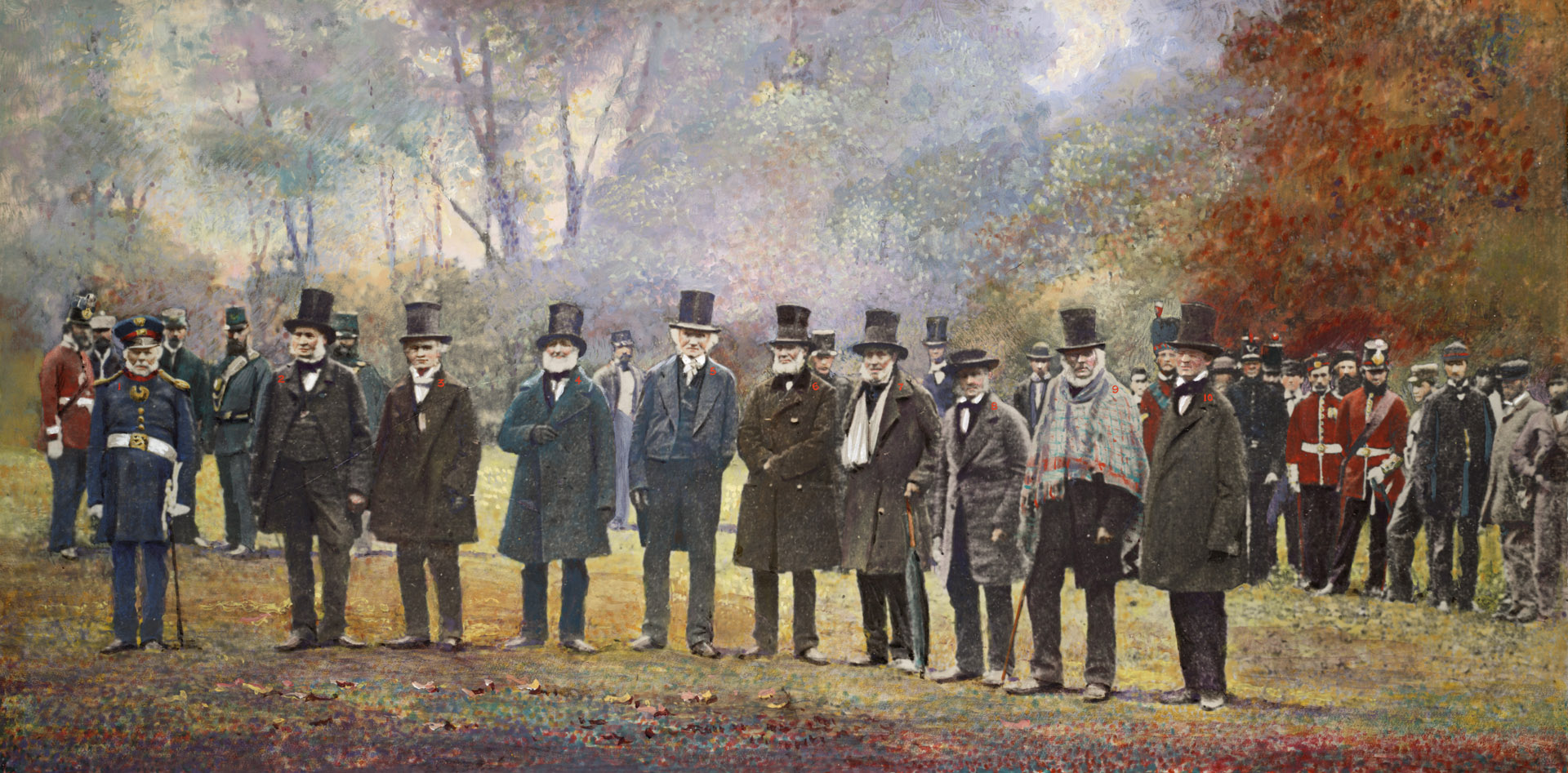
Veterans of the War of 1812 at "Rosedale", Jarvis' estate, on 23 October 1861

The Rosedale neighbourhood of Toronto was named after Jarvis' residence, Rosedale House, which formerly occupied that area. The house, which overlooked Castle Frank Brook (a tributary of the Don River), was "a wonderful rambling villa perched on the edge of a ravine... with a wildflower garden, a conservatory full of hothouse flowers, and, the envy of Toronto, a magnificent curving double staircase that descended to a foyer panelled in richest walnut." Two new wings were added to either side of the house (around 1830) containing a peach house, a grape house, bedrooms, a morning room and a large verandah. Orchards, quiet arbours, rose gardens and masses of flowers surrounded the house, which was named by Jarvis' wife Mary (granddaughter of William Dummer Powell) for the wild roses that grew so abundantly throughout the estate.

== Family ==
William Jarvis married Mary Boyles Powell (1803–1852), in 1828. She was brought up by her grandfather, Chief Justice William Dummer Powell, and his wife, Anne Murray. The Jarvis' were the parents of five children:

- Anne Frances Jarvis (1830–1919), married Edmund Allen Meredith, for whom Meredith Crescent in Rosedale is named.
- Louisa Jarvis (1831–1906), married (Daniel) Augustus Nanton (1831–1873), and were the parents of Sir Augustus Meredith Nanton.
- Lt.-Colonel William Dummer Jarvis (1834–1914) of the 12th York Rangers and afterwards the Royal Canadian Mounted Police. He married Margaret, daughter of William Parker Ranney H.E.I.C.S., of Topsham, Devon.
- Sarah Harriet Jarvis (1836–1897), married in 1854 Lewis William Ord, a first cousin of Major-General Sir Harry St. George Ord, and the son of Major Robert Hutchinson Ord (1789–1829) of the Royal Horse Artillery.
- Lt.-Colonel Robert Edward Colborne Jarvis (1842–1903) of the 67th Leinster Regiment. He was attached to the Staff College at the Royal Military College, Sandhurst. He then served with the Red Cross Ambulance Corps throughout the Franco-Prussian War, and was awarded by the French government in recognition of his services with one of only two gold crosses made. He served on the staff of Frederick Roberts, 1st Earl Roberts during the Second Anglo-Afghan War, and was one of the lucky few to survive the infamous withdrawal through the Khyber Pass. He later served in South Africa. Though 'an elegant young man, a very lady-killer', he died unmarried.
