= Edmund Allen Meredith =

Irish-Canadian lawyer

Edmund Allen Meredith CMG
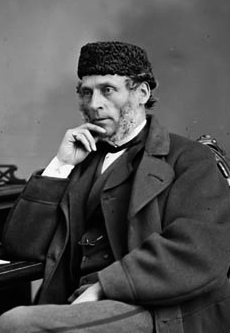
- Meredith in 1869

Under Secretary of State for Canada
- In office 1847–1867
- Preceded by: Christopher Dunkin
- Succeeded by: John Stoughton Dennis

Principal of McGill University
- In office 1846–1853
- Preceded by: John Bethune
- Succeeded by: Charles Dewey Day

Personal details
- Born: 7 October 1817 Ardtrea, County Tyrone, Ireland
- Died: 2 January 1899 (aged 81) Toronto, Ontario; Canada
- Education: Trinity College, Dublin

Edmund Allen Meredith CMG (7 October 1817 – 2 January 1899) was an Irish lawyer whose career was in public service in Canada. He was Under Secretary of State for Canada; a prison reformer, writer, president of the Literary and Historical Society of Quebec and the third principal of McGill University from 1846 to 1853. The diary he kept from 1844 until his death is preserved in the National Archives of Canada and formed the basis for the first half of Sandra Gwyn's book The Private Capital: Ambition and Love in the Age of Macdonald and Laurier (1985), which the CBC later made into a television series.

== Early life in Ireland ==
Born at Ardtrea House, County Tyrone, 7 October 1817, he was the fourth son of Rev. Thomas Meredith and Elizabeth Maria Graves (1791–1855), the eldest daughter of Richard Graves, Dean of Ardagh. He was named after his aunt's (Martha Meredith's) husband, "that eccentric genius, the late truly learned and honest" (Christopher) Edmund Allen (1776–1826) LL.D, of Riverview, County Cavan and Cookstown House, County Louth; formerly Regius Professor of Common Law at Trinity College, Dublin. He was a brother of Sir William Collis Meredith and first cousins with Sir Richard Graves MacDonnell, Francis Brinkley, Admiral Richard Charles Mayne, John Dawson Mayne, Major-General Arthur Robert MacDonnell, Sir James Creed Meredith and John Walsingham Cooke Meredith. The last named was the father of The Eight London Merediths, who included among them Sir William Ralph Meredith, one of the Pall-bearers at his funeral. Meredith was the uncle and godfather to both Sir Augustus Meredith Nanton and Frederick Edmund Meredith.

Meredith's father died suddenly and mysteriously in 1819, and his mother's second marriage led her to Lower Canada from 1824 until 1832. She took four of her children, but left the other three, including Meredith, in Ireland. He was left in the care of his celebrated uncle, Robert James Graves, and his third wife Anna Grogan. Predominantly brought up by Graves' elderly housekeeper, in 1827 he was sent to Castleknock, a boarding school outside of Dublin. In 1833, he entered Trinity College, Dublin, winning a classical scholarship in his second year and prizes in political economy and science. After graduating (B.A. and M.A. degree) he entered Lincoln's Inn, London and then King's Inns, Dublin, to study law (becoming a Doctor of Laws).

== Canada ==
While still at King's Inns, he was interested to see how his estranged brothers and sisters lived in Canada and so he embarked on a voyage there in 1842. He stayed with his elder brother, William Collis Meredith at what is now known as Notman House in Montreal, and briefly resumed his study of law at his brother's offices. He returned to Ireland in 1843 to be called to the Irish Bar, but later that year returned to Montreal, invited to do so by William.

In his first diary entry of that year, Meredith talks of his decision to leave Ireland for Canada, revealing his personal angst over the upheaval: "It now seems strange to me that I could have dreamed, even for an instant, of banishing myself from the society of my brother (Richard - Secretary of the Literary Association of the Friends of Poland), and setting up on my own account among complete strangers."

In Montreal, he became a member of the Shakespeare Club, a meeting of which was painted by fellow member Cornelius Krieghoff in 1847. Meredith is depicted along with other members including future Judge Frederick William Torrance, Sir Allan Napier MacNab and John Young (Canadian politician). In 1846 his brother, William, had used his influence to secure him the unpaid but prestigious position of Principal of McGill University in Montreal, a position he held until 1853.

(Meredith) was tall (five foot eleven), very slim (one hundred and sixty-five pounds), and distinguished in appearance - his hazel eyes were most expressive, and his jet black hair set off his charming face. His manner was easy and courteous, his voice one to coax the birds off the bough, and his dark blue suit of Broadcloth was in excellent taste and worn with an air.... For all his good looks and cleverness, Meredith's lonely and uncertain childhood had left him with a self-doubting diffidence, a certain lack of mettle that would leave him, in the end, somewhat disappointed and unfulfilled. But in the beginning, as a clever young barrister with a natural flair for fun and games, and an Irish talent for making friends, he and Canada got on like a house on fire. Though a late-bloomer on skates, he turned out to be a whizz at hockey, playing on the frozen St. Lawrence... More significantly for his career, he also developed a notable flair for administration and quiet diplomacy.

While at McGill, Edmund Meredith played in one of the earliest games of ice hockey to have been described. It took place in the 1850s and thirty years later was written up in the Montreal Star:

Strange as it may appear to McGill men and others, there was a great hockey match played in Quebec in the early fifties, when the first principal Dr Edmund Meredith (in fact he was the third principal of McGill University), brother of the late Chief Justice Sir Wm. Meredith of Quebec, who was a very fast skater, might have been called a forward, as might have been his old chum, the late E.H. Steel, while the late Grant Powell (a cousin of Edmund’s wife, Frances Jarvis) was the captain. Their opponents were the Civil Service Club, of Quebec. The hockey sticks were cut from the Gorna Bush; the puck was a piece of oak, and the goals were a mile and a half apart on clear ice, not often found between Quebec and the Island of Orleans. The Quebec Chronicle of that day had a good account of the match.

— Montreal Star, "Thirty Years Ago Today"

== Career ==
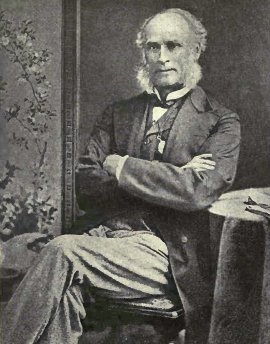
Meredith as president of the Literary and Historical Society of Quebec, 1855

During his tenure at McGill University he joined the civil service and moved with the government to Quebec, becoming Under Secretary of State for Canada in Sir John A. Macdonald's government. When the new capital, Ottawa, was founded in 1865, much to his disappointment, he and the rest of the government were forced to move there, writing "the more I see of Ottawa, the more do I dislike and detest it." He was described as ‘one of the outstanding civil servants of his generation’, even if he was "destined to be a man forever ahead of his time." In 1870, John Young, 1st Baron Lisgar offered to Meredith the Chief-Justiceship of St. Lucia, which he declined.

Meredith is best remembered for his role in prison reform, of which he was an active exponent. Following the British North America Act, in 1867 he was appointed the Inspector then Chairman of the Board of Inspectors of Asylums and Prisons etc. Concerning his work on Prison Reform, the Montreal Gazette reported,

Mr Meredith deserves thanks that in this as in other directions he is labouring to promote social and educational reforms. We are happy in having men in the public service whose hearts are so thoroughly in their work as he has shown his is in the giant task of the amendment of our disgraceful prison life and prison discipline, and in cognate subjects.

He founded the Ottawa Art Association, served as president of the Literary and Historical Society of Quebec, the Park Lawn Tennis Club (Toronto), the Civil Service Board, the Ottawa Literary and Scientific Society, and Vice-President of the Astronomical and Physical Society of Toronto, and finally the part-time position in retirement as Vice-President of the Toronto Loans and Assurance Company (a.k.a. Toronto General Trusts).

He wrote and published numerous articles and pamphlets, including "An Essay on the Oregon Question (1846)"; "Influence of Recent Gold Discoveries on Prices" (1856); "An Important but Neglected Branch of Social Science" (1861); "Note on some Emendations (not hitherto suggested) in the text of Shakspeare, with a new explanation of an old passage" (1863); "Glance at the Present State of the Common Goals of Canada; the individual separation of prisoners (with shortened sentences), recommended on moral and economic grounds" (1864); "Earth Sewage versus Water Sewage", and even a pamphlet on militia training in schools, though he himself did not enjoy "playing at soldiers." His writings, A Trip from Boston to Montreal in 1844 was published in 1925 by his eldest daughter Mary Meredith.

Meredith was awarded an honorary M.A., from Bishop's University, and that of LL.D., from McGill University. He was an honorary member of the American Association for the Promotion of Social Science. In 1854, he spent several weeks making use of the Leviathan of Parsonstown as the guest of his friend William Parsons, 3rd Earl of Rosse, at Birr Castle.

== Family ==
At Rosedale, 17 July 1851 ("the sun shone in unclouded majesty and we had the most delightful breeze"), Meredith married Anne Frances (Fanny) Jarvis (1830–1919), the eldest and favourite daughter of William Botsford Jarvis of Rosedale by his wife, the granddaughter of William Dummer Powell, Mary Boyles Powell. Rosedale, Toronto, previously the Jarvis' 120-acre (0.49 km^{2}) estate is now Toronto's wealthiest residential district. After living in Quebec City and Ottawa, Meredith was finally able to retire to Toronto after a long-awaited 'handsome inheritance' from his Aunt Bella came through from Ireland in 1879. On what had been the apple orchard of the original Rosedale they made their new home, 'a spacious, white-brick house of twenty two rooms', where he died 12 January 1899. Meredith Crescent in Rosedale, Toronto is named for him. The Merediths were the parents of eight children:

- Mary Meredith (b. 1856), lived to old age but died unmarried.
- Alice Louisa Meredith (b.1858), married Archibald Duncan McLean, grandson of her maternal grandfather's old friend, Chief Justice Archibald McLean.
- Maude Meredith (1860–62), died an infant.
- Arthur Jarvis Meredith (1862-1895), went out to Edmonton, Alberta with his first cousin, Sir Augustus Meredith Nanton, where he died. He married Isabella Osler, niece of Sir William Osler and Sir Edmund Osler. After her husband died, she and their children (who included Allen Osler Meredith) lived with her uncle, Edmund at Toronto.
- Ethel Colborne Meredith (1865—1922), married a distant cousin, Ernest Frederick Jarvis.
- Clarence Meredith, died an infant in 1868.
- Morna Irvine Meredith (b.1871), married Rev. Alfred Reid. They were the parents of Escott Reid C.C.
- Lt.-Colonel Colborne Powell Meredith was Commissioner of the Ottawa Improvement Commission; President of the Ontario Architects Association;, and Councillor of the Royal Architectural Institute of Canada. He designed many of the principal buildings and residences in Ottawa, including the Château Laurier Hotel, as well as a number of schools and convents throughout Canada. From 1925 to 1934 Colborne Meredith served as General-Secretary to the League of Nations Society of Canada. He married Emily Griffin of Ottawa. They are the great-grandparents of Anna Meredith.

Meredith's wife had enjoyed "a blessed childhood, with love on all sides", though she was undoubtedly spoilt as the eldest and prettiest daughter. In 1835, to celebrate her fifth birthday, her mother planted a sapling which has since grown into the famous Rosedale Elm. When she was seven she crept out of bed to witness "a magnificent masquerade ball (at Rosedale) that a whole generation of Toronto party-goers would hold benchmark the rest of their lives." She loved horses, keeping two for her carriage and another for cross country adventures, when she would sport a low-crowned beaver hat with a green veil. Her summers were filled with constant riding parties and picnics, including 'a never-to-be-forgotten adventure: Bark canoes paddled by Indians through five miles (8 km) of rapids', whilst on a visit to cousins at Hawkesbury, Ontario on the Ottawa River. She spent two years at finishing school in Paris (where she was delighted to witness the barricades being flung up in the streets during the French Revolution of 1848) before returning to Canada to spend the winter of 1848/49 in Montreal with the family of Edmund's brother, Sir William Collis Meredith, beginning her courtship with Meredith.

Of all the faces of Edmund Meredith to be found in the family papers, by far the most beguiling is Meredith the paterfamilias. Unlike Fanny, who was sadly self-centred and who also had a lamentable tendency to be fussily over-protective, Edmund was a relaxed, confident parent, never happier than when horsing around 'having a capital time with my chicks' (as when playing battledore and shuttlecocks down the length of the dining room with his seven-year-old son, in his seventies)... His son Coly remembered 'Unlike the typical Victorian father he never ordered me to do anything, when he wanted something done, one knew that it should be done... At times the confusion made by small children must have been trying, but he never lost his temper or showed irritation. When one considers his own very lonely life as a child, one marvels at his being able to become such a perfect father.

— Sandra Gwynn, The Private Capital

== Writings ==
- Glance at the Present State of the Common Goals of Canada, 1864
- Earth Sewage versus Water Sewage, 1868

== Photographs ==
- The Gate Lodge to Ardtrea House, Co. Tyrone
- Edmund Allen Meredith with his family at their home in Toronto c.1890
- Frances Anne (Jarvis) Meredith in 1865
- Daughter Mary Meredith (1856-1924) in fancy dress, 1876
- William Botsford Jarvis's cousin, William Jarvis (1756-1817) with his family
- Edmund Allen Meredith, 1863
- Edmund Allen Meredith, 1869
- Edmund Allen Meredith, 1868
