= Augustus Meredith Nanton =

Investor and developer of Western Canada

Sir Augustus Nanton
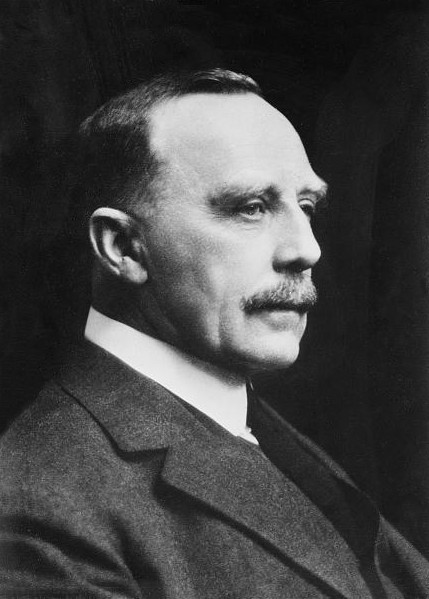
- Born: 7 May 1860; Toronto, Canada West
- Died: 24 April 1925 (aged 64); Toronto
- Known for: Developer of Winnipeg and the Canadian West

Sir Augustus Meredith Nanton (7 May 1860 – 24 April 1925) was one of the principal investors and developers of Western Canada, particularly at Winnipeg, Vancouver and Calgary. In the Canadian West, the town of Nanton, Alberta is named for him, and twelve cities and towns have streets named 'Nanton'. Committed to victory in the Great War, he gave over half of his fortune to the war effort and worked himself to an early grave supporting Canadian soldiers in Europe while maintaining Winnipeg's economy. In recognition of his war services he was knighted by George V in 1917 and made a Knight of the Order of St. John of Jerusalem. He died in office as President of The Dominion Bank in Toronto, but is most closely associated with Winnipeg, his home for over forty years and where he is buried.

== Early life in Toronto ==
Born in 1860, he was the second son of (Daniel) Augustus Nanton (1831–1873) and his wife Louisa (1831-1906), daughter of William Botsford Jarvis of Rosedale. His middle name was for his uncle and godfather, Edmund Allen Meredith. Nanton's father, a barrister and partner of Sir Alexander Tilloch Galt, had emigrated from England where he had been educated at Eton and Oxford. But in Canada the father became an hopeless alcoholic and died at an early age leaving behind a widow, five young children and heavy debts. His mother, who had been to finishing school in Paris, survived by teaching French and taking charity from her sister, Mrs Meredith, and their family friend, Sir Casimir Gzowski.

At the age of thirteen, Nanton took the decision to leave school and find employment to help support his family. He worked as an office boy in the brokerage firm of Pellatt & Osler of Toronto, earning $300 a year. At the same time, he took a job cleaning a grocery store for $200 a year, sleeping under the counter to act as a night watchman. This income helped his mother with her debts and when still a teenager he paid for his brother (the future Brigadier-General Herbert Colborne Nanton R.E., who married a daughter of Sir Henri-Gustave Joly de Lotbinière) to attend the Royal Military College of Canada. He also found the time to join The Queen's Own Rifles of Canada, row with the Argonaut Rowing Club and crew aboard a yacht at Oakville. In 1881, Nanton acted as Best man at the marriage of his employer's son, Sir Henry Pellatt of Casa Loma.

== Developing the Canadian West ==
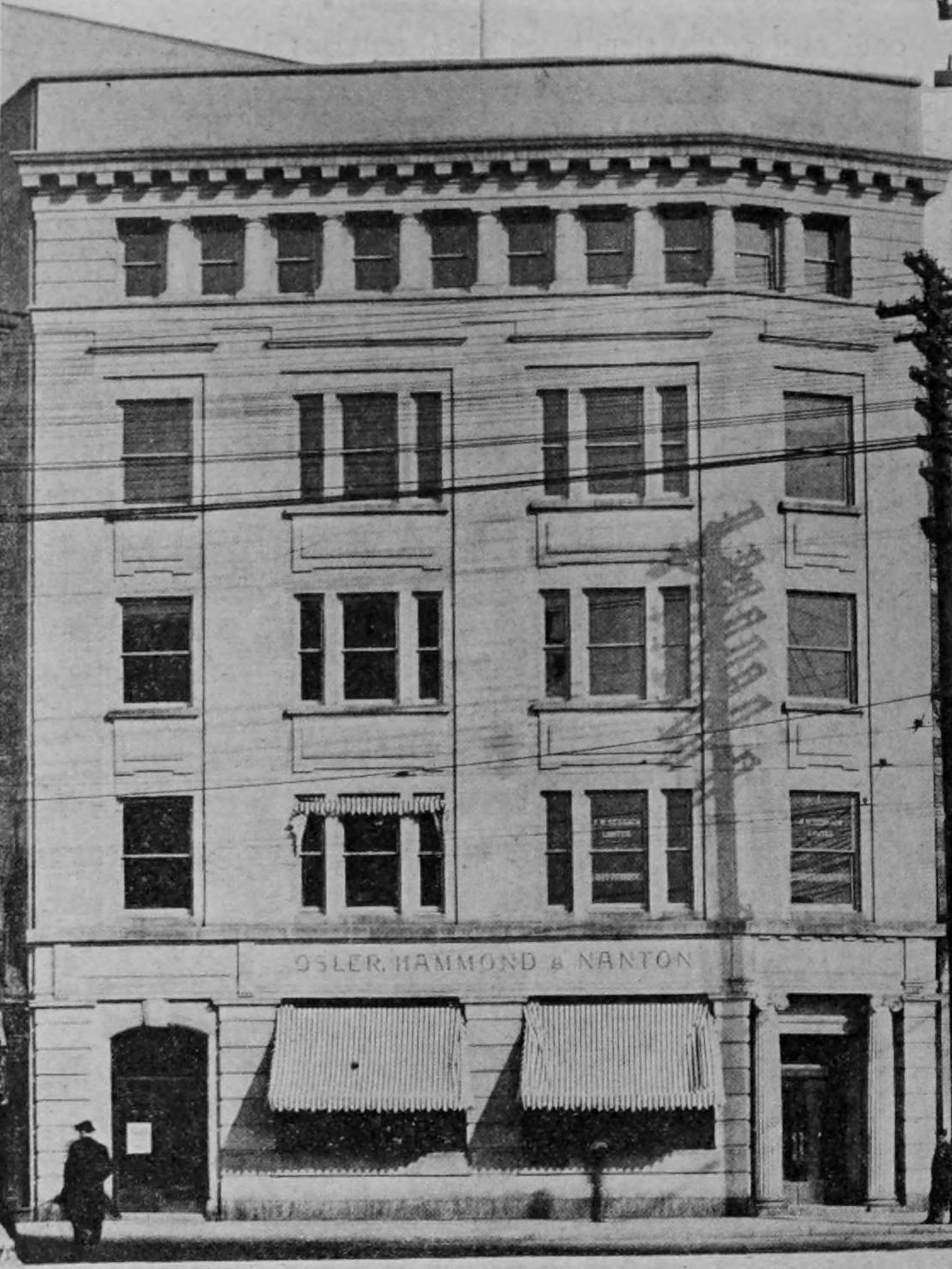
The Osler, Hammond & Nanton Building at Portage and Main in Winnipeg, designed by Darling & Pearson

The firm for which he worked had since become known as Osler & Hammond, and the decision was made to invest in the Canadian West, which required opening an office in Winnipeg. Under the control of the head offices in Toronto and Aberdeen, the firm of Osler, Hammond & Nanton was created with Nanton as resident partner in Winnipeg. It was not an easy start, and at first Nanton was severely disappointed by the lack of the branch's growth, but he didn't give up and by 1896 the North of Scotland shareholders were told that the subsidiary firm in Winnipeg had become "the largest and best mortgage business in the west".

Osler, Hammond & Nanton entered the Canadian West representing a considerable fortune, but their business was not centred on quick profits. The company came to represent standards of scrupulous honesty and thoroughness from which they never deviated and became an important link between financiers in Britain, Montreal and Toronto in the development of the young Canadian west. Under Nanton, the firm purchased land for building 'feeder' rail lines which they also financed and then acted as agents in selling them to the Canadian Pacific Railway. By 1900, the firm acted as agents for the sale of Galt Coal (founded by Nanton's father's former business partner) throughout the Canadian Prairies and, in the first year, sold 50,000 tons. Through this connection Nanton also became managing director of the Galt Alberta Railway (Galt Historic Railway Park) & Irrigation Company. In 1902, he concluded the sale of 800,000 acres in Saskatchewan, a deal worth several million dollars, solely on the basis of his personal handshake, testament to his solid reputation.

By the early 20th century, Nanton was a director of about thirty corporations and associations. He took the greatest pride in sitting on the boards of the "World's Greatest Transportation Company", the Canadian Pacific Railway, and on the oldest commercial organization in the world, the Hudson's Bay Company. On the board of the CPR, he joined F. E. Meredith, with whom he shared the same uncle and godfather in Edmund Allen Meredith. Nanton was one of a small group of Winnipeg businessmen who directed the massive financing of and servicing for the influx of over a million settlers then pouring into the newly opened Canadian West.

== War service ==
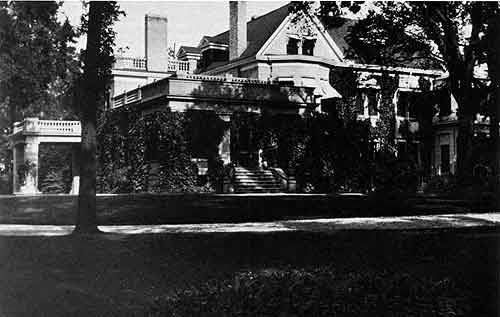
Kilmorie, Nanton's home in Winnipeg

Within days of the outbreak of war, the Canadian Patriotic Fund was formed to help the dependants of those enlisting. Nanton became the president of the Manitoba Patriotic Fund (MPF), raising more, per capita, in the first year alone than any other Canadian Province. Of the $6 million raised by the MPF during the War, under Nanton only two per cent of that sum was used for administration costs and expenses. Nanton was known to get up in the night and personally drive wives and their children to hospitals to see their wounded husbands back from Europe. When the son of a Winnipeg family was lying severely wounded in a military hospital in England, Nanton anonymously arranged for a telegram to be sent each morning to the parents, reporting on their boy's condition. He was quite embarrassed when it was discovered he was responsible.

In 1917, Nanton was among those who forwarded the campaign led by Sir Frederick Borden to raise conscription and lead the successful Victory Loan Campaigns. Nanton was Chairman of the Manitoba Victory Loan Committee and the only westerner on the Dominion Executive. He set up committees across the Canadian Prairies and Manitoba ended up raising $32 million in 1917, at an average of $71 per head over the national average of $58 per head, making Manitoba the talk of Victory Loan Headquarters in Toronto. Despite the 1918 flu pandemic coupled with atrocious Blizzards, the three Victory Loan campaigns saw increasing investment each year and in total Manitoba raised $120 million for the war effort, spirited by Nanton.

During World War I, Nanton gave over half of his money to the war effort. He transformed the upstairs of his home, Kilmorie, and the ballroom was occupied for three days a week with women knitting and sewing tons of socks, sweaters and scarves, etc., to be shipped to the men of the Royal Winnipeg Rifles in France. Downstairs, Nanton opened his doors every night to an average of thirty men at one time from The Royal Regina Rifles while they were in training at Winnipeg. They were served sandwiches and cocoa, and were free to enjoy the use of the entertainments that he had provided for them which included two bowling alleys, a shooting gallery, use of his full-sized English billiard table, ping pong and tables for Bridge.

In 1917, Sir Augustus and Lady Nanton converted their summer house on the Lake of the Woods into a convalescent home for wounded soldiers returning from Europe. They insisted that the staff be supplied from the Tuxedo Military Hospital, but that everything else was supplied by them. The 'Lady Nanton Convalescent Home' remained fully staffed for fifty soldiers until 1920, seeing 800 soldiers through its doors.

== Winnipeg General Strike ==
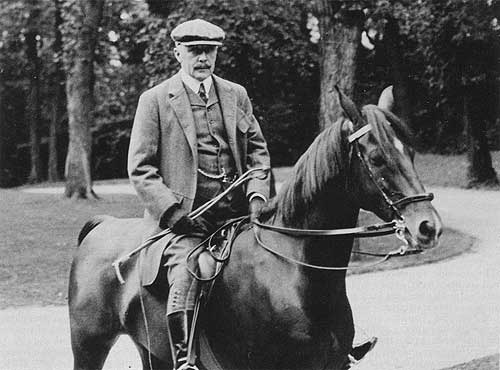
Sir Augustus Nanton in Winnipeg

A source of great personal sadness for Nanton was the Winnipeg General Strike that followed not even a year after peace in Europe was announced. As the city's leading financier and President of Winnipeg Electric he was the leading employer in the city. Despite his efforts to grow Winnipeg from its roots before the war and to support Canadian soldiers – particularly those from Manitoba – during the war, he became a figure of contempt to many. Not only did the supporters of the Labour Party of Canada who had argued against Conscription turn against him, but also many of the soldiers he had supported rallied against him when they returned home to find their jobs had been given up.

Nanton joined with other business leaders to keep open the essential services to Winnipeg that the strikers had closed. At one mass meeting Nanton was physically attacked and a man cried out to the crowd to burn his house down. In consequence he sent his wife and daughters to sleep with friends while he and his staff took turns to patrol the grounds of Kilmorie during the night. No attack was made at Kilmorie, but the barn on his farm at Rosser was purposefully burned to the ground and twenty of his horses were killed.

In 1923, Nanton was asked to chair the non-profit Canada Colonization Association. Still exhausted from his exertions during the war, Nanton wanted to decrease his responsibilities but he accepted the position anyway, seen as the only man who could pull the committee together, a proof of his enduring reputation.

== Return to Toronto and Death ==
Sir Edmund Osler, the man who had recognised Nanton's talents from the very start and nurtured him throughout his business career, died in August 1924. Though kept unknown to those around him, Nanton knew he was a sick man. Nanton was unanimously elected as Osler's successor, and never one to shirk duty, Nanton accepted.

The Nantons were reluctant to leave Winnipeg, their home of over four decades. Lady Nanton was presented with a letter of appreciation signed by the 'Women of Winnipeg', forty-one pages in all. The Nantons returned to his native Toronto later that year and took up office as president of the Dominion Bank and senior partner of Osler, Hammond & Nanton. He struggled through the bank's annual meeting in January 1925, calling for greater communication and collaboration between eastern and western Canada, but it was the last duty he would perform. Nanton briefly returned to Winnipeg to attend the Board of Trade dinner in his honour. The final speaker, his friend George Allan, the first man he had met on arriving in Winnipeg in 1883, gave this outline of his contribution to the Canadian West:

You were active in the sales, settlement, irrigation and improvement of our lands, in the laying out and selling of our town sites, in the marketing and milling of our grains, in the development of our livestock industry, in the opening of our mines, in the utilization of our forests, in the construction and operation of our steam and electric railways and electric plants, in the manufacture and sale of building material, machinery and implements, in the establishment and work of our banking, trust, loan, insurance and other financial corporations. Confidence in you led the investing public of older Canada, England and Scotland to provide capital so necessary for this new country. You built up a large business in the fields of brokerage, loaning, insurance and finance. In fact it is difficult to name any field of creative work which has not been benefited by your thought and care, and your associates bear glad testimony to the pleasure it has been to work with you ... We thank you warmly for what you have done for our city, our province, our country and our Empire ...

When Nanton's death was announced every flagpole visible in Winnipeg carried a flag at half mast and office buildings across Canada followed suit. The CPR supplied a special train to bring his remains, his family and business friends from Toronto to Winnipeg for the funeral service. A guard of honour of six hundred Winnipeg Electric employees lined the street leading from St. Luke's Church. His wife and children returned to their home at Kilmorie and continued to live there.

== Family ==
In 1886, Nanton married his first wife, Georgina Hope Hespeler, daughter of The Hon. William Hespeler. She died the following year giving birth to their daughter, Mary Georgina, who went on to marry Douglas Lorn Cameron, son of Sir Douglas Cameron, 8th Lieutenant Governor of Manitoba. He was married again in 1894, to Ethel Constance Clark of Winnipeg, and they had three sons, Edward, Augustus and Paul and two daughters, Constance and Marguerite Meredith Nanton, married Malcolm Trustram Eve, 1st Baron Silsoe. In 1900, Nanton built his home, 'Kilmorie', then outside Winnipeg, on the Assiniboine River. However, representing its rapid growth, by 1912 the house was enveloped by the city and has since been demolished. The house had a gatelodge (demolished January 2020) and large stables for Nanton's beloved horses. Between 1919 and 1924, the Nantons hosted dinner parties and balls on three separate occasions for the future King Edward VIII.
