= Rosedale Presbyterian Church =

Presbyterian Church in Toronto, Ontario, Canada

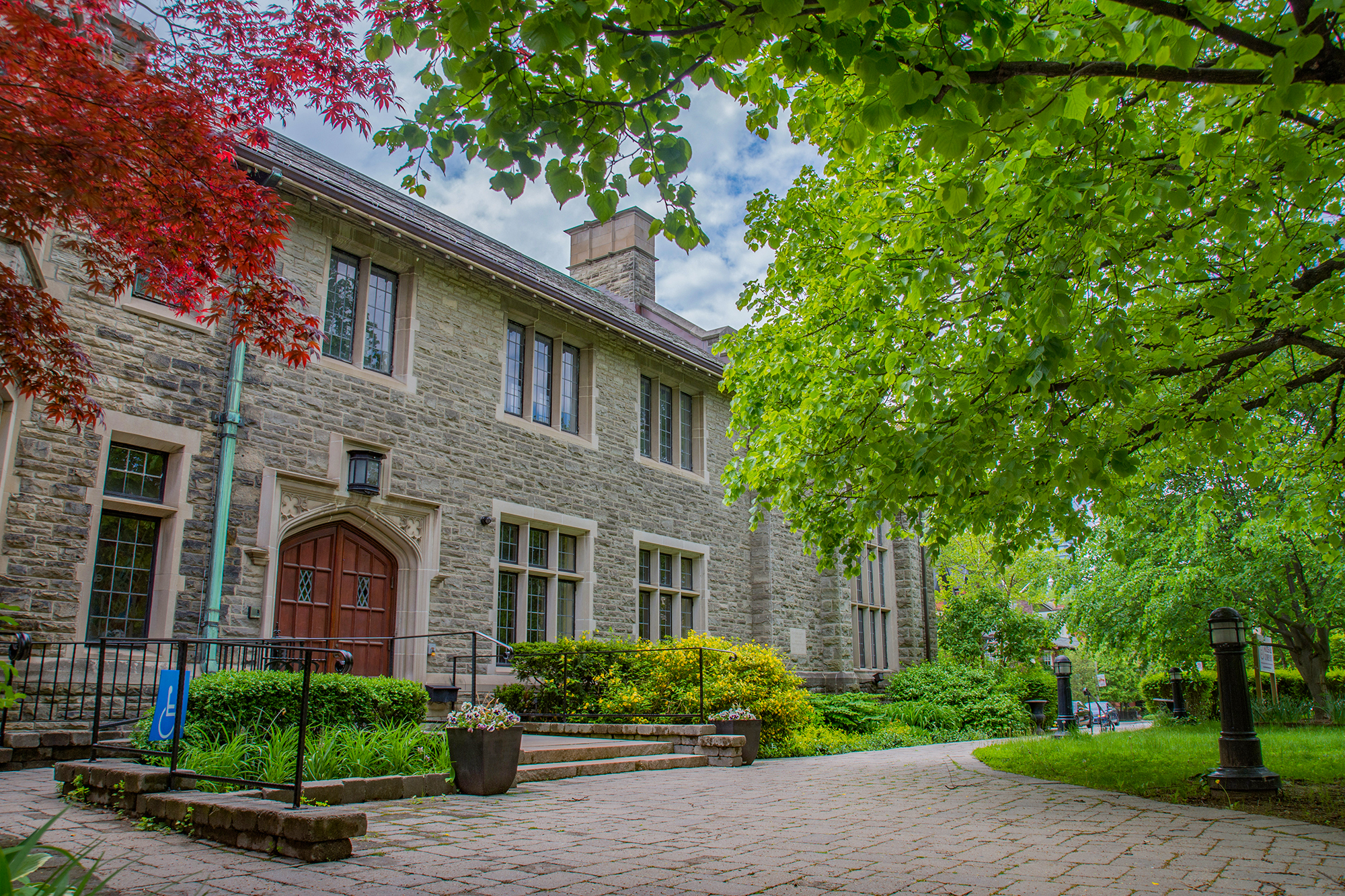
- The front view of Rosedale Presbyterian Church building
- Rosedale Presbyterian Church
- 43°40′33″N 79°22′48″W
- Location: 129 Mount Pleasant Road; Toronto, Ontario; M4W 2S3
- Denomination: Presbyterian
- Website: www.rosedalepresbyterianchurch.ca

History
- Status: Active
- Founded: 1907

Rosedale Presbyterian Church is a congregation of the Presbyterian Church Canada located at 129 Mount Pleasant Road in the Rosedale neighbourhood of Toronto, Ontario, Canada.
