= Colborne Meredith =

Canadian architect

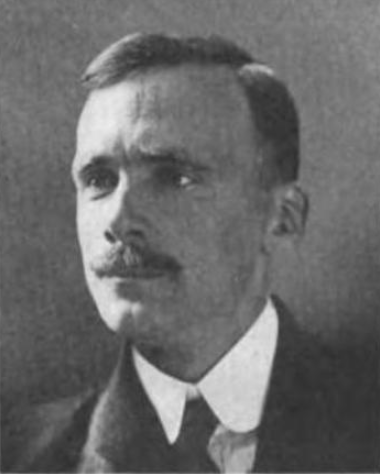
- Born: Colborne Powell Meredith; September 15, 1874; St. Andrews, New Brunswick
- Died: January 29, 1967 (aged 92); Ottawa, Ontario
- Education: University of Toronto
- Occupation: Architect
- Spouse: Alden Griffien (m. 1901)
- Father: Edmund Allen Meredith

Lt.-Colonel Colborne Powell Meredith (September 15, 1874 – January 29, 1967) was a Canadian architect.

== Biography ==
Colborne Meredith was born in St. Andrews, New Brunswick on September 15, 1874, the son of Edmund Allen Meredith, CMG. He studied architecture at the University of Toronto in the early 1890s. He married Alden Griffien in September 1901.

He was Commissioner of the Ottawa Improvement Commission (1908), President of the Ontario Architects Association (1912), and Councillor of the Royal Architectural Institute of Canada. He designed many of the principal buildings and residences in Ottawa, including the Château Laurier Hotel, as well as a number of schools and convents throughout Canada. Meredith chaired the conference of the Ontario Association of Architects in Ottawa 1911 and also chaired the 1912 Royal Architectural Institute of Canada convention in Ottawa.

Meredith joined the Militia in 1892, and from 1915 to 1918 was camp engineer and later camp commandant of Camp Petawawa. From 1925 to 1934 he served as General-Secretary to the League of Nations Society in Canada.

He died at his home in Ottawa on January 29, 1967.

== Architectural works ==
- Rockcliffe Park, Residence For Miss Annie Mcleod-Clark, Lisgar Road, 1908
- Wurtemberg Street, Residence For F.C. Trench O'hara, 1908
- Wilbrod Street, At Augusta Street, Residence For John S. Ewart, 1908
- Belleville, Ont., St. Michael's Roman Catholic Separate School, Church Street, 1908
- Pembroke, Ont., Rectory For Holy Trinity Anglican Church, 1909
- Pembroke, Ont., Munro Block, Pembroke Street West Near Albert Street, C. 1910
- Pembroke, Ont., Dunlop & Co. Warehouse, Pembroke Street West Near Moffat Street, C. 1910
- Laurier Avenue West, Near Elgin Street, Residence For Dr. John Robertson, 1909–10
- The Driveway, At Delaware Avenue, Residence For Joseph A. Thibodeau, 1909–10
- Fotheringham & Popham Co., Queen Street, Warehouse, 1909–10
- Carling Building, For The Murphy-Gamble Department Store, Sparks Street, 1909–10)
- Clemow Avenue, Residence For George A. Crain, 1910
- Blackburn & Bryson, Bank Street Near Sparks Street, 1910
- Salisbury Avenue, Residence For Hon. Sidney Fisher, 1910
- Goulburn Avenue, Residence For Justice Lyman P. Duff, 1910–11
- Queen Street, Warehouse For The Dominion Analyst, 1910)
- Renfrew, Ont., Roman Catholic Separate School, And Addition To Roman Catholic Convent, 1911
- Morewood, Ont., Continuation School, 1911
- Hugh M. Carson Co., Sparks Street Near Lyon Street, Addition, 1911
- Carling Avenue, Residence For Ernest M. Barrett, 1911
- Marlborough Avenue, Residence For T. D'arcy Mcgee, 1911
- Range Road, Residence For The Architect, 1911
- Quebec City, Que., Residence For Georges A. Parent, Grand Allee, 1912
- Parish Hall, For The Roman Catholic Episcopal Corp., 1912
- Marlborough Avenue, Residence For Thomas A. Beament, 1912
- Laurier Avenue East, Residence For Dr. Frederick W.C. Mohr, 1913
- York Street, Warehouse For S.J. Major & Co., 1913
- Carling Building, Bank Street, For F.W. Carling, 1913
- Albert Street, Business Block For Mrs. Cowie, 1913
- University Of Ottawa, Laurier Avenue At Cumberland Street, Additions, 1914
- Ottawa Canoe Club, A Clubhouse On The Ottawa River At Rockcliffe, 1914
- Norlite Building, Wellington Street, C. 1916 (With Richards & Abra)
- Range Road, Residence For The Architect, C. 1920
- Meredith & Belfrey
- Lambton Avenue, Residence For Charles B. Topp, C. 1921
- Lambton Avenue, Residence For A. Gladstone Ghent, C. 1921
- Rideau Terrace, Residence For William D. Headley, C. 1921
- Rockcliffe Way, Residence For Joseph Stotesbury, C. 1921
- Rockcliffe Way, Residence For Archibald N. Fraser, C. 1921
