= William Campbell (judge) =

Canadian politician

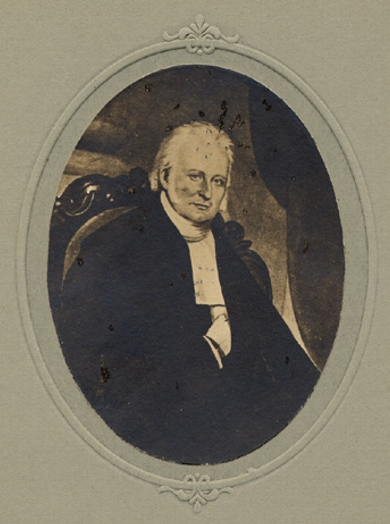
Sir William Campbell

Sir William Campbell (2 August 1758 – 18 January 1834) was Chief Justice of the King's Bench of Upper Canada and a resident of York, Upper Canada. He also held political appointments in both Nova Scotia and Upper Canada.

He was born in Caithness, Scotland in 1758. At the beginning of the American Revolution, he joined the 76th Regiment of Foot (MacDonald's Highlanders), went to North America and was taken prisoner at Yorktown, Virginia in 1781. In 1784, he settled at Guysborough, Nova Scotia. He studied law with his neighbour, Thomas Cutler, and began practicing as an attorney in 1785. A few years later, he was appointed justice of the peace and captain in the local militia. He was elected to the 8th General Assembly representing Sydney County in 1799, but did not take his seat until 18 June 1801, and his seat was declared vacant 17 Jan. 1806, apparently due to the press of his other duties. Also in 1799, he was appointed attorney general, superintendent of coal mines and a member of the Executive Council in Cape Breton. In 1801, he took on a seven-year lease to operate the coal mines but, due to his inexperience, ownership was taken back by the Crown in 1804. In 1808, after a dispute with administrator Brigadier-General Nicholas Nepean, he was dismissed from his appointments and forced to go to London to seek compensation.

In 1811, Campbell was appointed to the Court of King's Bench in Upper Canada and arrived in York (now Toronto) later that year. In 1814, he assisted Chief Justice Thomas Scott by presiding over several of a series of trials known as the "Bloody Assize", which were held at Ancaster to prosecute those charged with treason during the War of 1812. In 1825, he succeeded William Dummer Powell as Chief Justice and became a member of the Executive Council and speaker for the Legislative Council. He retired in 1829 due to failing health; he was knighted in April 1829.

In 1822, he built the Campbell House on Duke Street at the head of Frederick Street. This house was later acquired by the Advocates Society of Ontario and moved to the north-west corner of Queen Street and University Avenue on 31 March 1972.

Building	Year Completed	Builder	Style	Source	Location	Image
Campbell House	1822	William Campbell	Georgian architecture	W	University Avenue and Queen Street West (moved from Adelaide Street in 1972)	

In the early autumn of 1822, a group of Masons met at Campbell House to plan the formation of the new Freemason's Lodge on which the United Grand Lodge of England had conferred the name and style of St. Andrew's Lodge #1 on the Register of the Provincial Grand Lodge of Upper Canada and #754 on the English Register with Campbell as its first Master. This Lodge was later renumbered #16 on the register of the new Grand Lodge of Canada.

Campbell died in Toronto in 1834.

Legal offices
Preceded by William Dummer Powell; 1816–1825	Chief Justice of Upper Canada; 1825–1829	Succeeded by John Beverley Robinson, 1st Baronet
