= L Tower =

Residential skyscraper in Toronto, Ontario, Canada

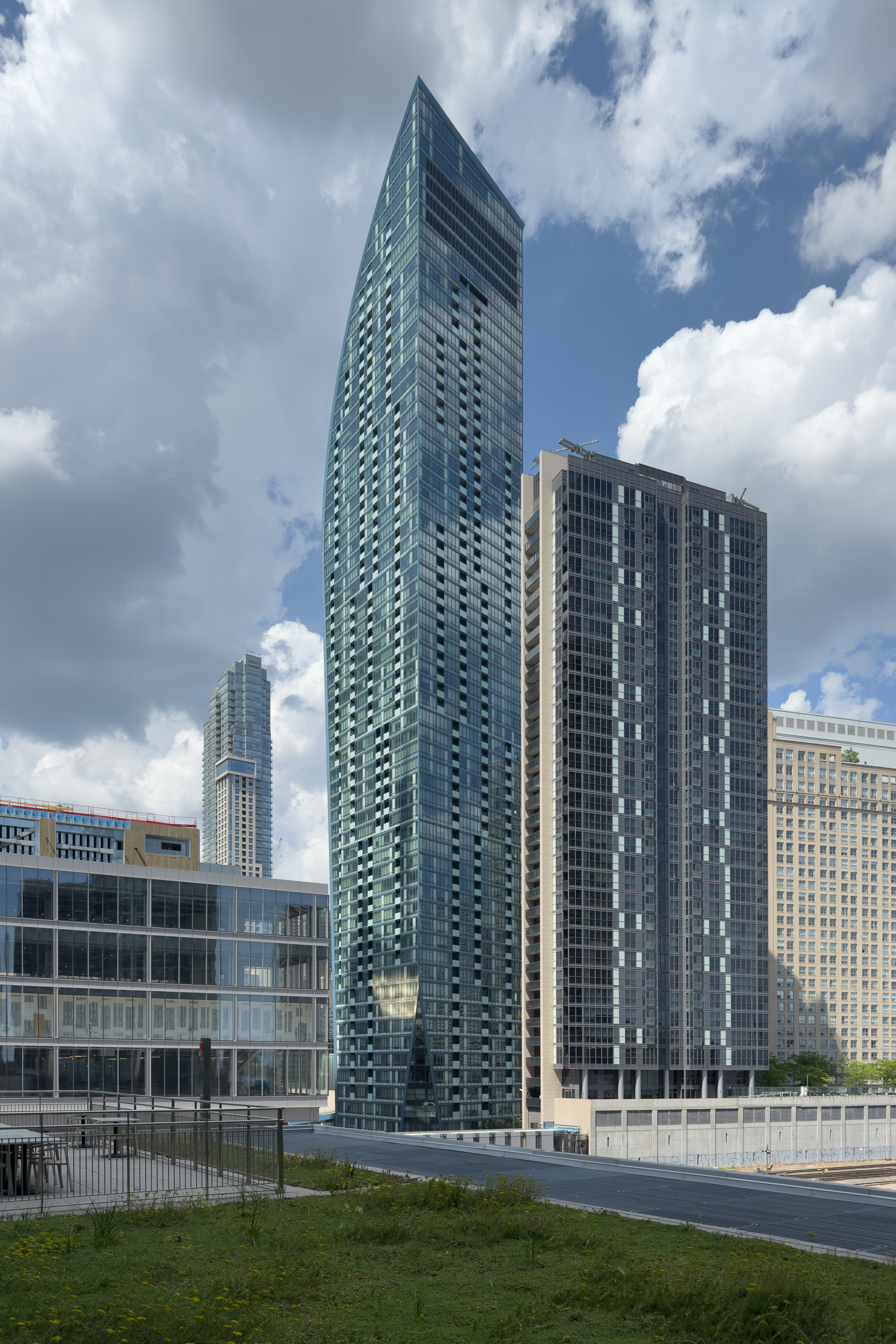

General information
- Status: Completed
- Type: Residential
- Location: 8 The Esplanade; Toronto, Ontario, Canada
- Coordinates: 43°38′47″N 79°22′35″W
- Completed: 2016
- Cost: CAD $235 million

Height
- Roof: 205 metres (673 ft)

Technical details
- Floor count: 58

Design and construction
- Architect: Daniel Libeskind
- Developer: Castlepoint Realty Partners Ltd.
- Engineer: Smith and Anderson (MEP)
- Structural engineer: Jablonsky, Ast and Partners

The L Tower (also known as the Libeskind Tower) is a residential skyscraper in Toronto, Ontario, Canada, which was designed by architect Daniel Libeskind. The project, which broke ground in mid-October 2009, saw many delays. One cause for delay was a stop-work order caused by safety concerns about the crane at the top of the building. The crane was also considered an eyesore by many residents. Despite the cranes (which were removed by May 2016 and September 2018 respectively), the building still won the eighth place Emporis Skyscraper Award in 2017.

In the 2000s, the Sony Centre for the Performing Arts (then known as the Hummingbird Centre) was expected to be demolished and the land sold. However, Hummingbird Centre CEO Dan Brambilla convinced the city to preserve the site and approve the condo development.

== Developers ==
The building is being developed by three builders: Cityzen and Castlepoint Numa of Toronto, and Fernbrook Homes of Concord, Ontario.

== Sony Plaza and public art ==
The Sony Plaza is an open space elevated above the intersection of Yonge and Front streets. It is being designed by Claude Cormier and Associates.

Canadian artist Harley Valentine is creating a triptych of sculptures to be installed in the Sony Plaza. Called Dream Ballet in hommage to the National Ballet of Canada's four-decade residence at the site, the three sculptures depict abstracted ballet dancers in various dynamic positions.

== Award ==
In 2017, the L Tower was awarded an Emporis Skyscraper Award in the number 8 spot, in the category of best new skyscraper.

== Controversies ==
In June 2015, Ontario's Ministry of Labour began investigating the L Tower's work site due to complaints about its partially assembled crane. A stop-work order was issued, and engineering reports were ordered to confirm the crane was structurally sound before continuing work; due at the end of July, these reports were not provided. The crane's operator resigned after he felt his concerns that the crane could collapse were being ignored by the construction manager, and the business manager of IUOE Local 793 stated: "We don’t believe we should be rolling the dice on a custom-made lifting device over the heads of the good people of Toronto."

In February 2018, former members of a number of condominium boards—including L Tower—were accused of misusing funds, resulting in litigation. Two members of the L Tower's condominium board resigned as a result.

In July 2021, the crane atop the condo tower collapsed. The crane, a building maintenance unit, with its purpose for window cleaning toppled when its 20,000 lb. counterweight fell. The windows of the L Tower have not been washed ever since, as reported by its residents. Reports said the crash had left significant damage to the Meridian Hall Arts Centre adjacent to the condominium, which was later found to be incorrect.

== See also ==
- List of tallest buildings in Toronto
- List of tallest buildings in Canada
- Sony Centre for the Performing Arts
