= George Stephen Benjamin Jarvis =

Canadian judge and politician

George Stephen Benjamin Jarvis (April 21, 1797 – April 15, 1878) was a judge and political figure in Upper Canada.

He was born in Fredericton, New Brunswick in 1797 and moved to York (Toronto) with his family in 1809. He joined the 49th Regiment of the British Army as a volunteer and served during the War of 1812. He served in the 104th Regiment until 1817. He then studied law with Jonas Jones in Brockville and was called to the bar in 1823. In 1825, he was appointed judge in the Ottawa District court. In 1836, he was elected to the Legislative Assembly of Upper Canada for Cornwall. In 1837, he was appointed judge in the Johnstown District. During the Rebellions of 1837, he raised and commanded a cavalry unit in the Stormont County militia, the Cornwall Lancers. In 1842, he was appointed judge in the Eastern District and continued to serve as judge for the United Counties of Stormont, Dundas and Glengarry when the county system was introduced in 1849.

He died in Cornwall in 1878. His brother William Botsford Jarvis also served in the Assembly.
