= Meridian Hall (Toronto) =

Performing arts venue in Toronto, Ontario

- "The barn that beer built"
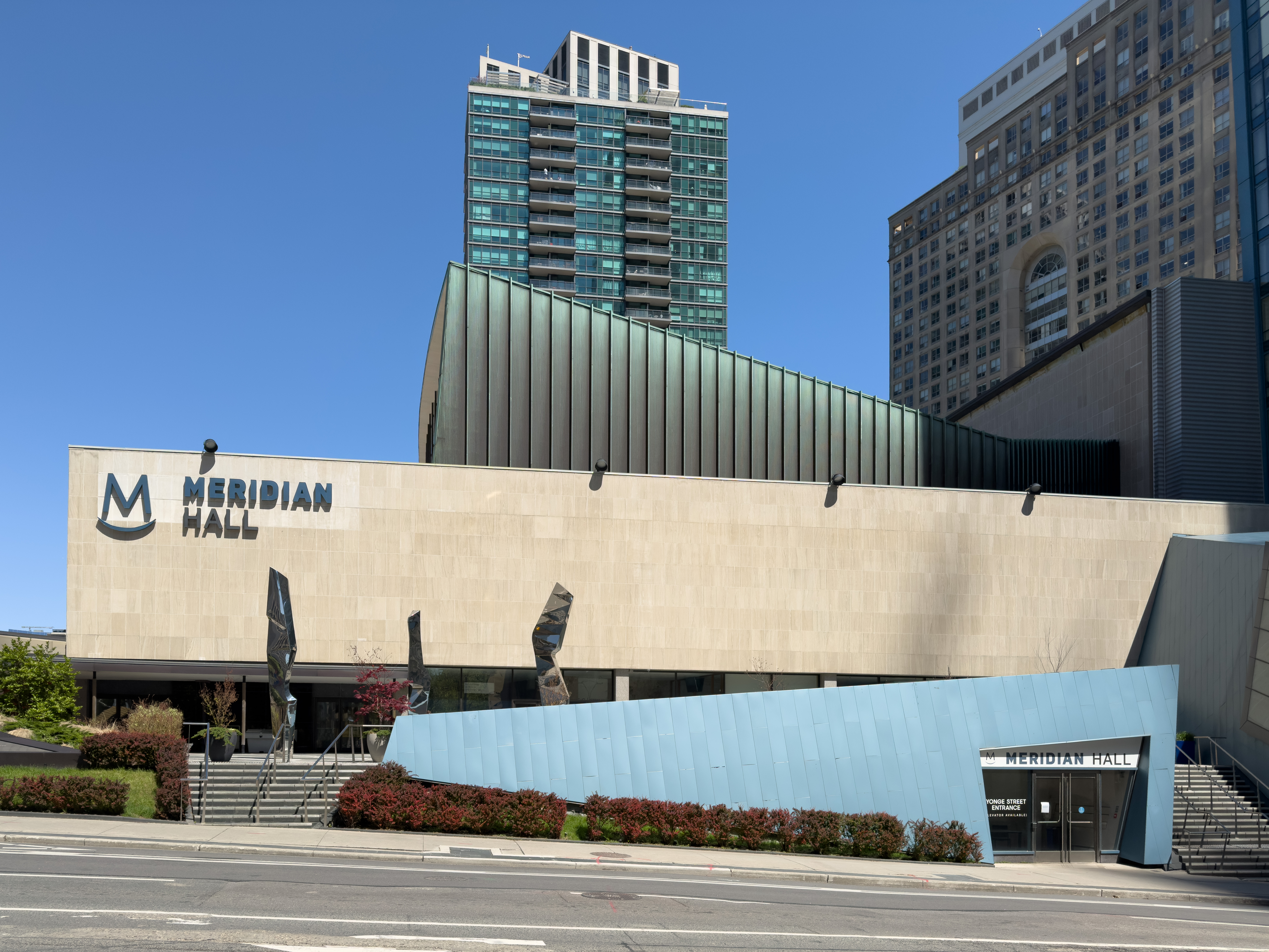
- Exterior view from Front and Yonge Street
- Interactive map of Meridian Hall
- Former names: O'Keefe Centre for the Performing Arts (1960–1996); Hummingbird Centre for the Performing Arts (1996–2007); Sony Centre for the Performing Arts (2007–2019)
- Address: 1 Front Street East; Toronto, Ontario; M5E 1B2
- Coordinates: 43.6466°N 79.3761°W
- Owner: City of Toronto government
- Capacity: 3,191
- Type: Performing arts venue
- Public transit: King TTC streetcars Union Station: Lakeshore West; Lakeshore East; Milton; Kitchener; Barrie; Richmond Hill; Stouffville; Union Pearson Express; Canadian; Corridor; Maple Leaf; GO Transit bus services

Construction
- Opened: October 1, 1960
- Reopened: October 1, 2010
- Rebuilt: 2008–2010
- Years active: 1960–2008; 2010–present
- Cost: CA$12 million
- Architects: Earle C. Morgan; Peter Dickinson

Website
- tolive.com/Home-Page

Meridian Hall, originally opened as O'Keefe Centre for the Performing Arts on October 1, 1960, is a performing arts venue in Toronto, Ontario, also known as Hummingbird Centre for the Performing Arts (1996–2007), and as the Sony Centre for the Performing Arts (2007–2019). It was re-branded as Meridian Hall on September 15, 2019. Located at 1 Front Street East, the facility was constructed for the City of Toronto municipal government, paid for by the O'Keefe Brewery, and houses the largest soft-seat theatre in Canada. It is currently managed by TO Live, an arm's-length agency and registered charity created by the city.

Over its history, the Centre, due to its size and acoustics, has catered primarily to large-scale spectacles, being the home of the Canadian Opera Company and the National Ballet of Canada until 2006. It has hosted touring productions of the Kirov Ballet and the Metropolitan Opera, numerous Broadway musicals, music concerts and legitimate theatre.

In 2008, the City of Toronto designated the theatre a heritage building. That year, it also underwent renovations to restore features such as the marquee canopy and York Wilson's lobby mural, The Seven Lively Arts. Restoration of the wood, brass and marble was undertaken, along with audience seating, flooring upgrades, new washrooms and reconfigured lobby spaces. Following two years of renovations and restoration work, the building reopened on October 1, 2010, fifty years to the date of the first opening night performance.

== History ==
The Centre was built on land formerly occupied by a series of commercial buildings, including the Canadian Consolidated Rubber Company, and previously it was the site of the Great Western Railway Terminal (later the Toronto Wholesale Fruit Market). The site was purchased by the City of Toronto. The site, being on the south side of Front Street, was originally a water lot of Toronto Harbour prior to infilling for railways and warehouses. During construction, wooden piles from old wharves were removed, and the basement floor built in a waterproof trench.

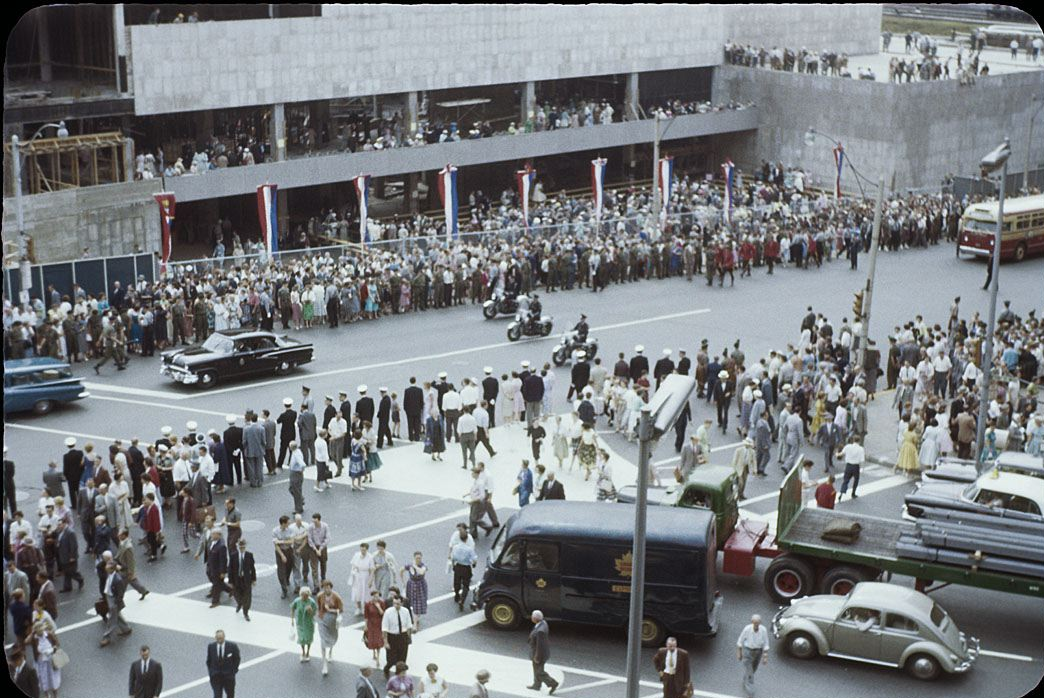
Motorcade for Queen Elizabeth II passes the performing arts venue still under construction in 1959

The idea for a performing arts centre that could serve the needs of an increasingly dynamic city predates the building's opening by almost 20 years. In the mid-1940s, Nathan Phillips issued a challenge to Toronto industrialists to underwrite the cost of a multipurpose centre for theatre, music and dance. Response to Phillips' challenge was not immediate. E. P. Taylor, the racehorse-loving head of Canadian Breweries, which owned O'Keefe Brewing, offered in early 1955 to build a performing arts centre that would not only serve the needs of local institutions but increase the diversity of entertainment options available in Toronto. Toronto City Council immediately accepted the proposal in principle, but not until 1958 was the project finally approved to be built. Among others, United Church spokesmen opposed the idea that money from the sale of beer would be used for community development. Taylor assigned one of his key executives, Hugh Walker, to oversee building what was to be known, during its first 36 years, as the O'Keefe Centre. The Centre became known affectionately as "the barn that beer built."

The original concept was to build a multi-building complex like the Rockefeller Center in New York City with buildings on both sides of Front Street. An office building on the north side of Front Street would defray the cost of the auditorium. The complex was reduced to fit the allotted budget. Other features dropped were a small theatre for legitimate theatre and exhibition space. Ultimately, it was decided that the Centre would have one multi-purpose auditorium. Clearing of the site began in 1957 and construction of the building began in 1958 with a goal to finish in the fall of 1959. Construction was delayed due to a general strike and postponed to the fall of 1960 to coincide with theatre season.

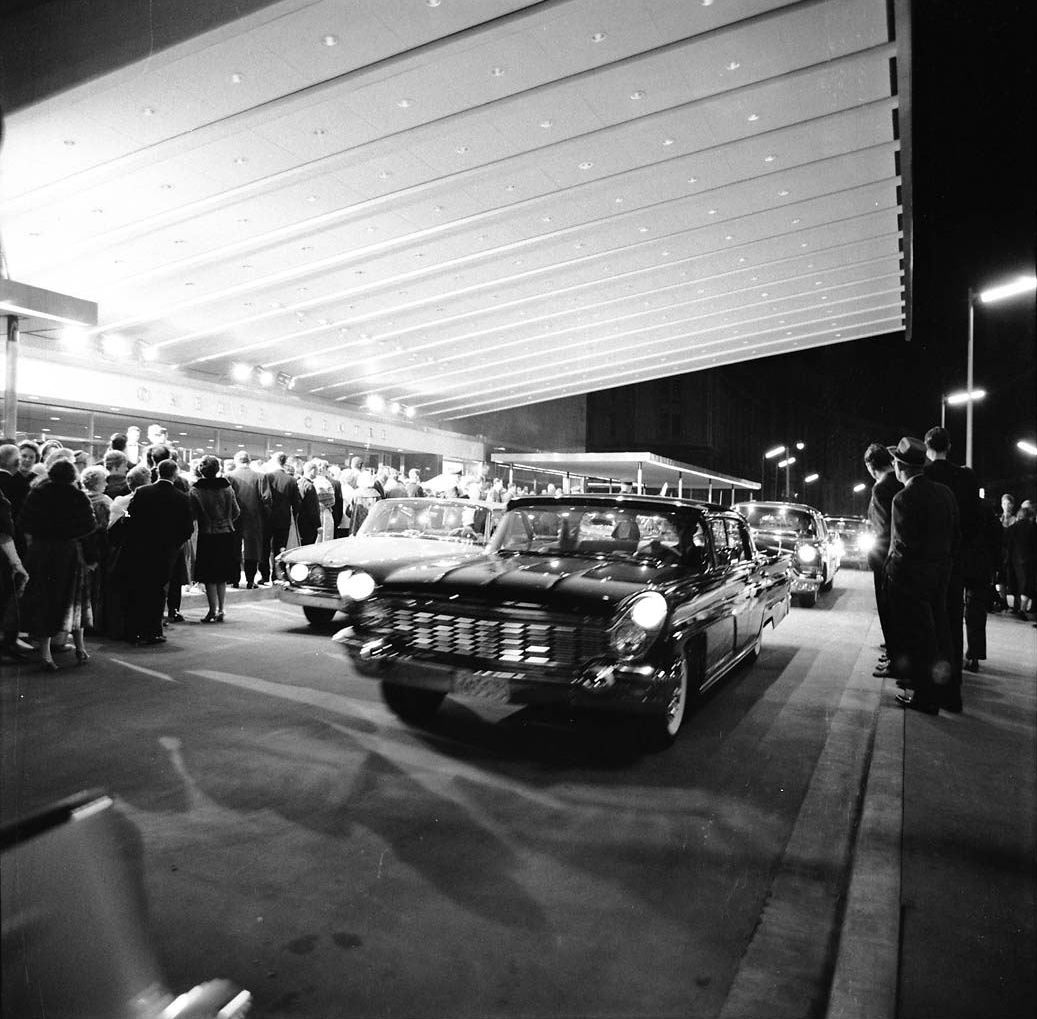
Opening night of the O'Keefe Centre in October 1960

The O'Keefe Centre opened on October 1, 1960, with a red-carpet gala. The first production was Alexander H. Cohen's production of the pre-Broadway premiere of Lerner and Loewe's Camelot, starring Richard Burton, Julie Andrews and Robert Goulet. Laurence Olivier brought his production of Becket in April 1961.

The first season was concluded by performances by New York's Metropolitan Opera ("The Met") for productions of von Flotow's Martha starring Victoria de los Ángeles and Puccini's Turandot starring Birgit Nilsson in May 1961. The Met would return in future seasons with such well-known performers as Plácido Domingo and Renata Scotto. The first season saw the O'Keefe set six box-office world records for its subscription series of productions.

Beginning in 1961, the Canadian Opera Association (later the Canadian Opera Company or COC) made the Centre its home stage. Its first season of performances ran from September to October, with productions of Bizet's Carmen, Puccini's Tosca, Mascagnis' Cavalleria rusticana, Leoncavallo's Pagliacci, and Smetana's The Bartered Bride.

In 1964, the National Ballet of Canada moved to the O'Keefe from the smaller Royal Alexandra Theatre (Royal Alex). During its 42-year residency at the O'Keefe, Canadians Karen Kain, Veronica Tennant and Rex Harrington of the National Ballet become stars.

In 1968, the O'Keefe was purchased for CA$2.7 million by the Metro Toronto government. This relieved the then-City of Toronto government of its upkeep. Amalgamation in 1998 transferred it from Metro to the new City of Toronto.

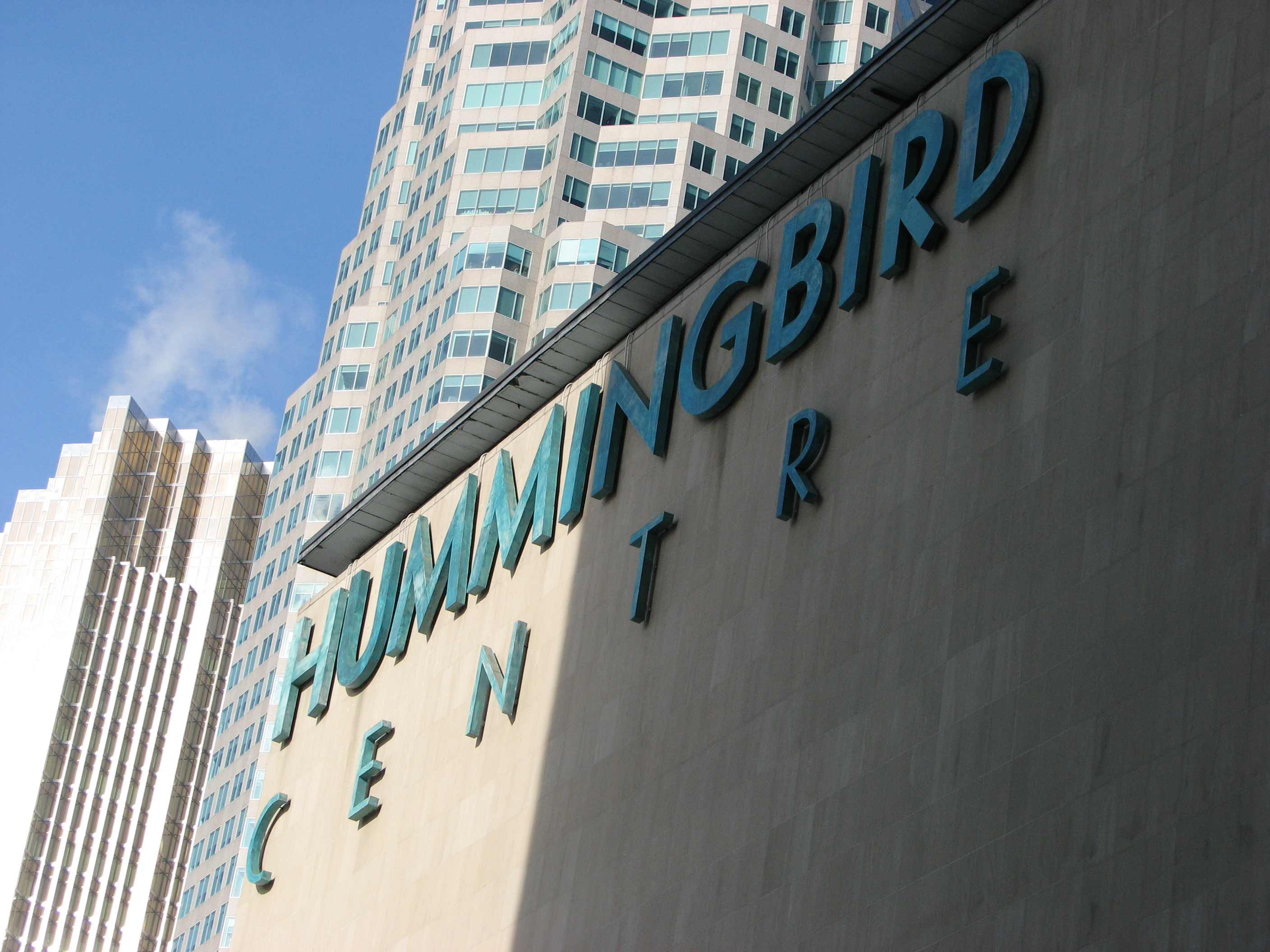
Signage for the performing arts venue in 2007. From 1996 to 2007, the venue was known as the Hummingbird Centre.

In 1974, the Bolshoi Ballet performed at the O'Keefe. During the visit a young Mikhail Baryshnikov defected from the Soviet Union by escaping through a back stage door into a waiting getaway car, aided by journalist John Fraser, federal civil servant Jim Peterson and businessman Tim Stewart.

In 1976, Tom Burrows succeeded Hugh Walker as general manager. Burrows had previously managed the Shaw Festival. Burrows promised to open up the O'Keefe to local groups. Pre-Broadway productions of shows would no longer appear at the O'Keefe due to rising costs of production and touring. After consecutive large deficits at the O'Keefe, threatening its future, Burrows was replaced in 1978 by John Kruger, a Metro Toronto civil servant, who reduced its deficit to near-zero by 1980.

In 1988, the O'Keefe was closed in December due to a strike by the stagehands union. Performances by the National Ballet were cancelled, and productions by the Canadian Opera Company were put into jeopardy until a settlement was reached in January 1989.

In early February 1996, the facility was renamed the Hummingbird Centre in recognition of a major gift from a Canadian software company, Hummingbird Communications Ltd. The CA$5 million donation allowed the Centre to undertake a number of capital improvements and repairs, including the installation of an elevator and an acoustic reinforcement system for the auditorium. In October 2006, OpenText acquired Hummingbird and declined to renew its contract with the centre. In September 2007, Sony bought the naming rights to the Centre for CA$10 million, and a ten-year partnership was born.

The O'Keefe Centre was designed as a multi-purpose arts centre, taking in account the needs of several different performing arts, but most suitable for musical spectacle. It has been compared to London's Royal Festival Hall and the Theatre Royal, Drury Lane. However, neither the National Ballet or the Canadian Opera Company found the centre to be ideal, although it was an improvement over their previous venues. The acoustics were not ideal for their needs and the O'Keefe lacked storage space. Sets and equipment had to be stored off-site. A plan for a new opera and ballet hall was planned for many years and finally was built as the smaller (2,000 seat), purpose-designed Four Seasons Centre. In 2006, the two companies moved to the Four Seasons Centre, used exclusively by the two companies. Anticipating the need for other programming, the Centre adopted a more broad programming approach, starting in 2004, to fit with the multicultural nature of Toronto.

In 2006, the performing arts venue received approval from the City of Toronto for the development of a high-rise condominium building beside the Centre. Designed by architect Daniel Libeskind (who also designed the Crystal addition to the Royal Ontario Museum), the L Tower was built on the southwest corner of the property. The Sony Centre closed on June 26, 2008, to begin the theatre renovations, which were unveiled on October 1, 2010.

On January 21, 2019, the City of Toronto announced a CA$30.75 million fifteen-year partnership with Meridian Credit Union, re-branding the Sony Centre into Meridian Hall, and the Toronto Centre for the Arts into the Meridian Arts Centre. The arts venues formally adopted their new names on September 15, 2019.

== Notable concerts and productions ==
Over its lifespan, the Centre has hosted many concerts. Judy Garland performed two concerts in December 1961, with an estimated demand of 20,000 people vying for the 6,400 seats. She appeared again in 1965 for six performances. Harry Belafonte appeared at the O'Keefe twelve times from November 1960 to February 1990. Tom Jones appeared five times at the O'Keefe from June 1974 to July 1987.

Other popular music artists include Duke Ellington (May 1966), Louis Armstrong (June 1966), Diana Ross & The Supremes (April 1969), Bob Dylan, Janet Jackson, Elton John, Steve Earle, Leonard Cohen, Charles Aznavour (November 1971), Liza Minnelli (November 1971, September 1978), David Bowie (June 1974), Elvis Costello (November 1978), Anne Murray (August 1980), Lou Reed (June 2000), Morrissey (October 2004), and Dionne Warwick (October 2004).

Bands that have appeared include The Grateful Dead, who played eight shows with the Jefferson Airplane over a period of six days in July/August 1967, The Who, Led Zeppelin (November 1969), Radiohead (June 2006), The Carpenters, The Clash (September 1979), R.E.M. (November 2004), and the Beastie Boys (September 2007).

Other artists who have performed on the arts venue's stage in a range of solo shows, revues and jazz spectaculars include Marlene Dietrich, Ethel Merman in Annie Get Your Gun (1966), Danny Kaye (1968), Sammy Davis Jr. (1968), Ray Bolger (1969), Debbie Reynolds (1970), Bill Cosby, Jack Benny, Don Rickles (August 1980) and Liberace (1982).

In April 1963, "The Ed Sullivan Show" was produced live at the O'Keefe. The show was headlined by Wayne and Shuster with Xavier Cugat, Abbe Lane, Connie Francis and Jack Carter.

In 1963, John Gielgud brought his production of The School for Scandal to the O'Keefe. It starred Gielgud as Charles Surface, Ralph Richardson, his wife Muriel Forbes, Gwen Ffrangcon-Davies, Richard Easton, and Laurence Naismith. In February 1964, Richard Burton returned to star in Hamlet accompanied by Elizabeth Taylor. Other stage productions have included Hello, Dolly! in April 1965 with Mary Martin, returning with Carol Channing and Pearl Bailey in later productions. In November 1966, Fiddler on the Roof made the first of eight visits. In March 1971, Katharine Hepburn broke box-office records starring as Coco Chanel in the musical Coco.

In October 1972, the National Ballet premiered Rudolf Nureyev's lavish and expensive production of The Sleeping Beauty. Each year in December, it would put on The Nutcracker as a Christmas tradition. The venue has also seen frequent visits by the Royal Winnipeg Ballet and Les Grands Ballets Canadiens. The venue has also welcomed a wide range of international dance companies such as Les Ballets Africains, Britain's Royal Ballet, New York City Ballet, Dance Theatre of Harlem, the Dutch National Ballet, the Cuban National Ballet, Alvin Ailey American Dance Theater, Ballet Folklórico de México, as well as the Kirov and Bolshoi Ballet companies from the then-Soviet Union.

In 1984, Toronto hosted the Toronto International Festival celebrating the city's 150th anniversary. The O'Keefe was selected for several productions with The Met producing Peter Grimes with Jon Vickers, Francesca da Rimini, Ernani with Leona Mitchell, Die Walküre and The Abduction. The National Ballet performed Onegin, and the COC performed Death in Venice.

The 2000s saw an increase in multicultural productions. Notable performances that reflect the multicultural mandate include The Last Empress (a Korean historical musical) (2004), the Virsky Ukrainian Dance Company (2004), South Africa's Soweto Gospel Choir (2014), The Shaolin Warriors (2002), and David Rudder & Friends (2004).

In June 2012, the Sony Centre hosted the Canadian premiere of the Philip Glass and Robert Wilson opera Einstein on the Beach.

Irish pop band Westlife concert for their The Wild Dreams Tour on March 11-13, 2024.

== Architecture ==
Designed by Earle C. Morgan and Page & Steeles' Peter Dickinson, the performing arts venue is an example of a mid-twentieth century modern performing arts venue. It is four stories high and is broken up into three main forms: the entrance block, auditorium and fly tower. The central form of the building is highly symmetrical with an open floor plan. Structurally, the performing arts venue uses steel trusses and concrete to hold the majority of the building together. There are two court, on the east and west sides of the building. The exterior is clad in Alabama limestone.

The interior was designed by Herbert Irvine, inspired by the Royal Festival Hall in London, England. The seats were designed to resemble those in the Royal Festival Hall. The interior also resembles the Royal Festival Hall in other ways, with its large double-height foyer with coffered ceilings, cantilevered stairs, a mezzanine foyer, side lounges and basement lounge, an improvement not seen in Toronto theatres to that date. The fan-shaped auditorium has polished bronze doors, and a curved large single balcony, with wood panelling for acoustics. There are no obstructed views and no seat is further than 124 feet (38 m) from the stage.

The materials used were luxurious. They included glazing, granite, copper, bronze, Carrara marble, carpet, cherry plywood panels and Brazilian rosewood. The performing arts venue is very diverse in its range of materials and employs them in such a way that they are not overshadowed by the unique forms of the building.

A large effort was made to provide the hall with good acoustics. The acoustic consultants were Henderson and Kodaras. The walls of the auditorium are lined with cherry plywood over concrete block, in a waffle pattern. These are movable absorbent panels. The opening is high to the balcony to allow full sound penetration to the balcony, and the rear wall is highly absorbent so that no sound would reflect off the rear wall, as it would be slightly delayed. These efforts were made so no false images of the sound of the stage or orchestra would occur. The sharply ramped floor helped to allow high frequency sounds to reach all patrons.

Later changes came in 1996. The acoustics were improved with an acoustic amplification system, which gives the audience the sense that the sound surrounds them. At the same time, an elevator was installed. A further renovation was completed in 2010, in conjunction with the construction of the L Tower condominium building to the rear, completed in 2016.

=== The Seven Lively Arts ===
Above the entrance to the foyer is a 15 feet (4.6 m) high by 100 feet (30 m) wide mural by the Toronto-born artist York Wilson. It has seven sections: Painting, Sculpture, Architecture, Music, Literature, Dance and Drama. The Painting section highlights cave, Egyptian, Renaissance and abstract painting. The Sculpture highlights Hittite bas-relief, Venus de Milo, a sphinx, a totem pole and a contemporary steel sculpture. Architecture depicts the Parthenon, Gothic architecture, interior design and a skyscraper. Music depicts early drums, wind and string instruments, a bar of music from a well-known opera, and a scene from a Wagner opera. Literature depicts a man and woman, a sailing ship, a Chinese proverb, and abstract shapes for abstract thought. Dance portrays war and sun worship dances, an Indonesian dance and the corps de ballet of Swan Lake. Drama depicts Oedipus Rex masks, a religious parade, and a scene from Hamlet.

== See also ==
- List of music venues in Toronto
