= TO Live =

TO Live is an agency of the City of Toronto responsible for managing the city's major municipally owned theatres: Meridian Hall, Meridian Arts Centre, and the St. Lawrence Centre for the Arts. Prior to 2019, the agency was known as Civic Theatres Toronto. It was established to consolidate the operations of the three venues into a single arts organization. The agency's board consists of thirteen directors appointed by Toronto City Council. The TO Live Foundation is a registered charity set up to raise funds for artist support and programming
