= Campbell House (Toronto) =

Heritage house and museum in Ontario, Canada

Coordinates: 43°39′03.5″N 79°23′14″W

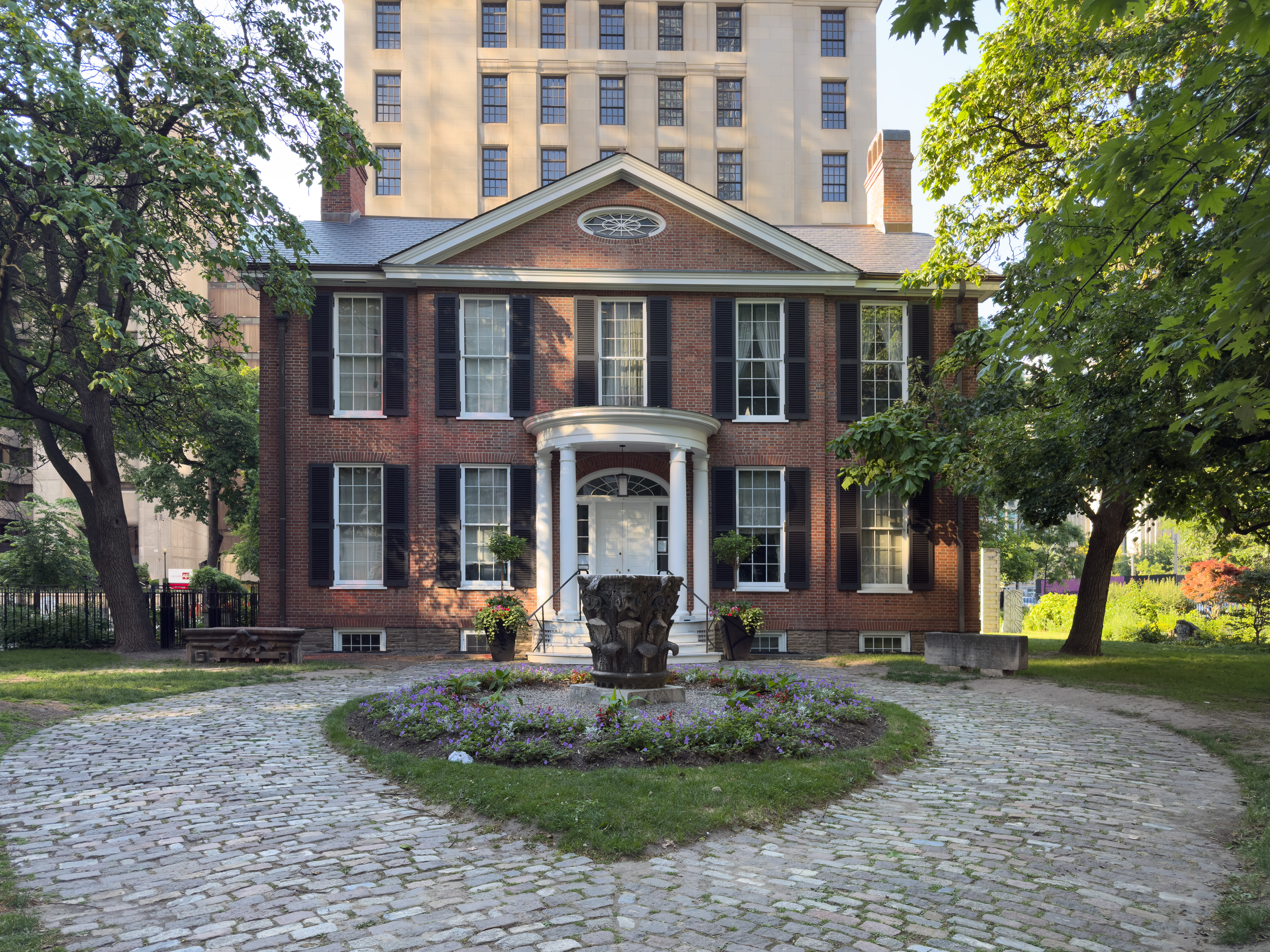
Exterior of Campbell House from the south

Campbell House is an 1822 heritage house and museum in downtown Toronto, Ontario, Canada. It was built for Upper Canada Chief Justice Sir William Campbell and his wife Hannah. The home was designed for entertaining and comfort, and constructed at a time when the Campbells were socially and economically established and their children had grown to adulthood. The house is one of the few remaining examples of Georgian architecture left in Toronto and is constructed in a style in vogue during the late Georgian era known as Palladian architecture.

== History ==
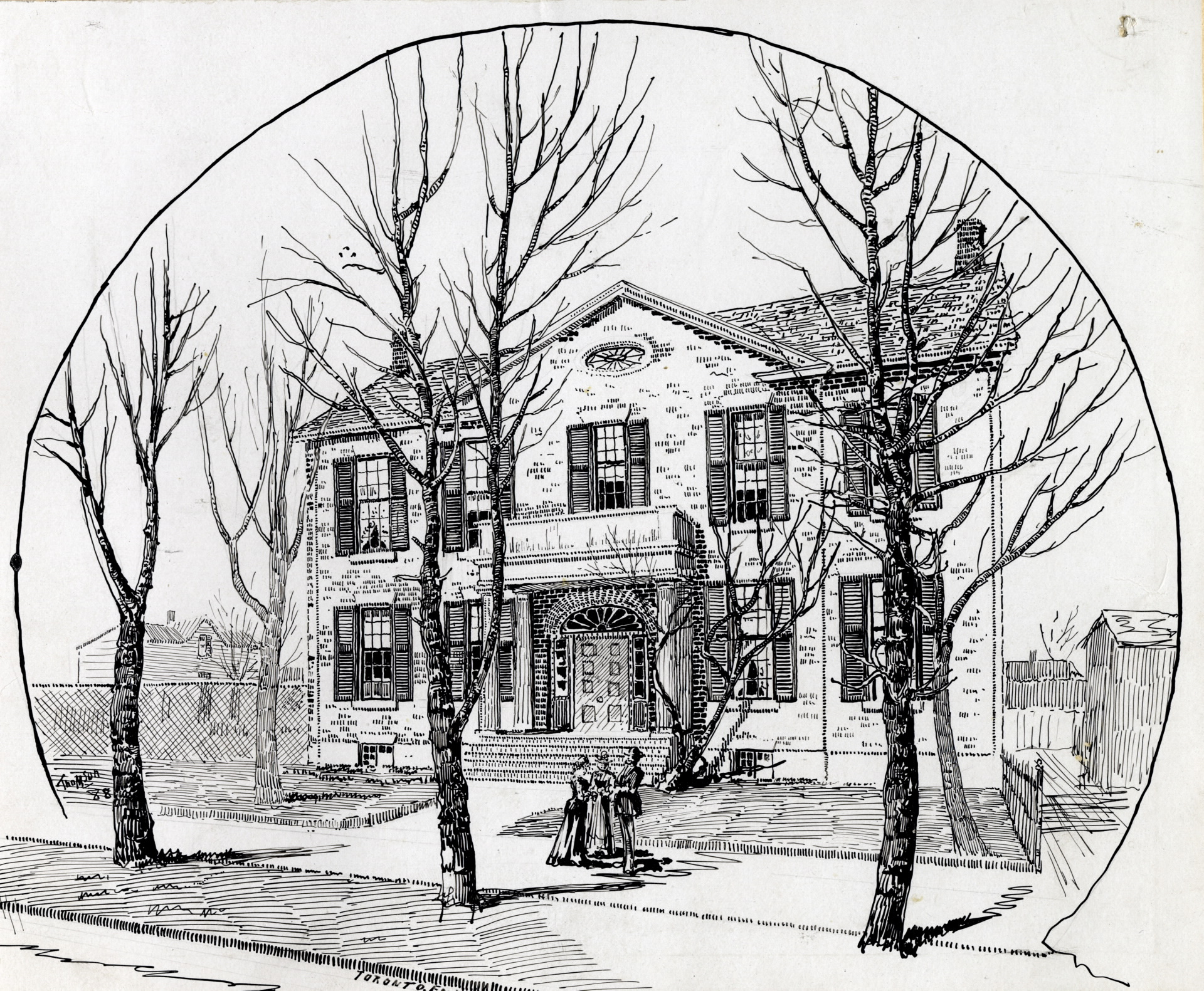
Depiction of Campbell House at its original location, on Duke Street

The house was originally located on a plot of land 1.5 km (0.93 mi) southeast of its current location, at the intersection of what is now Adelaide Street (then 64 Duke Street) and Frederick Street. More specifically, it stood at the head of Frederick Street as a view terminus, on the site presently occupied by George Brown College's Chef School or Centre for Hospitality at 300 Adelaide Street East. Upon Sir William Campbell's death in 1834, his estate conveyed the house to his wife, Lady Campbell, for her use. After Lady Campbell's death in 1844, her estate auctioned the property and the contents of the house with the proceeds distributed amongst their heirs. For most of the 19th century the structure remained a private residence. It was home to various prominent citizens (Hon. James Gordon, Terence O’Neil, John Strathy and John Fensom) until 1890, by which point the neighbourhood had changed into a commercial and industrial zone. The building eventually came to be used by several businesses after the turn of the 20th century as office space and a factory, including Hobbs Glass Company; Capewell Horse Nail Company and Masco Elevator Company.

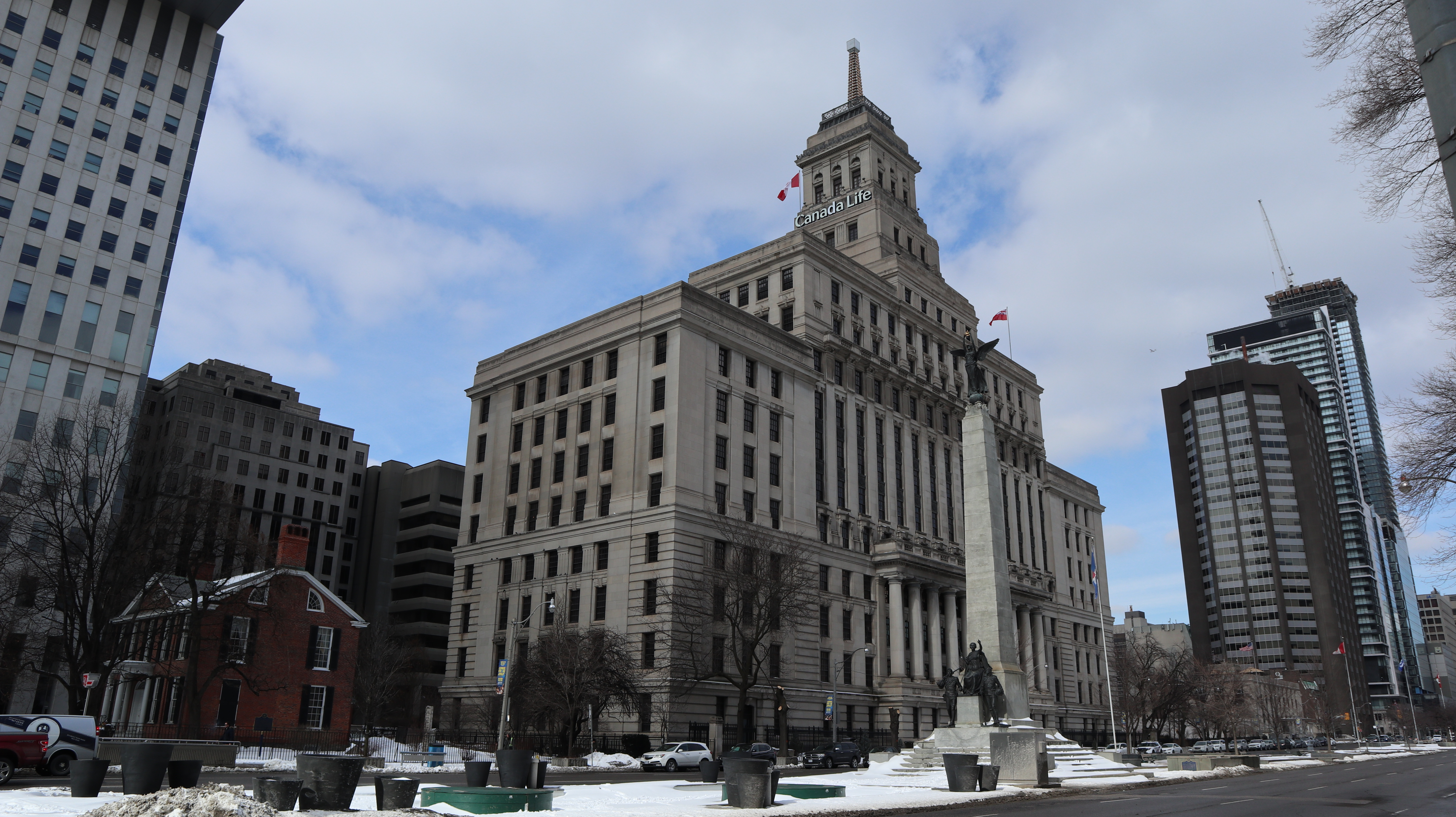
Campbell House after it was relocated to the northwest corner of University Avenue and Queen Street West

In 1972, the last owners of the property, the Coutts-Hallmark Greeting Cards Company, wanted to demolish the house to expand its parking lot. Prior to demolition the company offered the house to anyone who could remove it from the property. A professional association of trial lawyers known as the Advocates Society launched a campaign to save the building. They eventually secured the site at the northwest corner of University Avenue and Queen Street West, south of the Canada Life Building (formerly site of three buildings at the corner including United Clothing Store). With assistance from maintenance trucks of the Toronto Transit Commission, the 270 tf (300 short tons-force) home was moved 1,617 m (5,305 ft) northwest from Adelaide Street to the north side of Queen Street West, between University Avenue and Simcoe Street on March 30, 1972. The move was a major spectacle, and attracted a large crowd as it closed several downtown streets. Her Majesty Queen Elizabeth, the Queen Mother opened the fully restored structure on June 28, 1974.

The preservation of the house was an important turning point in architectural preservation in Toronto. During the 1950s and 1960s, 19th-century homes were demolished at a rapid rate; in his 1964 book Toronto, No Mean City, architect Eric Arthur predicts that by the year 2000, there may be no 19th-century buildings left in the city. The spectacle of the physical move to save Campbell House was a preservation achievement which sparked greater interest among Torontonians to save other local landmarks when they became threatened. This inspired permanent outdoor exhibit, Lost and Found, which was installed in the Campbell House gardens in 2018.

The home is owned by the City of Toronto government and operated by the Sir William Campbell Foundation. It is a historic house museum and a former club for the members of the Advocates Society. The home has also displayed numerous exhibitions, including the 2013 show by Canadian contemporary artist Harley Valentine, titled Barbarians at the Gate.

== See also ==
- List of oldest buildings and structures in Toronto
- List of museums in Toronto
