= Harley Valentine =

Canadian contemporary artist

- Born: Darryl Wilson; November 4, 1983 (age 42); Grimsby, Ontario, Canada
- Known for: sculptor, photographer

Harley Valentine (born November 4, 1983) is a contemporary Canadian artist based in Toronto, Ontario. Valentine is best known for his metal-plate biomorphic sculptures that build on the formalism of mid-century American sculptors, such as Alexander Calder, and John McCraken. His sculptures have been internationally recognized. and commissioned by the federal government of Canada. He is currently completing a major sculpture commission The Dream Ballet, for the Sony Centre for the Performing Arts Plaza, in front of Daniel Libeskind’s L Tower residence building in Toronto, Ontario.

Important sculpture works include:

- Persephone
- Blue Bird
- The Dove
- Dream Ballet

In 2014, alongside architect David Binder, Valentine unveiled "The 30 Carabob Quartet", which was the first outdoor sculpture park in Scarborough, Toronto, Ontario. The four sculptures of the series came from Valentine's first large scale sculpture series The Barbarians. That series was first exhibited at The Campbell House museum in 2013.

Aside from sculpture, he sparked his early career with photographic collages of iconic urban topographies, such as Parisian landmarks and American Architecture.

== Style ==
Valentine often invites the role of performance, film and photography in the creation and presentation of his works, as seen in his 2014 short video project, "The Dance of The Dove", featuring a stop motion collage of a Canadian ballerina dancing around Valentine "Dove" sculpture.

Valentine employs 3D modelling and printing in the creation of his monumental works. He uses the Makerbot z18 to make these 3D printed maquettes, which Valenitne has said he considers as artworks themselves, staging the prototype prints next to full scale works in exhibition. This style of working from model to monument is profiled in the video From Model to Monument.

His sculptures and photo-sculptural works focus on the theme of collapse and the rebirth of civilizations, while questioning the constructs of a glorious, unattainable past.

== Inspiration ==
In a national newspaper interview profiling Valentine when he was named among Canada's "Worthy 30", the artist said he takes his inspiration every morning from a Picasso lithograph, his most prized possession. "It’s my golden chalice. I drink from its creativity every morning." He has said that two seminal ancient sculptures, The Diskobolus of Myron and Lacoön and His Son, serve as his ongoing "spiritual navigators." Canadian painter, and co-Toronto citizen, Charles Pachter also inspired and influenced Valentine's work.

== Selected works ==
=== Parisian Mirrored Gateways ===
Gateways is an experimental series of digital photo-sculptural work, deconstructing iconic Paris landscapes on large-scale mirrors. The project dealt with the illusions of a Parisian promised land, every artist's and hopeless romantic's fairytale of a creative Elysium. By re-arranging, inverting, and folding in upon themselves iconic Paris landmarks, such as the Champs-Élysées and Pont Neuf, the city and its myth are dissected into its molecular building blocks. Printed on door-sized mirrors using an experimental process, Valentine challenges the viewer to reflect on their own complicity, and desires, in creating the Paris myth.

=== Sony Center/ L-Tower ===
In 2013, Valentine completed production of his first major public art installation, The Dream Ballet, which is to be unveiled at the Claude Cormier-designed Sony Centre Plaza, in front of Daniel Liebeskind's L-Tower residence. For Valentine, being awarded this commission was "nothing if not a career-defining project for an artist not yet out of his 20s."

The project consists of a triptych designed in homage to the National Ballet of Canada's four-decade residence at the site; the three sculptures depict abstracted ballet dancers in various dynamic positions

=== The North Pole ===
In February 2013, Valentine unveiled his controversial sculpture The North Pole, which plays on themes of aboriginal art and global warming, at the De Luca Fine Arts gallery. For it, Valentine cast in bronze a seven-foot, 100-year-old narwhal tusk. Drawing on a desire to bring attention to the receding arctic ice floes, as well as the controversial decision to re-appropriate a symbol generally reserved for Aboriginal artists, he insisted he " wanted to emphasize that the tusk is a miracle of creation in its own right, not just the source of a luxurious material for doing other things"

=== Riflessi Monument ===
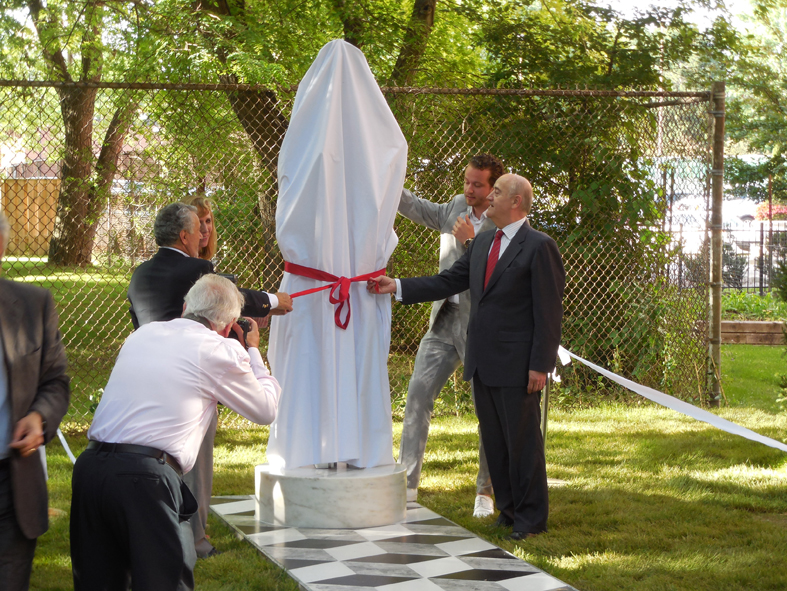
Unveiling of Riflessi Monument

Valentine's Riflessi: Italian Canadian Internment Memorial, was unveiled on Wednesday, June 26, 2013 at the Columbus Centre. The reflective, metal plated monument, standing atop a checkered marble platform, "explores the struggles and successes of the Italian Canadian immigrant story and the Italian Canadian internment history."

Funded by the government of Canada, the event was attended by Hon. Julian Fantino, Minister of International Cooperation, and former Canadian Senator Hon. Consiglio Di Nino, as well as families of interned Italian-Canadians. The Canadian minister said Valentine's work helped "us all recognize the experiences of the Italian-Canadian community and ensure that the stories are not lost. This is the reason why today’s unveiling […] is such an important contribution in helping to preserve this part of our national narrative.

=== Persephone ===
Valentine’s Persephone was the first public sculpture acquired for Humber College's Lakeshore Campus. It features a modern interpretation of Persephone, the Greek goddess of Spring. The nine-foot tall sculpture is prominently placed in a high traffic area of the college campus, allowing students and faculty to interact with it. "Sometimes the sculpture adopts a tall, quiet presence, while at other times students purposively interact with it through observance and discussion."

=== Barbarians at the Gate ===
This outdoor public installation was named as one of the Best Art Shows of 2013 by the Huffington Post.

Barbarians is a series of five colorful, abstract metal sculptures installed throughout the grounds of the historic Campbell House Museum in downtown Toronto. The show created a stark contrast between the Campbell's 19th-century architecture and Valentine's 21st-century sculptures. Inspired by the mythical creatures of ancient Greece, including the Minotaur and Cerberus, the exhibition "raised questions about the collapse and rebirth of civilizations; about creative destruction; and whether the new replaces the old, or the old is the hidden engine of the new."

=== The 30 Carabob Quartet ===
This sculpture park was the first of its kind to be created in the Toronto suburb of Scarborough. A co-operative effort with architect David Binder, Valentine transposed the sculptures from the Barbarian series to this residential tower landscape, for this permanent, free public exhibit. The creators of the project both say they were inspired and driven to enliven the urban landscape with this installation.

== Exhibitions ==
- Alison Milne Gallery, Canadiana past times and destructive paths 2009
- One 800 Gallery, The New American Dream 2010
- Neubacher Shor Gallery, PARIS 2011
- DeLuca Fine Art, How we roll 2012
- Alison Milne Gallery, Portal 2013
