= Rosedale, Toronto =

Rosedale
- Neighbourhood
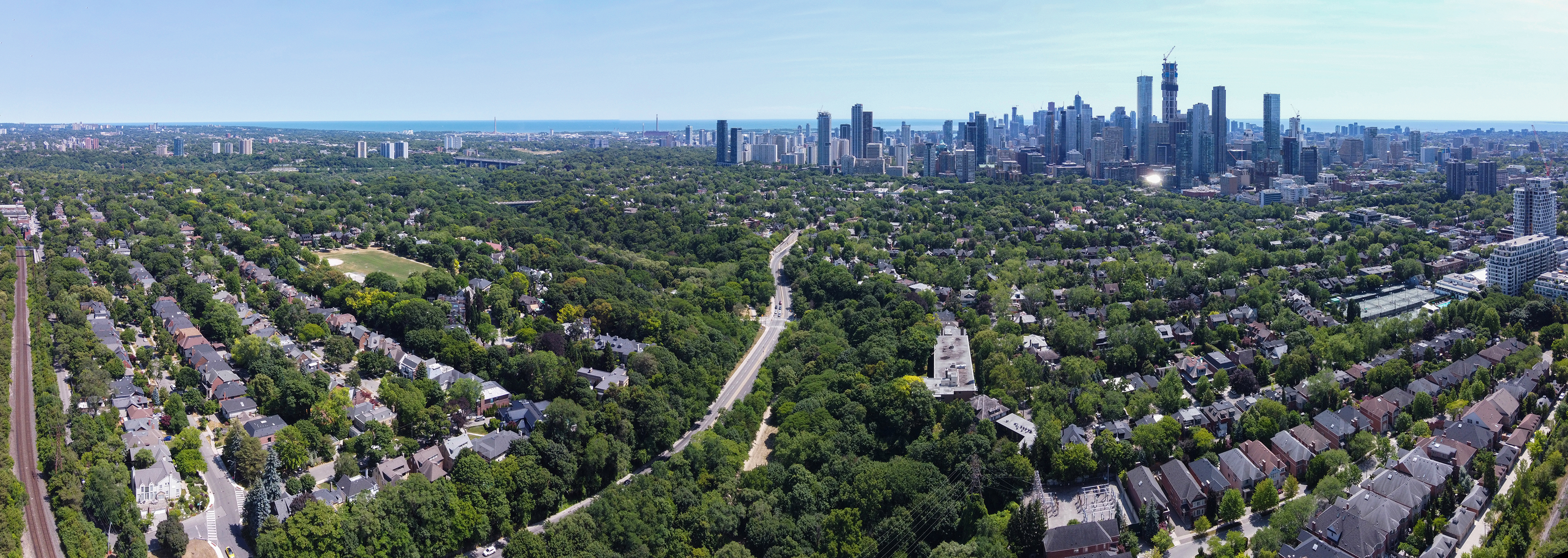
- View of Rosedale to the south of Summerhill

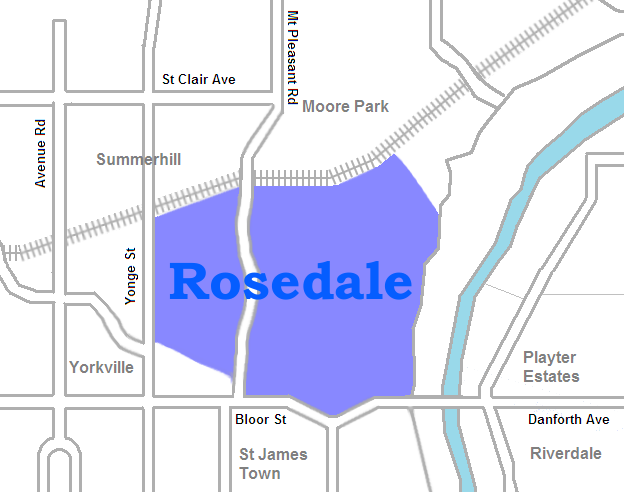
- Vicinity

- Location within Toronto
- Coordinates: 43.679°N 79.378°W
- Country: Canada
- Province: Ontario
- City: Toronto

Area
  - Total: 2.741 km^{2} (1.058 sq mi)

Population (2016)
  - Total: 7,816
  - Density: 2,852/km^{2} (7,390/sq mi)

Rosedale is a neighbourhood in central Toronto, Ontario, Canada. It was formerly the estate of William Botsford Jarvis, and so named by his wife, granddaughter of William Dummer Powell, for the wild roses that grew there in abundance. It is located north of Downtown Toronto and is one of its oldest suburbs. In 2013, Rosedale was ranked the best neighbourhood in Toronto to live in by Toronto Life. According to Today’s Senior Magazine, it is known as the area where the city's 'old money' lives, and is home to some of Canada's richest and most famous citizens including Gerry Schwartz, founder of Onex Corporation, Adrienne Clarkson, the 26th Governor General of Canada, and her husband, the author John Ralston Saul, as well as David Thomson, 3rd Baron Thomson of Fleet of the Thomson Corporation, the latter of whom is the richest man in Canada.

Rosedale's boundaries consist of the Canadian Pacific Railway tracks to the north, Yonge Street to the west, Aylmer Avenue and Rosedale Valley Road to the south, and Bayview Avenue to the east. The neighbourhood is within the City of Toronto's Rosedale-Moore Park neighbourhood. The neighbourhood is divided into a north and south portion by the Park Drive Ravine.

== History ==
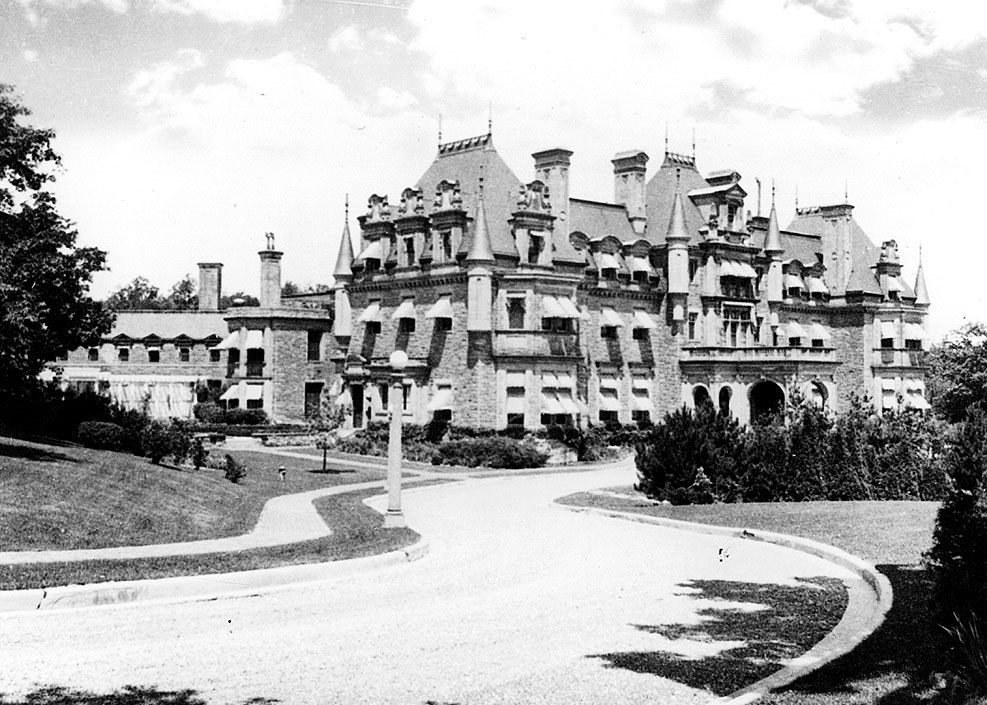
The fourth Government House for Ontario's Lieutenant Governor was located in Rosedale. Built in 1915, it was demolished in 1960, with the area redeveloped to Chorley Park

South Rosedale was first settled by Sheriff William Jarvis and his wife, Mary, in 1826 after Jarvis inherited his father's home there two years earlier. Mary Jarvis, the granddaughter of chief justice and loyalist William Drummer Powell frequently walked and rode on horseback around the trails for that formed Rosedale's meandering streets (which are one of the area's trademarks). She named the estate "Rosedale" as a tribute to the abundance of wild roses that graced the hillsides of their estate. The Jarvis estate was subdivided in 1854 and became Toronto's first "garden suburb". The Jarvis Family sold the Rosedale homestead in 1864, which led to the residential development of the area soon after, including the extension of Cluny Drive.

A noteworthy piece of Rosedale's History, is that it was home to Ontario's fourth Government House. The house was called Chorley Park, and it was built for the Lieutenant Governor in 1915. It was demolished in 1960 by the city of Toronto to save money. It is now a public park of the same name.

=== Notable residents ===
One of Canada's foremost fiction writers both pre- and post-World War II, Morley Callaghan lived in the southern part of Rosedale at 20 Dale Avenue from 1951 until his death in 1990; a historic plaque at the nearby Glen Road footbridge summarizes Callaghan's noteworthy writing career and his best-known literary contemporaries, including Ernest Hemingway and F. Scott Fitzgerald. Hockey Hall of Fame inductees W. A. Hewitt and Foster Hewitt, lived on Roxborough Street at Yonge Street.

== Character ==
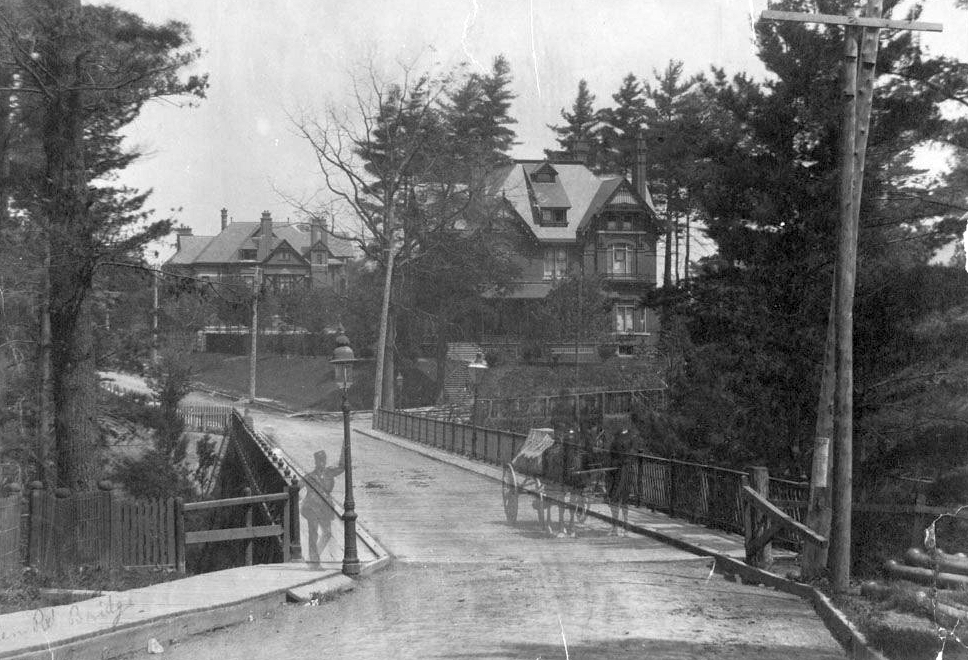
Glen Road bridge at Dale Avenue over the Rosedale valley (circa late 1800s)

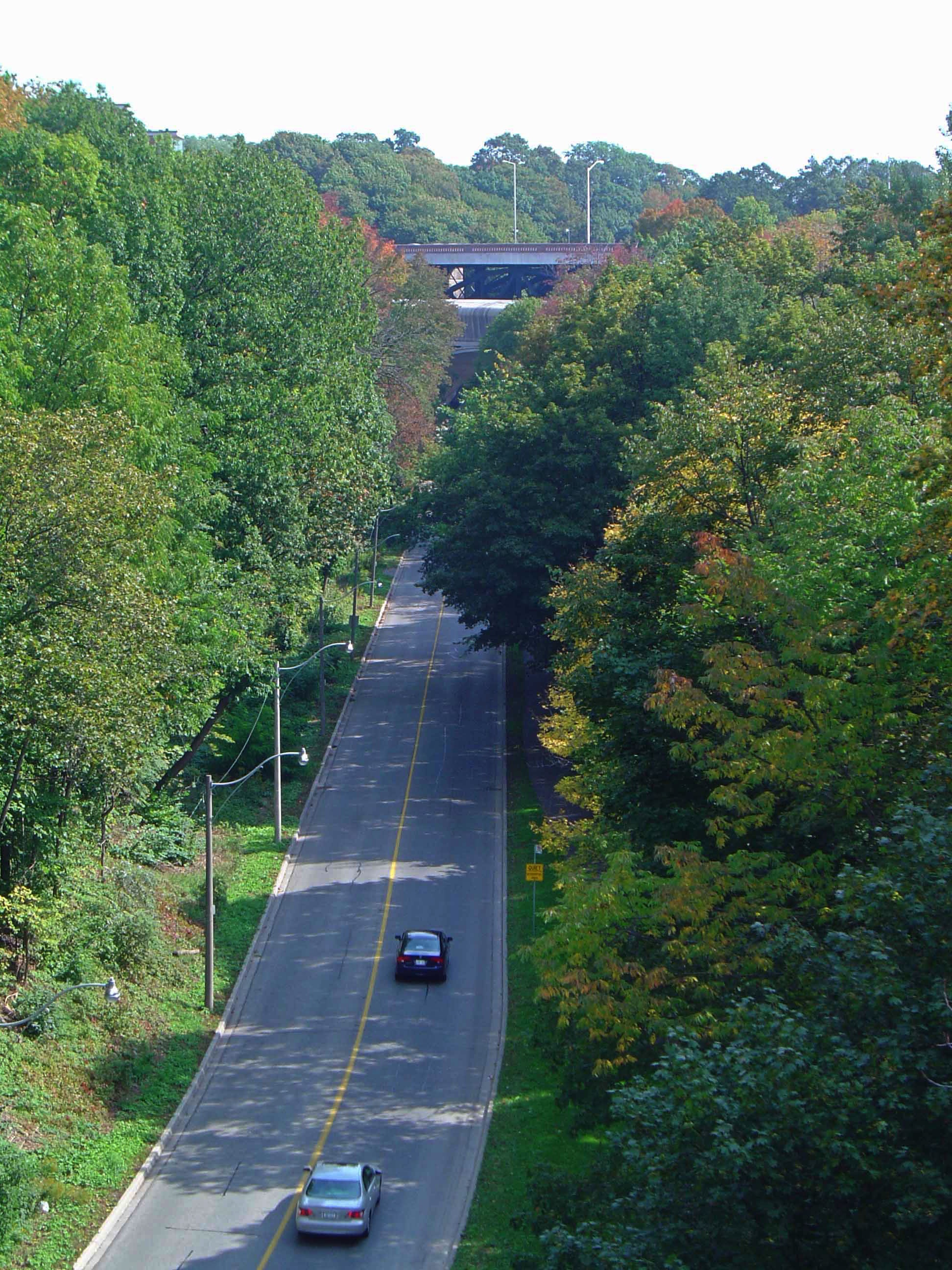
Ravines surround the neighbourhood of Rosedale.

Rosedale is built among three ravines, preserved as parkland. Rosedale is full of cul de sacs and convoluted routes through the neighbourhood, which coupled with other physical boundaries (such as the ravines and bridges) lead to low levels of vehicular traffic. Even though Rosedale is located in the middle of Toronto, virtually no vehicular traffic can be heard with the abundance of trees and foliage that surround the community. The homes are mostly single family detached dwellings, many of which are at least 100 years old including some former farmhouses that are closer to 200. Houses range from Edwardian and Tudor in style to the more common Victorian and Georgian.

Rosedale Park is home to the annual spring park party, Mayfair. The event typically consists of rides, games, flea market and other such carnival-like activities. The event is traditionally on the first Saturday in May and is run and funded by Mooredale House.

According to Census tracts 0086.00 and 0087.00 of the 2006 Canadian census, Rosedale has 7,672 residents, up 4.8% from the 2001 census. The median income in this Census Tract in the 2006 Canadian Census was $55,906, while the average total income in this Census was $165,827, one of the highest incomes of all Toronto neighbourhoods. The median income level was also double that of Canada and Ontario, while the average total income levels were 4.5 to 5 times larger than that of Ontario and Canada. Similarly, the total income levels reflected in the 2011 National Household Survey (NHS) were exceedingly high with the total income median at $61,284, more than double that of Ontario and Canada, and the total income average at $210,484, more than 5 times that of Ontario and Canada. In 2015 the average Rosedale house sold for over $1,800,000. Additionally, Rosedale possesses a large population of people of English, Scottish, and Irish ethnic origin.

=== Important buildings ===
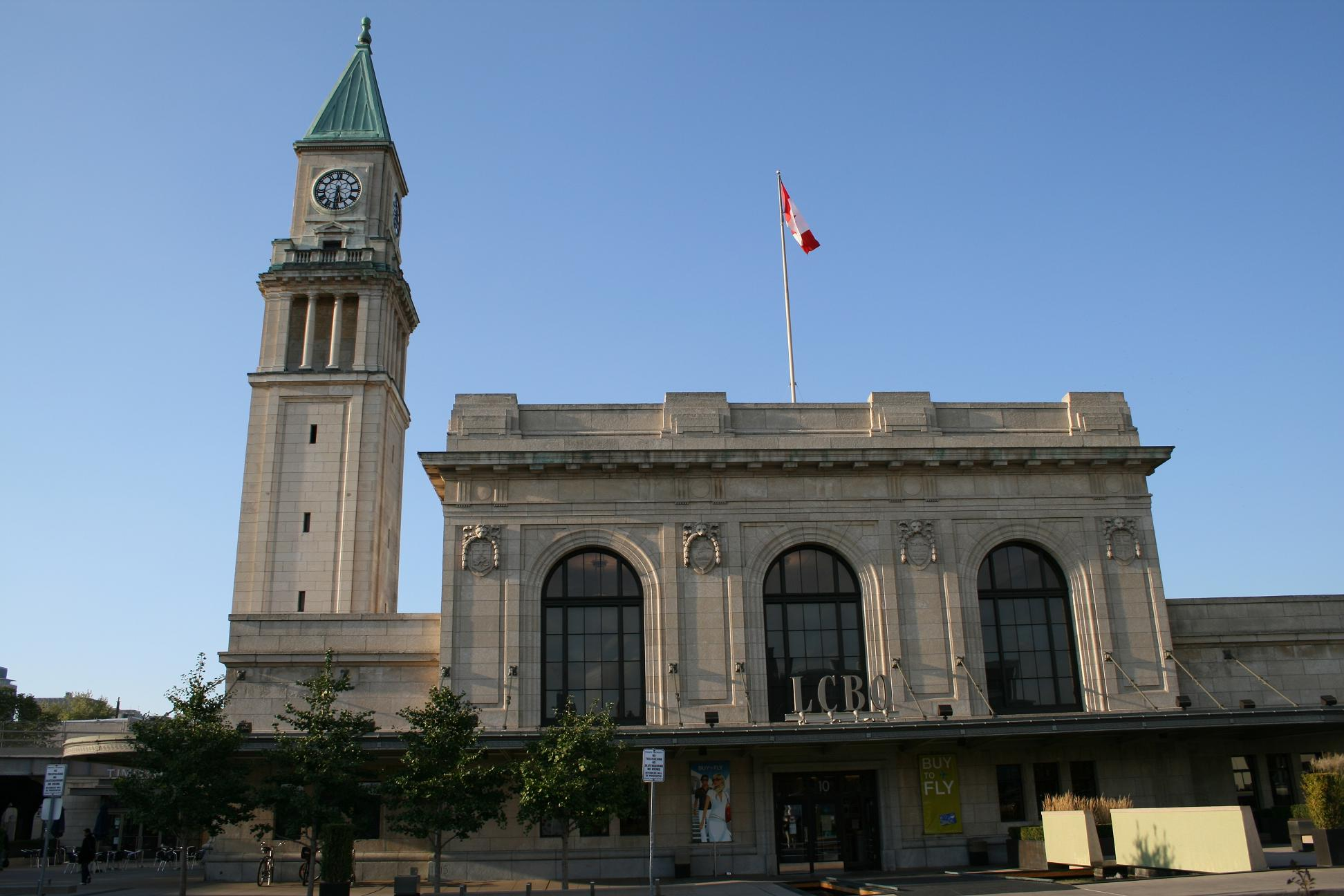
North Toronto station is a former Canadian Pacific Railway station located in northwest Rosedale.

- Integral House
- The Studio Building (25 Severn Street)
- North Toronto station
- University of Toronto President's Estate
- Rosedale Presbyterian Church
- Rosedale United Church

== Education ==
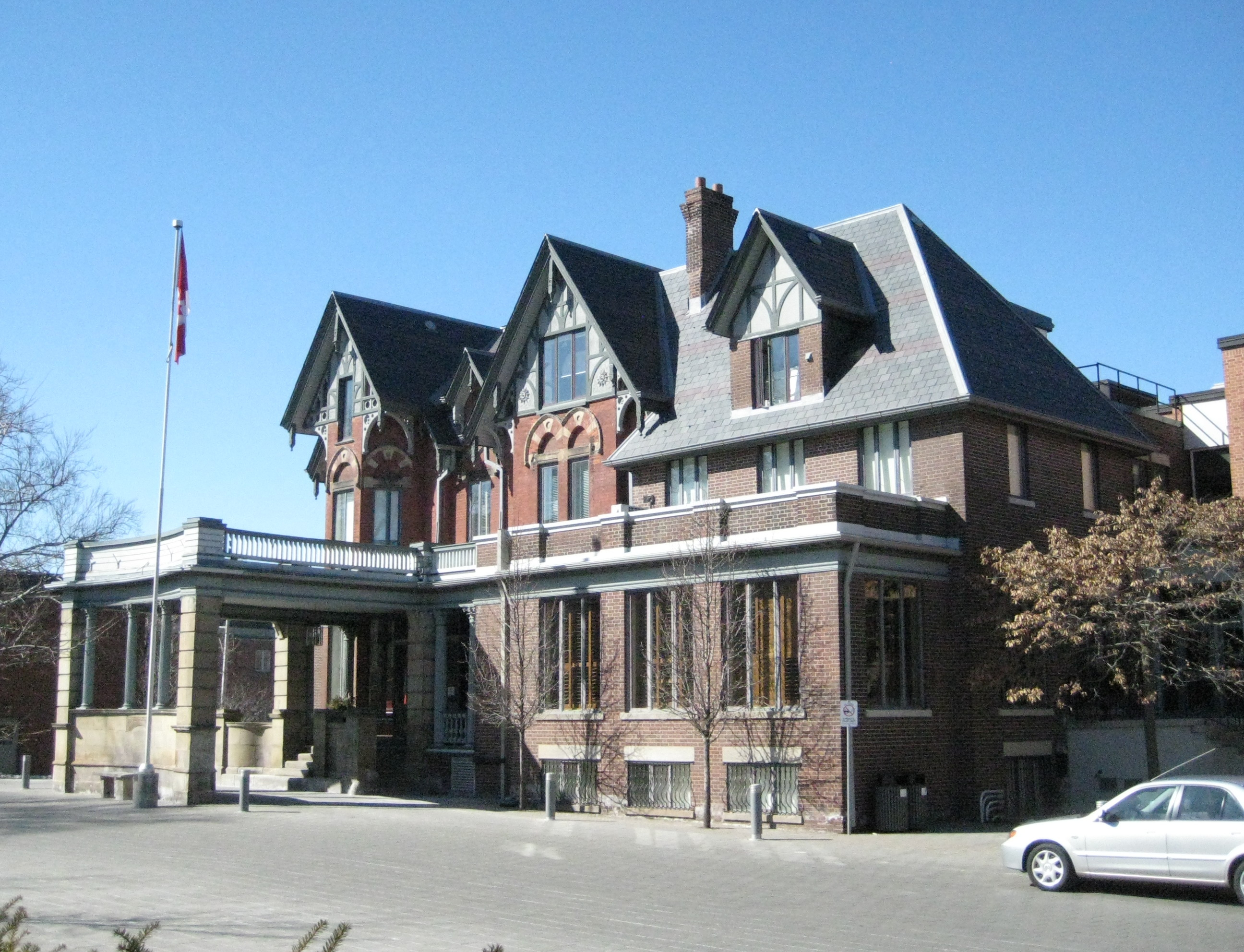
Branksome Hall is an all-girls school located in Rosedale.

=== Public ===
- Rosedale Public School
- Rosedale Heights School of the Arts

=== Private ===
- Branksome Hall - an all-girls school.
- Gradale Academy- an outdoor education school.

== Electoral districts ==
Rosedale is represented in the House of Commons by Danielle Martin and is a part of the Toronto's central district, renamed to University-Rosedale in 2015 and formerly known as Toronto Centre. In Provincial Parliament, Rosedale is also a part of the University-Rosedale electoral district, and is represented by Jessica Bell.

== Music ==
Japanese composer Toru Takemitsu wrote a three-movement piece for solo guitar called "Into the Woods" in 1995 whose second movement "Rosedale" was inspired in this area of Toronto.

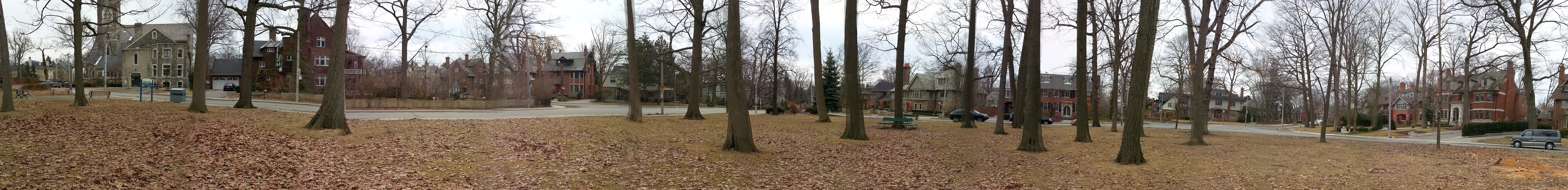
Whitney Park in Rosedale

== Toronto Lawn Tennis Club ==
Rosedale is the location of the Toronto Lawn Tennis Club, the oldest active and surviving lawn tennis club in the world. The club moved to Rosedale in 1913.
