= Anne Murray (gentlewoman) =

Anne Murray Powell (26 April 1755 – 10 March 1849) was an author in Upper Canada, mother of nine children, and the wife of Chief Justice William Dummer Powell.

== Early life ==
Anne Murray was born in Wells, Norfolk, England, to Dr. John Murray and Mary Boyles, the daughter of a customs collector. Her father was born in Scotland and became a surgeon in the Royal Navy. In 1751, he graduated from the University of Edinburgh and retired on half-pay from the Navy in order to establish himself with a private medical practice at Wells and then Norwich. He was remembered as one "who distinguished himself by encouraging every charitable pursuit". He was involved in the formation of the Scots Society in 1775. Anne Murray was born on 26 April 1755. In 1769 Anne Murray's aunt Elizabeth Murray, who was a successful widowed shopkeeper in Boston Massachusetts, offered to care for Dr. Murray's three oldest children John (II), Mary, and Anne. Anne's brother and sister were sent in 1769 while Anne did not voyage to Boston until Elizabeth's departure in 1771. In 1774 Anne's sister Mary left for England leaving Anne in charge of her aunt Elizabeth's shop, Anne would later refer to this as "the worst time of my life". Anne found relief from this "mundane" life when she met William Dummer Powell in 1775.

== Adult life and career ==
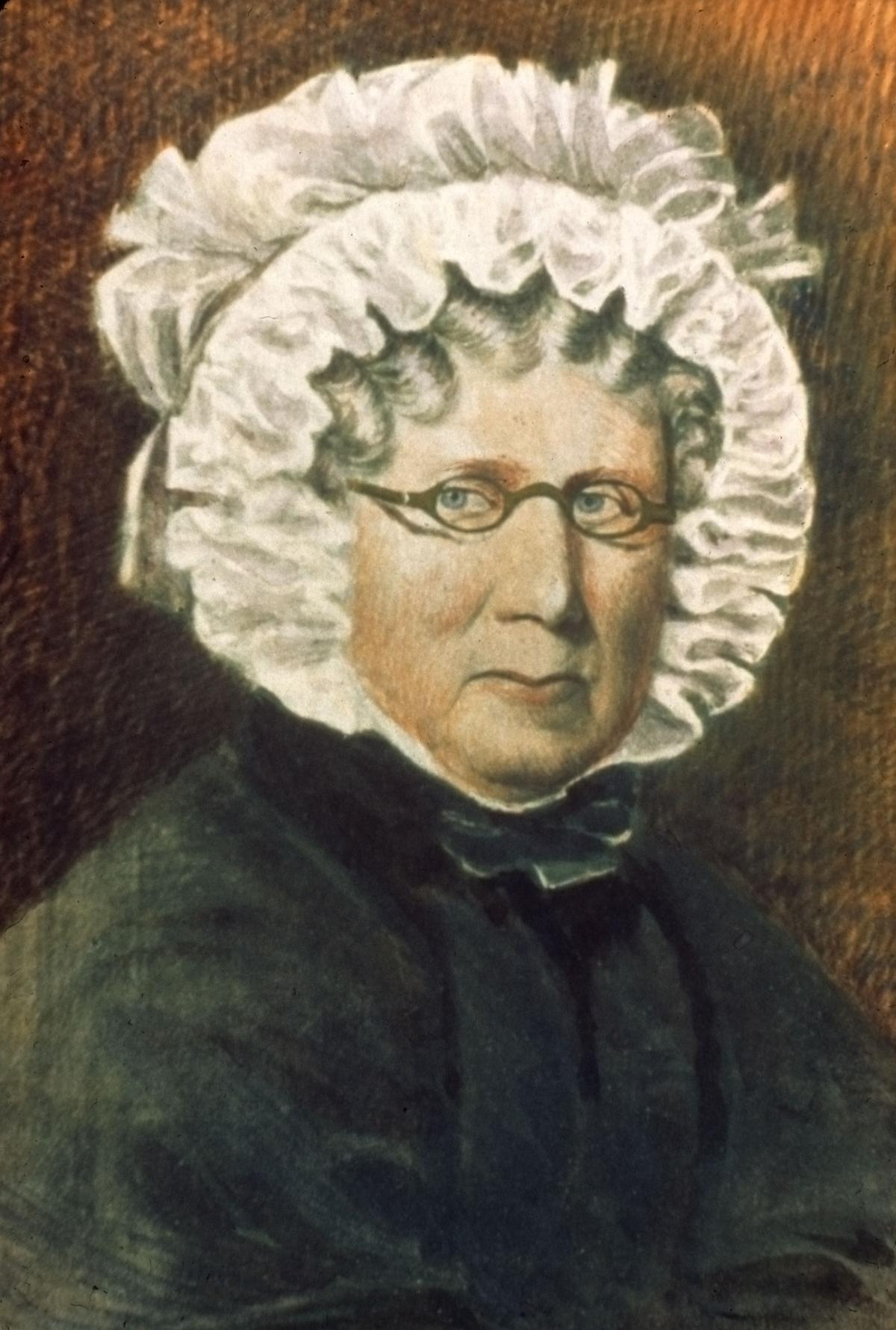
Portrait of Mrs. William Dummer Powell, 1834

Murray married William Dummer Powell on 3 October 1775 in Boston, Massachusetts. They had nine children, of whom two survived her. After marrying William Dummer Powell, they left for England due to William's political views as a member of the loyalist party. In 1780 the family left England for Montreal, where William started a law practice. They moved to York in 1798 as a way for "members of the elite to have a role in Upper Canadian government". Anne took on a serious role in the Upper Canadian political sphere with her role as the wife of a prominent official, which would be crucial for William's future climb to chief justiceship.

Murray was considered the "social arbiter" of Toronto in the years preceding her husband's death on 6 September 1834. She is best known for challenging then Lieutenant Governor of Upper Canada Francis Gore. She publicly challenged Gore on his treatment of Mrs. John Small who was accused of adultery.

Murray and her husband have one of the largest surviving record of personal letters from the period of 1771-1840. "Throughout her long life, Mrs Powell was an inveterate writer of letters. More than 700 of them have survived describing the excitement of enemy invasion in 1813 and armed rebellion in 1837, and the 'system of wrong and Robbery' embodied in the 1839 Clergy Reserves bill".

Murray died in Toronto on 10 March 1849 just before her 94th birthday.
