= William Dummer Powell =

Upper Canada lawyer and judge (1755-1834)

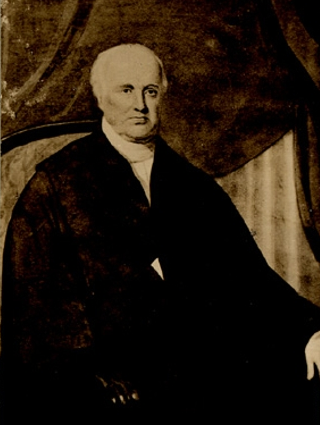
- William Dummer Powell
- Born: November 5, 1755; Boston, Province of Massachusetts Bay, British America
- Died: September 6, 1834; Toronto, Upper Canada, British North America
- Occupations: Lawyer, judge and politician

William Dummer Powell (November 5, 1755 – September 6, 1834) was a Loyalist lawyer, judge and political figure in Upper Canada.

== Early life and education ==
Born at Boston, Massachusetts, he was named for his grandmother's brother William Dummer, Lieutenant Governor of Massachusetts. He was the eldest son of John Powell (1716–1794), a prosperous merchant who for thirty years held the contract for provisioning the Royal Navy before fleeing to England after the revolution. His mother, Janet (1728–1795), was the daughter of Sweton (or Suetonius) Grant (1702–1744), of Newport, Rhode Island. Grant was a member of the Grant Baronets of Dalvey and Gartenbeg, who was probably involved in the slave trade and started a gunpowder business in Boston. Grant was killed by an explosion.

Powell studied in Boston before being sent to England under the care of his maternal relative, Sir Alexander Grant, who sent him to board at Tonbridge School. Having in four years excelled at nothing other than cricket, he was next sent him to live with a merchant at Rotterdam where he was to learn French and Dutch while gaining a first-hand experience in business. Having returned to Boston in 1772, two years later he started his legal career in the offices of Jonathan Sewell, Attorney General of Massachusetts. After his marriage, he returned to England in 1775 where he studied law at the Middle Temple.

== Career ==
As a Loyalist, Powell went to Quebec in 1779, entering private practice in Montreal. In 1783, he went to England to petition with other delegates against the Quebec Act. His formal call to the English bar, delayed because of finances, was finally arranged in 1784 and, later that year, he returned to Boston to attempt to recover his father's property which had been confiscated after the American Revolution. Unsuccessful, he returned to Montreal in 1785.

In 1789, he was appointed judge in the Western District. He lived in Detroit but the court sat at L'Assomption (Windsor). In 1794, he was appointed to the Court of King's Bench for Upper Canada and moved to Newark (Niagara-on-the-Lake). In 1808, he was appointed to the Executive Council for the province. He settled at York (Toronto) and remained there during the American occupation during the War of 1812. He opposed the suspension of habeas corpus during the war. In 1814, he assisted Chief Justice Thomas Scott by presiding over several of the trials known as the "Bloody Assize" which were held at Ancaster to prosecute those charged with treason during the war.

When Chief Justice Thomas Scott was no longer able to chair the Executive Council in 1816, Powell took on that post, and also replaced him as Chief Justice later that same year.

He upset the province's administration by rejecting many of the charges brought by Lord Selkirk against those who had stirred up trouble for the Red River Colony. In 1823, he refused to swear in Alexander Wood as a commissioner for war claims arising from the War of 1812; Powell had originally opposed his appointment on moral grounds. Wood successfully sued him for damages. Although he opposed prosecuting Robert Fleming Gourlay for attacks on the administration of the province, he found himself forced to banish Gourlay from the province for sedition. In 1825, after he was rebuked by the Executive Council for exposing the administration to criticism, he resigned from that council; he was succeeded by William Campbell as Chief Justice later that year. He died in Toronto in 1834.

== Family ==
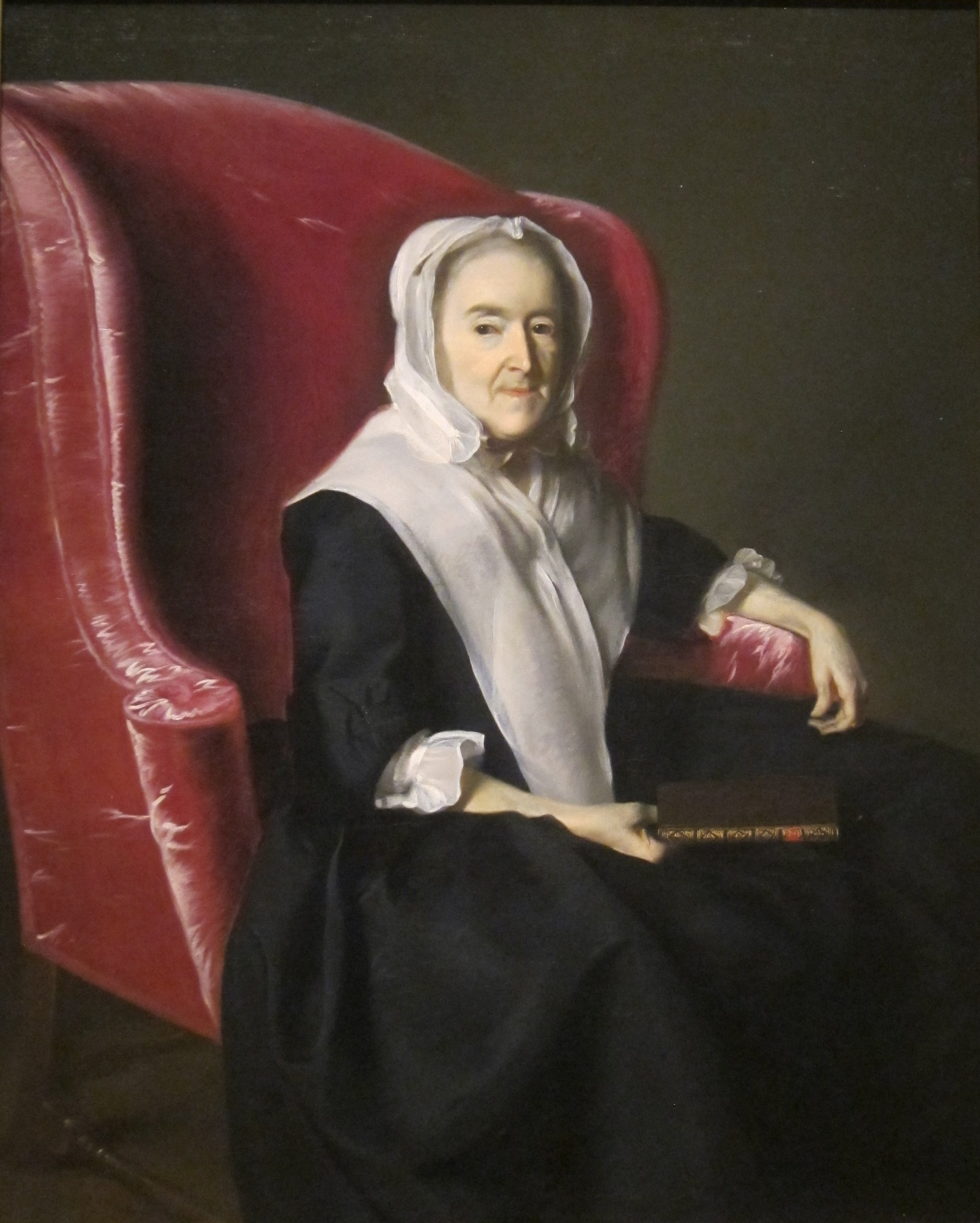
Mrs. Anna Dummer Powell, Powell's grandmother painted in 1764 by John Singleton Copley

In 1775, Powell married Anne Murray, daughter of Dr John Murray (b.1720) and Mary Boyles. John Murray was born in Scotland and became a surgeon in the Royal Navy. He established himself with a private medical practice at Wells and then Norwich, before moving to Boston.

They were survived by two children. Their son, Captain John Powell of Brockamour Manor, Niagara-on-the-Lake, married a daughter of General Æneas Shaw and they were the parents of John Powell, alderman and mayor of Toronto.

Justice William Powell was described as a dedicated family man, sitting in the middle of his family in his pew at church. His daughter died in 1822 when a boat she was on sank. The packet ship, the Albion, was one of the finest class of ships that operated between Liverpool and New York. She was scheduled to come to York on the previous voyage, but missed it for an unknown reason.

== Legacy ==
Powell sold the north half of his Park Lot 12 to provide land for King's College (now the University of Toronto).

Legal offices
Preceded by Thomas Scott; 1806–1816	Chief Justice of Upper Canada; 1816–1825	Succeeded by William Campbell
