= Denison family =

- Current region: York, Ontario
- Members: Frederick Charles Denison; George Taylor Denison; George Taylor Denison II; George Taylor Denison III; John Denison I; John Denison II
- Motto: Perseverando (Perseverance)

The Denison family was an influential, land-holding family in the development of the town of York, Ontario, present-day Toronto. During the 19th century, many figures in the Denison family held a moderate degree of political authority and contributed significantly to the heritage and politics of Toronto.

== History ==
Captain John Denison immigrated to York with his wife Sophia, and sons George, Thomas and Charles, after a personal invitation from John Graves Simcoe to come to the newly formed York. He lived in Castle Frank for a short period, but as English-speaking Anglican Protestants, the Denison Family received land grants: 100-acre (0.40 km^{2}) park lots in the family's name, developed into manor homes, farms and residences over the decades that followed.

In 1815, Colonel George Taylor Denison, son of Captain John Denison, bought park lots 17 and 18 and built the Bellevue Homestead. The original road up to the homestead is now known as Denison Avenue in Toronto.

The Denison family had land holdings in west Toronto, with the family manor, Bellevue House, located in what is now Kensington Market. Numerous landmarks and streets in this neighbourhood and around west Toronto are named after the Denison family, including Denison Square, Avenue and Creek, Bellevue Avenue, Dovercourt Road, Rusholme Road, Ossington, Major, Robert, Borden, Lippincott streets. Denison Avenue used to be the family's driveway from their house to Queen Street. St. Stephen's-in-the-Field Church, the first Anglican Church west of Spadina, was founded and paid for entirely by Captain John's grandson, Robert Brittain Denison, as a parish church for farm workers on his estate. The Kensington Market that is still presently used today was born out of a Denison family estate, the Belle Vue.

"John Denison, the first Canadian Denison, began life in York (Toronto) managing someone else's farm; his son rented land to more than a hundred tenants, and his grandson developed the same land into urban residential sites. The Denison record, in effect, is the record of an evolving urban community." This ownership of land and the development of land is how the Denison family accumulated their fortunes.

Another notable Denison was George Taylor Denison III, great-grandson of John Denison. He presided over the Toronto police court for 44 years and he had a reputation for an unconventional practice of law. The position of wealth and privilege accompanying land-ownership in Victorian Toronto afforded George Taylor Denison the opportunities that made these accomplishments possible. His grandfather fought with Gen. Isaac Brock in the War of 1812.

George Taylor Denison was an enthusiastic supporter of the Confederate cause at the time of the American Civil War. His home became a gathering place for Confederate sympathizers and agents. As Norman Knowles states in the Dictionary of Canadian Biography, Denison’s “identification with the South came naturally: it represented an idyllic society that embodied the social order, conservative values, and chivalric traditions he wished to see maintained in British North America. He drew parallels between his loyalist ancestors, who had fought to uphold their principles against the demagoguery of American patriots, and the southerners, who were struggling to preserve their identity and way of life. Fearing the consequences of a northern victory for the future of British North America, Denison actively backed the Confederate cause despite Britain’s official neutrality. In September 1864 he received a visit from his uncle George Dewson of Florida, who had been commissioned to assess support for the Confederacy in British North America. Denison’s farm home, Heydon Villa, on his father’s estate in west Toronto, became a haven for Confederate agents, exiles, and sympathizers and a clearing house for smuggled documents. He also became involved in efforts to purchase the steamer Georgian, which was to be used as a raider on the Great Lakes. The diplomatic crisis and lawsuits that followed the discovery of this plan effectively ended his prospects for a full-time military career, a disappointment that repeated promises from politicians and his own tireless efforts could not reverse.”

The Denisons played a consistent role in public life, involving themselves in issues affecting the growth and direction of Canadian nationhood. As soldiers, Loyalists, nationalists, and imperialists they played active roles in the War of 1812, the rebellion of 1837, the militia crises of 1854–1864, the Canada First movement, the loyalist crisis of 1888–1891, and the struggle for imperial unity 1893–1911.

== Family crest ==
The Denison family crest is a hand, its index finger pointing towards a star. For John Denison, that star was the North Star. The Denison's family motto, displayed on the family crest, is Perseverando ('Perseverance' in English).

== Family tree ==
- John Denison (November 20, 1755, Yorkshire – October 28, 1824, York, Upper Canada), m. Sophia Taylor
  - George Taylor Denison (December 29, 1783, England – December 18, 1853, Toronto, Canada West)
    - Richard Lippincott Denison (June 13, 1814 - March 10, 1878)
      - Herbert Francis Denison (January 22, 1855 - February 10, 1916)
        - Norman Lippincott Denison (January 1, 1889 - October 18, 1958)
          - John Burton Denison (June 30, 1916 - January 6, 2001)
    - George Taylor Denison II (July 17, 1816, York, Upper Canada – May 30, 1873, Toronto, Ontario)
      - George Taylor Denison III (31 August 1839, Toronto, Ontario – 6 June 1925, Toronto, Ontario)
      - Frederick Charles Denison (November 22, 1846 – April 15, 1896)
      - John Denison II
  - Thomas Denison (November 1, 1786- August 23, 1846)
  - Charles Denison (1789 - August 15, 1828)
