= George Denison =

George Denison may refer to:

- George Denison (American politician) (1790–1831), United States Representative from Pennsylvania
- George Denison (priest) (1805–1896), English churchman
- George Denison (Canadian politician) (1822–1902)
- George Taylor Denison (1783–1853), Canadian soldier and community leader
- George Taylor Denison II (1816–1873), Canadian lawyer and military officer
- George Taylor Denison III (1839–1925), Canadian soldier and publicist

== See also ==
- George Dennison (1925–1987), American author
- George M. Dennison (1935–2017), president of the University of Montana
