= York Militia =

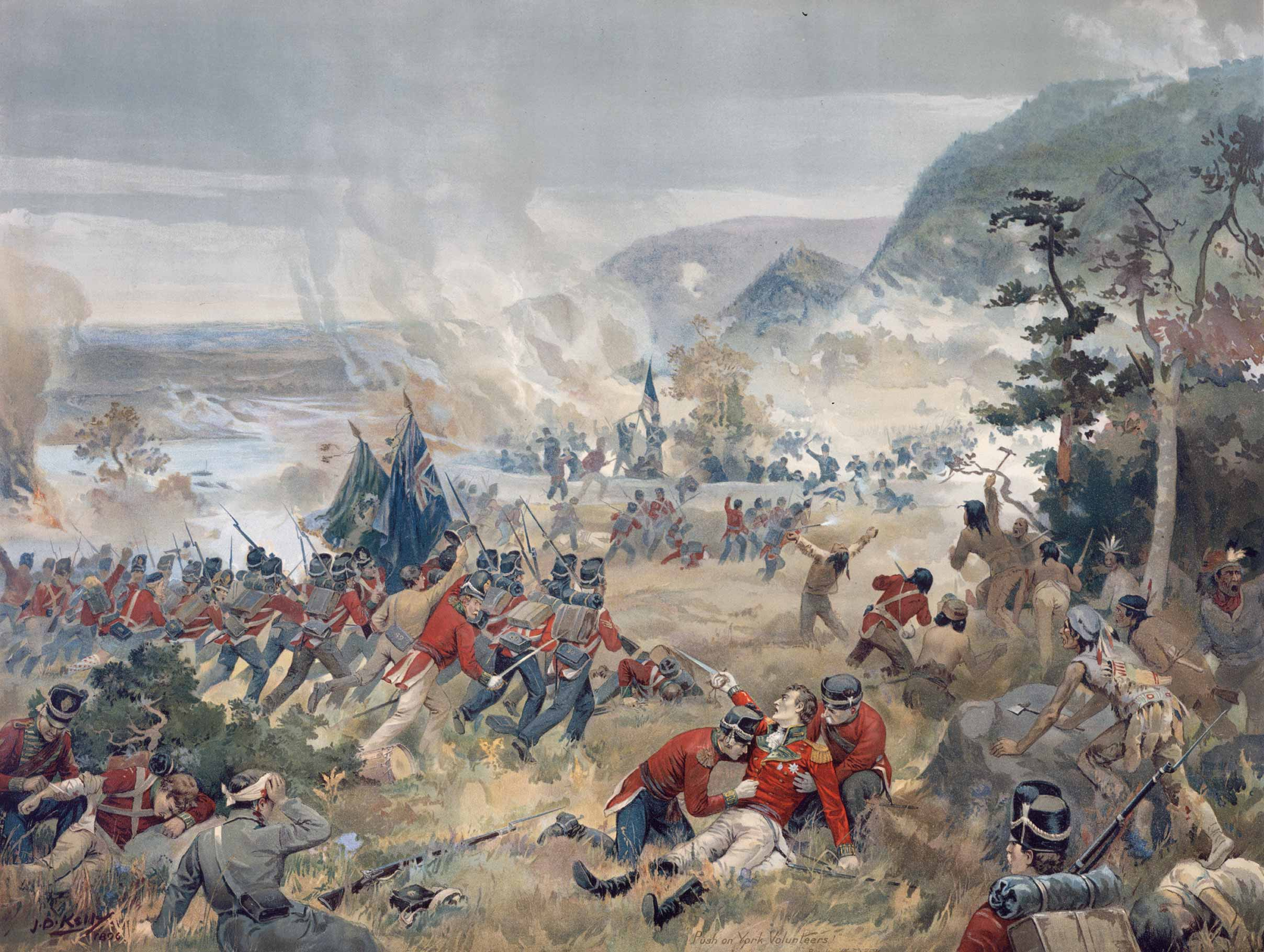
- The 2nd Regiment of York Militia (left foreground) at the Battle of Queenston Heights
- Active: c. 1793–1866
- Country: Upper Canada
- Allegiance: British Empire
- Branch: Canadian Militia
- Type: Militia
- Size: 3 regiments
- Garrison/HQ: York County, Ontario
- Nickname: "The York Volunteers"
- Engagements: War of 1812; Siege of Detroit; Battle of Queenston Heights; Battle of York; Battle of Lundy's Lane; Rebellions of 1837–1838; Battle of Montgomery's Tavern; Raid on Short Hills; Fenian Raids

The York County Militia, commonly known as the York Militia, was a formation of the Canadian Militia. It was created in the British colony of Upper Canada in 1793 following the colony's passage of a Militia Act in the same year. The York Militia, which eventually comprised three regiments, recruited from white colonists in York County, Ontario and served in the War of 1812 and Rebellions of 1837–1838 before being dissolved in 1866.

== Orgaization ==
By 1812, the York Militia consisted of 3 line infantry regiments:

| Regiment | Principal recruiting area |
|---|---|
| 1st Regiment of York Militia | |
| 2nd Regiment of York Militia | recruited around the present-day Halton and Peel Regions: the townships of Toronto, Trafalgar, Flamborough East and Flamborough West, Nelson, Ancaster, Barton, Beverly, and Saltfleet, which mainly composed the western Wentworth. |
| 3rd Regiment of York Militia | recruited around the present-day York Region (Markham), Toronto (Scarborough, old Town of York later as Toronto, Etobicoke) and Durham (Pickering and Whitby). |

*The 3rd Regiment of York Militia can be partially traced back to John Button's 1st York Light Dragoons (c. 1810) from Markham, Ontario.

== War of 1812 ==
The three regiments of the York Militia fought in several engagements during the War of 1812.

The 1st Regiment of the York Militia was involved at the Siege of Fort Mackinac, the Siege of Detroit, the Battle of Queenston Heights, and the Battle of York.

The 2nd Regiment of the York Militia fought at Detroit, Queenston Heights, and at the Battle of Lundy's Lane

The 3rd Regiment of the York Militia fought at Detroit, Queenston Heights, and York.

== Upper Canada Rebellion ==
The York Militia would see active service again during the Upper Canada Rebellion and the Patriot War of 1838; most notably seeing action at the Battle of Montgomery's Tavern and along the Niagara Peninsula (the Short Hill Raid). Among the units raised during the rebellion were the Queen's Rangers led by Samuel Jarvis.

== Fenian Raids ==
Following the 1866 Fenian Raids, the York Militia was reorganized into the new Non-Permanent Active Militia [NPAM], becoming the 12th York Rangers.

== Perpetuation ==
Within the Canadian Army, the 1st and 3rd Regiments of York Militia are perpetuated by the Queen's York Rangers (1st American Regiment) while the 2nd Regiment is perpetuated by the Royal Hamilton Light Infantry (Wentworth Regiment). As such, these units carry on their colours the War of 1812 battle honours won by the York Militia:

- Defence of Canada – 1812–1815 – Défense du Canada
- Detroit
- Queenston
- Niagara

== Notable Members ==
- Major General Æneas Shaw
- Colonel James FitzGibbon
- Colonel Archibald McLean
- Colonel Edward William Thomson
- Colonel Alexander Macdonell
- Lieutenant Colonel John Macdonell
- Lieutenant Colonel Samuel Peters Jarvis
- Lieutenant Colonel Henry Sherwood
- Lieutenant Colonel Richard Beasley
- Lieutenant Colonel William Thompson
- Major John Button
- Major William Allan
- Major Benjamin Milliken II
- Captain George Taylor Denison
- Colonel George Taylor Denison II
- Captain John Beverley Robinson
- Captain Allan MacNab
- Captain William Chisholm
- Captain Samuel Smith MacDonell
- Benajah Mallory

== See also ==
- Canadian units of the War of 1812
- The Bold Canadian
