= Sulte =

Sulte is a surname. Notable people with the surname include:

- Benjamin Sulte (1841–1923), Canadian journalist, writer, civil servant, and historian
- Hunter Sulte (born 2002), American soccer player
