= Governor General's Body Guard =

Canadian military unit

- Active: 1822–1936
- Country: Canada
- Branch: Canadian Militia
- Type: Horse guards
- Role: Cavalry
- Size: Independent troop (1822–1876); Independent squadron (1876–1889); Regiment (1889–1936)
- Part of: Non-Permanent Active Militia
- Garrison/HQ: Toronto Armories
- Motto: Nulli secundus (Latin for 'second to none')
- Engagements: Upper Canada Rebellion; Fenian Raids; North-West Rebellion; Second Boer War; First World War
- Battle honours: See #Battle Honours

The Governor General's Body Guard was a royal guard regiment of the Canadian Militia that formed part of the country's household troops. The Body Guard was the senior regiment of the Non-Permanent Active Militia and the equivalent of the British Army's Life Guards and Royal Horse Guards. In 1936 the regiment amalgamated with the Mississauga Horse to become the Governor General's Horse Guards.

== Lineage ==
=== The Governor General's Body Guard ===
- Originated in 1810 as Button's Troop
- Formed on 16 August 1822 as the York Dragoons from the 1st West York Regiment of Volunteer Infantry
- Redesignated in 1837 as the Queen's Light Dragoons for duty during the 1837 rebellion
- Separated in 1839 as an independent unit from its parent infantry battalion
- Redesignated on 27 December 1855 as the 1st Toronto Troop of The Volunteer Militia Cavalry of the County of York
- Redesignated on 27 April 1866 as The Governor General's Body Guard for Upper Canada
- Redesignated on 1 July 1867 as The Governor General's Body Guard for Ontario
- Reorganized on 5 May 1876 as a two troop squadron
- Reorganized on 17 May 1889 as a full regiment
- Redesignated on 13 July 1895 as The Governor General's Body Guard
- Amalgamated on 15 December 1936 with The Mississauga Horse and redesignated as the Governor General's Horse Guards

== History ==
=== Early history ===
The regiment dates as far back as 1822 in York, Upper Canada (now Toronto). For the remainder of the 19th century this troop was recognized as the cavalry of the city of Toronto. It has links to the 1st York Light Dragoons formed in 1810 by Captain (later Major) John Button or Button's Troop (commanded until 1831). Also known as 'Denison's Troop', it began as the York Dragoons under the command of Captain George Taylor Denison I. Under the Militia Act of 1793, service in the militia was mandatory for all healthy male citizens aged 16 to 60 years. Like most militia in Canada during this period, the Dragoons were raised and financed by wealthy gentry, in this case the Denison family, as volunteers were not part of a regular army. The Dragoons began as a local mounted infantry company linked to the parent West York Regiment of Militia. This peculiar organization was a practice that started during the American Revolution with the Loyalist militia regiment the "Queen's York Rangers". Light cavalry was needed to provide dispatch duty, scouting, flank protection and picketing for the infantry battalion. Full militia cavalry regiments were too expensive to operate and large scale cavalry operations were of little use in the dense forests of eastern North America. The cavalry troop was sufficient to serve the purpose and militia infantry were allowed to raise cavalry troops under the Militia Act of 1808. This unit, like many local military units, was made up of volunteers and formed to supplement the presence of British Army units in Upper Canada. The company or troop broke from the parent infantry battalion and became an independent troop of cavalry in 1839.

=== Upper Canada Rebellion ===
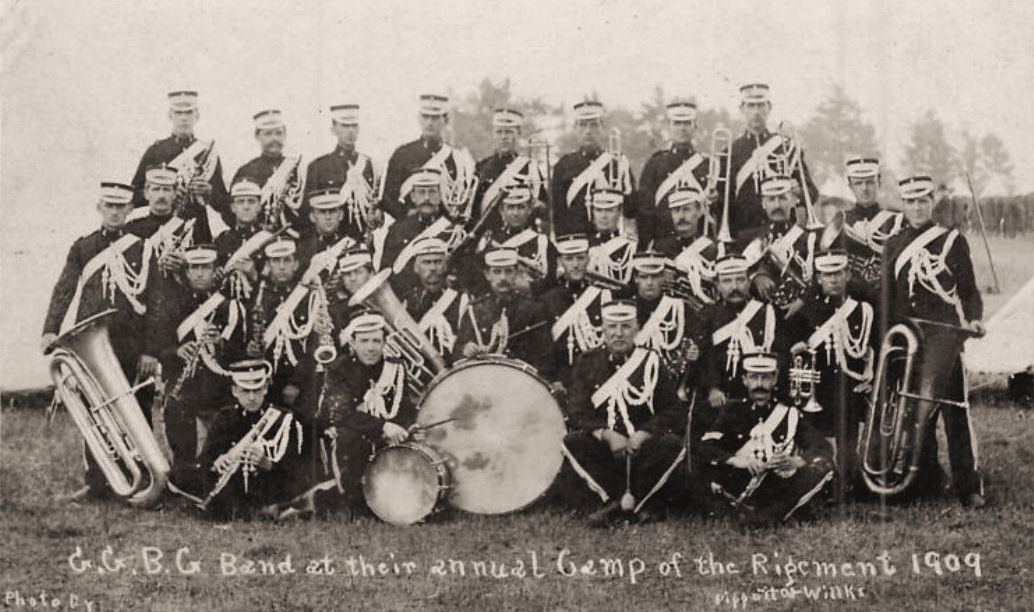
The Governor General's Body Guard Band at a regimental camp in Toronto, 1909.

The troop was one of only two fully uniformed militia units to rally to the flag with the threat of unrest and rebellion within the colony, in 1837. The troop was given new uniforms, fully armed and redesignated the "Queens Light Dragoons" (QLD). Operating alongside the local Markham Troop, forming a squadron, the QLD participated in a number of actions during the rebellion to include Gallows Hill, Navy Island and Town of Scotland. The Toronto troop was on active service for several months during this crisis.

=== Fenian Raids ===
In 1866, the troop was the only cavalry in Upper Canada to be placed on active duty, engaged and employed against the Fenian Irish Republican Army invasion from the United States. The troop lead Col Peacock's Column to meet the Fenian force along the Niagara Peninsula as scouts. The troop was the first unit to enter and relieve the town of Fort Erie - capturing several Fenians before they escaped across the Niagara River. The Fenian force was defeated and many of its members arrested by Canadian and American authorities.

=== Late–19th Century ===
By the mid-19th century, Britain began to pull its army out of Canada for the Crimea War and the need to establish a Canadian army became clear. With the enactment of the Militia Act of 1855, the Canadian Militia Department was established. Under the act, the Canadian Militia unit establishment was drafted by the new department. Local militia units for the first time were recognized as standing units to become a more critical part of the defence of Canada. In 1847 the unit was gazetted and became known as the 1st Toronto Independent Troop of Cavalry. It was renamed again in 1855 as the 1st Troop of Volunteer Militia Cavalry of the County of York and placed on the Militia list 27 Sept 1855. In 1866 it was renamed 1st York Troop The Governor General's Body Guard for Upper Canada and in 1867 became The Governor General's Body Guard for Ontario. After British forces completely left Canada in 1870 the Canadian Government raised a small regular force and began to look at reorganizing the Militia cavalry into full regiments. Most of the independent troops across the country were amalgamated into numbered regiments of dragoons or hussars during the 1870s. The GGBG was the only non-numbered corps and was expanded to squadron strength in 1876. With a final rationalization of the Canadian Cavalry Corps in 1889, the GGBG was brought to full regimental strength with the amalgamation of the local Markham and Oak Ridges Troops of the 2nd Regiment of Cavalry (later the 2nd Dragoons). The name was changed a final time in 1895 to The Governor General's Body Guard of Canada.

=== North-West Rebellion ===
The GGBG was mobilized as a full squadron and participated in putting down the North-West Rebellion in 1885 as rear-area security for General Frederick Dobson Middleton's force. The squadron's task was to protect the main supply route for the force in place with routine patrols from the rail line to Batoche and to secure the only supply depot and telegraph station at Humboldt. A fort was built, consisting of an earthen berm, around the telegraph station and named "Fort Denison" after the squadron's commander, Lieutenant-Colonel George Taylor Denison III. Middleton's force defeated the Métis at Batoche.

=== South African War ===
The GGBG, as a regiment, supplied some 50 men to augment the small Canadian Regular Army for service in South Africa in 1900. Lieutenant Hampden Cockburn earned the Victoria Cross while serving as a volunteer with the Royal Canadian Dragoons during the war.

=== Great War ===
The GGBG, like all of the militia during the First World War, was not activated for duty, but rather assisted in raising numbered battalions for the Canadian Expeditionary Force and recruiting to fill the CEF ranks. Thousands of Toronto's citizens were recruited through the GGBG for service in the trenches. The GGBG supplied soldiers for the 3rd Bn, 2nd Bn, 4th CMR, 216th Bn, 124th Bn to name a few.

=== 1920s–1930s ===
In 1936 the regiment was amalgamated with The Mississauga Horse to become the Governor General's Horse Guards.

== Campaigns ==
- Rebellions of 1837–1838 / Upper Canada Rebellion
- Fenian Raids 1866
- North-West Rebellion 1885
- Boer War (1899)
- First World War 1914–1918

== Organization ==
=== The Governor General's Body Guard for Ontario (17 May 1889) ===
- A Troop (York, Ontario)
- B Troop (York, Ontario)
- C Troop (Oak Ridges, Ontario) (redesignation of No. 2 Troop, 2nd Regiment of Cavalry)
- D Troop (Markham, Ontario) (redesignation of No. 3 Troop, 2nd Regiment of Cavalry)

=== The Governor General's Body Guard (1 March 1921) ===
- Regimental Headquarters (Toronto, Ontario)
- A Squadron (Toronto, Ontario)
- B Squadron (Toronto, Ontario)
- C Squadron (Toronto, Ontario)

== Battle honours ==
=== North-West Rebellion ===
- North West Canada, 1885

=== South African War ===
- South Africa, 1899–1900

=== Great War ===
- Mount Sorrel
- Somme, 1916
- Flers-Courcelette
- Ancre Heights
- Arras, 1917, '18
- Vimy, 1917
- Ypres, 1917
- Hill 70
- Passchendaele
- Amiens
- Scarpe, 1918
- Hindenburg Line
- Canal du Nord
- Cambrai, 1918
- Valenciennes
- Sambre
- France and Flanders, 1915–18

== Notable members ==
- Major Hampden Cockburn, VC: Boer War, with the Royal Canadian Dragoons
- Captain George Taylor Denison: first organized the preceding York Dragoons in 1822 and commanded the unit during the Upper Canada Rebellion
- Colonel George Taylor Denison II: served in the Upper Canada Rebellion and later commanded the Toronto garrison during the 1866 Fenian Raids
- Lieutenant Colonel George Taylor Denison III, FRSC: commanded the regiment during the Fenian Raids and the North-West Rebellion
- Lieutenant Colonel Frederick Charles Denison, CMG: Commanded the Canadian Voyageurs on the 1884 Nile Expedition
- Lieutenant Colonel William Hamilton Merritt III: served in the North-West Rebellion and the Boer War
- Brigadier General James H. Elmsley, CB CMG DSO
- Colonel John Everett Lyle Streight, MC

== See also ==
- List of regiments of cavalry of the Canadian Militia (1900–1920)
