= John Denison (Upper Canada) =

- Born: November 20, 1755; Yorkshire
- Died: October 28, 1824 (aged 68); York, Upper Canada
- Occupations: miller, brewer, land speculator
- Known for: member of Upper Canada's Family Compact
- Spouse: Sophia
- Children: George Taylor Denison; Thomas Denison; Charles Denison

John Denison was an early settler of Upper Canada. He was a militia officer and became a member of Upper Canada's notorious Family Compact. Through the friendship between his family and Peter Russell (a senior administrator of the new province) and his sister Elizabeth Russell, Denison and his family became one of the province's richest.

Denison's wife, the former Sophia Taylor, had been a childhood friend with Elizabeth. When Simcoe learned he would be appointed Lieutenant Governor, he lined up individuals to accompany him, who would be appointed to positions of influence. They would, in effect, fill a role similar to that of the landed gentry in English counties - this was the family compact. Simcoe had picked Russell, who, in turn, encouraged Denison to join them.

Denison, his wife and three sons arrived in Kingston, Ontario in 1792. He advertised an invitation for farmers to cultivate barley the same year and used that barley to open a brewery the following year.

At 57, he led a militia company during the War of 1812, with his three sons serving under him.

A dozen years near the top of the provincial administration had made Russell the largest landowner in the province. He was also a slave owner. His sister Elizabeth became the province's largest landowner, when she inherited his property on his death in 1808. She gave Amy Pompadour to her friend Sophia. Pompadour has been described as the last slave in the province. Denison family tradition states they later freed her.
