= George Taylor Denison III =

Canadian politician (1839–1925)

George Taylor Denison III FRSC
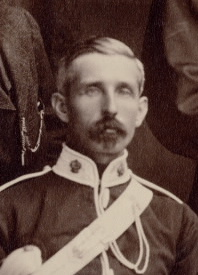
- George Taylor Denison III in 1877

President of the Royal Society of Canada
- In office 1903–1904
- Preceded by: James Alexander Grant
- Succeeded by: Benjamin Sulte

Personal details
- Born: 31 August 1839 Toronto, Upper Canada
- Died: 6 June 1925 (aged 85) Toronto, Ontario
- Resting place: St. John's Cemetery on the Humber, Weston, Ontario
- Parent: George Taylor Denison II (father)
- Relatives: George Taylor Denison (grandfather); Frederick Charles Denison (brother); John Denison (brother)

Lieutenant-Colonel George Taylor Denison III, FRSC (31 August 1839 – 6 June 1925) was a Canadian lawyer, military officer and writer.

== Life and career ==
George Taylor Denison III was born in Toronto to Colonel George Taylor Denison II, and educated at Upper Canada College. In 1861, he was called to the bar, and was from 1865 to 1867 a member of the city council. From the first, he took a prominent part in the organization of the military forces of Canada, joining the 1st Volunteer Militia Troop of Cavalry of York County (later The Governor General’s Body Guard) as a cornet in 1854 eventually becoming a lieutenant-colonel in the active militia in 1866. He saw active service during the Fenian raids of 1866, and during the North-West Rebellion of 1885.

Owing to his dissatisfaction with the conduct of the Conservative ministry during the Red River Rebellion in 1869-70, he abandoned that party, and in 1872 unsuccessfully contested Algoma in the Liberal interest. Thereafter, he remained free from party ties. In 1877, he was appointed police magistrate of Toronto.

Denison was one of the founders of the Canada First movement, which did much to shape the national aspirations from 1870 to 1878, and was a consistent supporter of imperial federation and of preferential trade between Great Britain and her colonies. He became a member of the Royal Society of Canada, and was president of the section dealing with English history and literature. The best known of his military works is his History of Modern Cavalry (London, 1877), which was awarded the Czar of Russia Prize in an open competition in 1879, and has been translated into German, Russian and Japanese. It remains one of the definitive works on the subject. In 1900 he published his reminiscences under the title of Soldiering in Canada.

He was a public defender of Upper Canada College, and was also known for virulent Anti-Americanism; after a proposal was made to erect a statue of George Washington in Westminster Abbey, he threatened that if it were built, he would go there to spit on it. Following the attempts by the Fenian raiders to "liberate" Canada between 1866 and 1871, Denison claimed a Yankee sword from the battlefield for a poker on his fire.

Denison died in Toronto in 1925 and was buried at a family plot in St. John's Cemetery on the Humber in Weston, Ontario.

== Confederate sympathizer ==
Denison was an enthusiastic supporter of the Confederate cause at the time of the American Civil War. As Norman Knowles argues in the Dictionary of Canadian Biography, Denison’s "identification with the South came naturally: it represented an idyllic society that embodied the social order, conservative values, and chivalric traditions he wished to see maintained in British North America. He drew parallels between his loyalist ancestors, who had fought to uphold their principles against the demagoguery of American patriots, and the southerners, who were struggling to preserve their identity and way of life."

== Works ==
- Manual of Outpost Duties, (1866)
- The Fenian Raid on Fort Erie, (1866)
- Modern Cavalry, (1868)
- History of Cavalry, (1877)
- Soldiering in Canada: Recollections and Experiences..., (1901)
- The Struggle for Imperial Unity, (1909)
- Recollections of a Police Magistrate, (1920)

== Denison family ==
- Captain John Denison (November 20, 1755 in Hedon, Yorkshire, England - October 28, 1824 in York, Upper Canada), great-grandfather of Denison III
  - Captain George Taylor Denison I (1783-1853), grandfather of Denison III and British militia soldier in the War of 1812
    - Colonel George Taylor Denison II (1816-1873), father of Denison III and Canadian militia commander (Denison's Horse)
      - Lieutenant-Colonel George Taylor Denison III, FRSC (1839-1925)
      - Lieutenant-Colonel Frederick Charles Denison, CMG (1846-1896), Canadian Member of Parliament (Conservative), 1846-1896
      - Henry Tyrwhitt Denison (1849-1929)
      - Clarence Alfred Kinsey Denison (1851-1932)
      - Rear Admiral John Denison, DSO (1853-1939), Royal Navy officer and aide-de-camp to King Edward VII, 1853-1939
        - Captain Bertram Denison, veteran of the Boer War, first casualty from Toronto during WWI, died 1914-09-25
      - Brigadier General Septimus Julius Augustus Denison, British Army officer, 1859-1937
      - Egerton Edmund Augustus Denison (1860-1886)
  - Captain Thomas John Denison (November 1, 1786 in Dovercourt, England - August 23, 1846 in York, Upper Canada), great-grand-uncle of Denison III
  - Charles Denison (1789 in Dovercourt, England - 1828 in York, Upper Canada), great-grand-uncle of Denison III
  - John Denison (1796-1826), great-grand-uncle of Denison III
  - Elizabeth Denison (1800-1801), great-grand-aunt of Denison III
  - Elizabeth Sophia Denison (1803-1892), great-grand-aunt of Denison III

Source: Toronto Star and

== See also ==
- Denison Armoury

Professional and academic associations
Preceded by James Alexander Grant	President of the Royal Society of Canada; 1903–1904	Succeeded by Benjamin Sulte
