= John Button (soldier) =

American-Canadian soldier (1772–1861)

Major John Button (May 18, 1772 – November 9, 1861) was an American-born Upper Canada settler (founder of Buttonville, Ontario), sedentary Canadian militia officer and founder of the 1st York Light Dragoons (also as Troop of Markham Dragoons or Captain Button's Dragoons).

== Early years ==
Button was born in New London, Connecticut to Joseph Button and Mary Ann Atwell. He was the fourth generation of Buttons in America (the first ancestor is believed to be Matthias Button (1610–1672), who arrived in the Boston, Massachusetts Bay Colony around 1633).

In 1790 John Button was working as a cooper and married Elizabeth Williams (1772–1847) in Dutchess County, New York in 1795. With the end of the American Revolution and not being an active United Empire Loyalist, Button would not begin the process of migrating north to Canada until the ratification of the Jay Treaty in 1795. In 1798 he petitioned the then President of the Executive Council and Administrator of Upper Canada Peter Russell for land in Upper Canada. Not waiting for the approval of his request his family settled in at Crowland Township (in now Welland, Ontario) in the Niagara Region (with family members already residents in the township) from 1799 to 1801. Once the grant was approved in 1801 (by Peter Hunter) they settled on 200 acres (81 ha) of land along Yonge Street (somewhere north of Bloor Street as Park lots ran north–south direction south of Bloor) in York, Upper Canada. He later sold this grant, moved north to Markham in 1803 and obtained 200 acres (81 ha) around the area now known as Buttonville, Ontario around 1805.

== Military career ==
Button joined the local militia in 1808 as a Lieutenant with the North York Regiment of Militia and established his cavalry troop, Light Dragoons, in 1810. Despite the end of the War of 1812, Button saw the need to maintain military alertness and requested to maintain his troop's readiness. Button was promoted as Major in 1831, had participated in the Battle of Detroit during the War of 1812 and later in the Rebellion of 1837 where he saw action at the Battle of Montgomery's Tavern.

== Community Leader and breeder ==
Besides his military contributions, Button help secure land for a church (he was a Wesleyan Methodist) in Buttonville. He would later establish a post office in the community that bore his name.

Button was a farmer and bred colts in his early years in Upper Canada and after the 1837 Rebellion.

== Later Years and Death ==
Button began selling off his land holdings in the latter part of his life (1840s) which led to the establishment of Buttonville in 1851. John Button died on November 9, 1861, predeceased by wife Elizabeth, son Newbury (1798–1823). He married Elizabeth Bradley in 1848. His son Colonel Francis Button (1794–1880) and grandson William Marr Button (1816–1908) would become members of his Light Dragoon. His troop is now part of The Governor General's Body Guard. Button and many members of his family are buried at Buttonville Cemetery.

William Marr Button would become reeve of Markham.

== Legacy ==
There are a few places that honour Button in Markham:

Buttonville, Ontario was established as a post office by Button and friend William Morrison with the name provided by Morrison.

Buttonville Airport is only land originally owned by Button and named in reference to the community of Buttonville.

Major Button Drive is a small residential street in newer section of Markham Village near Highway 7 and Ninth Line. Button had land near Markham Village on lot 8 of 8th Concession (Markham Road) in 1805. John Button Boulevard is another residential street near Woodbine Avenue (or 4th Concession where Button had obtained land grants) and 16th Avenue closer to the area where Button had settled with two connecting roadways, Captain Francis Drive and Colonel Marr Road, are named for his sons and grandson respectively.

John Button Waterway North and South are two tracts of greenspace along Apple Creek near Buttonville. Nearby also is John Button Park, a city park bearing Button's name.

Buttonville Crescent / Buttonville Street is a short residential street off Woodbine Avenue and located within what was John Button's Markham grant.

Buttonville Public School (c. 1992) and the 1872 Buttonville Schoolhouse are named for the community that is linked to his name.
