= Henry Coare Kingsford =

Royal Navy Admiral (1858–1941)

Admiral Henry Coare Kingsford
- Born: 7 January 1858
- Died: 1 March 1941 (aged 83)
- Military career
- Allegiance: United Kingdom
- Branch: Royal Navy
- Rank: Admiral
- Commands: HMS Goliath; Pembroke Dockyard

Admiral Henry Coare Kingsford (7 January 1858 – 1 March 1941) was a Royal Navy officer.

== Naval career ==
Kingsford joined the Royal Navy, and was promoted to the rank of lieutenant on 23 June 1890.

He was promoted to commander on 1 January 1894, and was the head of the Victorian Naval Forces from later that year. Promoted to captain on 30 June 1899, he was in command of the protected cruiser HMS Furious from March 1902 to February 1903, and from 23 April 1903 was in command of the protected cruiser HMS Hermes. He was in command of the battleship HMS Goliath from May 1905 to November 1906, when he was appointed Captain-Superintendent, Pembroke Dockyard, serving as such for two years.

He was promoted to rear-admiral on 5 November 1908, and retired from the navy, at his own request, on 7 March 1912. He was advanced to the rank of vice-admiral on the retired list on 10 February 1914, and to admiral on the retired list on 2 July 1917.

Military offices
Preceded by Captain John Denison	Captain-Superintendent, Pembroke Dockyard; 1906–1908	Succeeded by Captain Godfrey Harry Brydges Mundy
