= Alexander Johnson (mathematician) =

Irish mathematician and academic

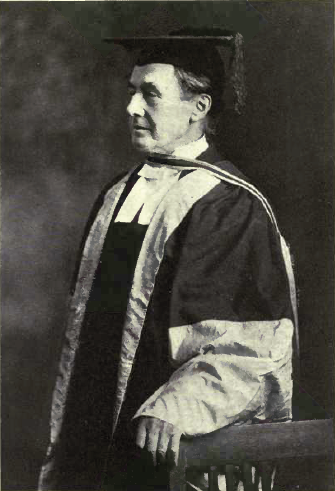
- Born: August 1, 1830; Ireland
- Died: February 11, 1912 (aged 81); Ottawa, Ontario, Canada

Alexander Johnson (August 1, 1830 – February 11, 1912) was an Irish mathematician and academic.

Born in Ireland, Johnson was educated at Trinity College, Dublin (TCD) where he was a scholar in 1852 and received his B.A. in mathematics (with Gold Medal) in 1855. TCD later awarded him M.A. (1858) and LL.D. (1861). In 1857, he had emigrated to Canada and was appointed a professor of mathematics and natural philosophy at McGill University. He was Dean of the faculty of arts and a vice-principal from 1886 to 1903.

He received an honorary DCL from the University of Bishop's College, Lennoxville in 1882. He was an original member of the Royal Society of Canada and was made a fellow. He was president of mathematics, physics and chemistry, and of the whole Society from 1905 to 1906.

Professional and academic associations
Preceded by Benjamin Sulte	President of the Royal Society of Canada; 1905–1906	Succeeded by William Saunders
