= George Taylor Denison II =

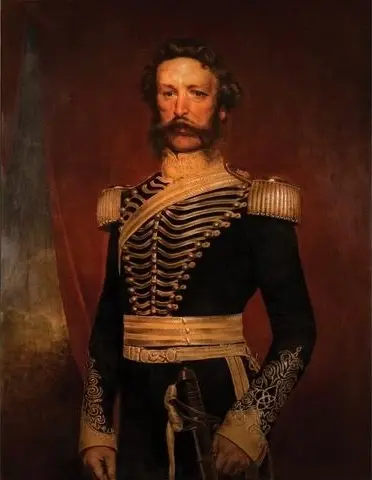
- Born: July 17, 1816; York, Upper Canada
- Died: May 30, 1873 (aged 56); Toronto, Ontario
- Resting place: St. John's Cemetery on the Humber, Weston, Ontario
- Occupations: Lawyer, military officer
- Children: George Taylor Denison III; Frederick Charles Denison; John Denison
- Father: George Taylor Denison

Colonel George Taylor Denison II (July 17, 1816 – May 30, 1873) was a Canadian lawyer and military officer.

== Life and career ==
He was a scion of what would later be called the Family Compact, the closely associated group of insiders in Upper Canada from which colonial Lieutenant Governors picked those to appoint to political appointments and sinecures. His grandfather John Denison was a good friend of Peter Russell, the acting Lieutenant Governor. His grandfather, and father George Taylor Denison, acquired substantial wealth in real estate.

He articled under George Cartwright Strachan, another member of the Family Compact, and was admitted to the bar in 1834.

His father distinguished himself during the War of 1812 and, in 1822, founded the York Dragoons, a cavalry militia unit, which he paid for out of his own funds. George Taylor Denison II would later command this unit, following his father's example, and paying its expenses out of his own funds.

Denison served as a Toronto alderman from 1843 to 1853. Denison and several other aldermen resigned to protest what they regarded as corruption on the part of the mayor at that time, John G. Bowes.

== See also ==
- Denison Armoury
