= Eliza Maria Harvey =

Canadian dairy farmer

Eliza Maria Harvey Jones
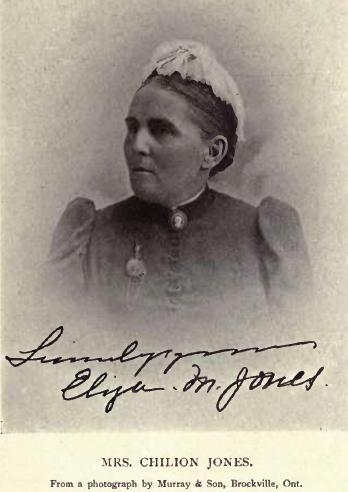
- Born: December 24, 1838; Maitland, Upper Canada
- Died: April 6, 1903 (aged 64); Gananoque, Ontario
- Occupation: Dairy Farmer
- Spouse: Chilion Jones

Eliza Maria Harvey Jones (born Eliza Maria Harvey; December 24, 1838 – April 6, 1903) was a Canadian farmer, butter producer and writer at one time described as the "best known dairywoman on the continent".

== Biography ==
Harvey was born in Maitland, Upper Canada, to miller Robert Harvey and Sarah Glassford. She was educated in Montreal and Scotland. She returned to the family farm following the death of her mother.

In 1859, she married Chilion Jones, the son of Jonas Jones, in Brockville; the couple had seven children. Shortly after their marriage, they moved to Ottawa where her husband, an architect, worked on the construction of the Parliament buildings. At the completion of that project, they returned to Brockville. Harvey operated a small dairy operation there. She began raising purebred Jersey cattle and established a large herd which she carefully managed. Taking advantage of the rich milk produced by these cattle, she began producing high quality butter which she was able to sell at a premium price in Canada and the United States. Her Canadian customers included the Rideau Club in Ottawa and the Canadian Pacific Railway.

During the 1880s, she began showing her cattle at exhibitions in Ontario, Quebec and New York, collecting many prizes for her animals. She sold her cattle to buyers across North America, including the Ontario Agricultural College in Guelph. She was a regular contributor of articles on farming to various periodicals including the Farmer's Advocate and Home Magazine and the Family Herald and Weekly Star in Montreal. In 1892, she published a collection of her columns as Dairying for profit: or, the poor man’s cow, which she dedicated to the farmer's wives of America. The Farmer's Advocate advertised it as "the best book ever written". A French version called Laiterie payante: ou, la vache du pauvre was published in 1894. In 1893, she published a pamphlet called Lecture on co-operative dairying and winter dairying.

In 1896, she sold half of her herd to a farmer in Prince Edward Island but continued to raise some cattle for her family's use. She also began to raise horses for racing or pulling carriages and wrote short stories for publication in the Farmer's Advocate.

In the fall of 1902, Harvey travelled to Gananoque where her husband had taken ill. She became ill herself and died there at the age of 64.

One of Eliza's sons was millionaire Canadian industrialist Frank P. Jones, who established the Eliza M. Jones Scholarships at McGill University in honour of his mother's memory.
