= Elizabeth Russell (Upper Canada) =

British diarist (1754–1823)

- Born: December 26, 1754; Gibraltar
- Died: February 19, 1822 (aged 67); Toronto, Upper Canada (now Ontario)
- Known for: Being a notable diarist

Elizabeth Russell (1754–1823) was a Gibraltar-born English diarist who settled in Upper Canada with her half-brother, Peter Russell (the Province's first receiver general).

== Early life ==
Russell was born into a disrupted family. Her father, Richard Russell, was cashiered over a scandal, and, according to the Dictionary of Canadian Biography, the stress drove her mother "violently insane". While her father was able to secure employment with the Royal Navy in Harwich, the Dictionary reported "Elizabeth grew up with little education, in an atmosphere darkened by her mother’s insanity and her father’s debts, extravagance, ill health, and lawsuits."

=== Half-brother Peter ===
Elizabeth’s father was alienated from her much older half-brother Peter, so she did not meet him until she was 17 years old, and he was 38. Russell cared for her elderly parents until her father died in 1786, when she moved in with Peter, at 31 years old. Neither ever married. The Dictionary of Canadian Biography suggestively described them as a "devoted couple for the rest of their lives."

In 1791, Peter was appointed Receiver General of Upper Canada. When his superior John Graves Simcoe fell ill, Russell was appointed the temporary administrator of Upper Canada, his title "President", while Simcoe returned to England. Peter had hoped to be appointed Simcoe's replacement, but he continued to be merely the administrator for three years. Peter continued to be part of the Provincial administration when Peter Hunter was appointed the second lieutenant governor in 1799.

While Peter's role in the Provincial administration became less prominent, he had acquired ownership of 45,000 acres (18,000 hectares), making him wealthy, at least on paper. He would have liked to have liquidated his landholdings, and retired to England as he became older and his health failed, but there was little market for property in an era when the Crown was granting free land to anyone deemed worthy.

Peter died in 1808. He left his entire estate to Elizabeth.

== Slave ownership ==
Peter and Elizabeth were slave owners, owning Peggy Pompadour, and her children Amy (who would later be described as the last slave in the province), Milly and Jupiter. It is not known when they purchased Peggy and her children, but most likely from Loyalists while living in Niagara during the first years of the Upper Canadian government. Simcoe's Act Against Slavery prohibited importing new slaves; it did not affect the slavery of individuals in captivity from prior to its imposition. They tried, several times, to sell the Pompadour family, due to their troubled relations with them, without success. Amy is said to have been given to John Denison's wife or daughter.

== Ill health ==
According to the Dictionary of Canadian Biography, after Peter's death, Elizabeth relied on the family of Dr. William Warren Baldwin. She found the War of 1812 troubling, and she began to show signs of mental instability. By 1814, members of the Baldwin family moved in with her, to help care for her.

She would leave her considerable estate to her cousins Maria Willcocks (spinster) and Phoebe Willcocks, wife of Dr. Baldwin. After Maria's death the entire estate ended up in Baldwin's control, and eventually in the hands of his heirs.

In Fall 2018 Afua Cooper published excerpts from Russell's diary, in which she described Peggy and her children.
