= Chilion Jones =

Canadian architect

- Born: October 10, 1835; Brockville, Upper Canada
- Died: April 1, 1912 (aged 76); Bermuda
- Occupation: Architect
- Buildings: Parliament Buildings

Chilion Jones (October 10, 1835– April 1, 1912) was the business partner of architect Thomas Fuller in nineteenth-century Canada.

Chilion Jones, the sixth son of Mr. Justice Jonas Jones, of Toronto, Ontario, was born in Brockville, Upper Canada. By 1857, he had moved to Toronto and formed a partnership with civil engineer Robert Messer. He formed a partnership with Thomas Fuller in the 1850s, together winning the contracts to design the Church of St. Stephen-in-the-Fields in Toronto and the neo-gothic Parliament Buildings in Ottawa. In 1863, Jones returned to Brockville, where he became a tavern keeper. He was later involved in the construction of the Carillon Canal and also worked on projects in the Toronto harbour area. He was president of the Spring & Axle Company and the D.F. Jones Manufacturing Co. in Gananoque, Ontario.

Jones suffered from gout for the last twenty years of his life. He died in Bermuda in 1912 while recuperating there.

== Family ==
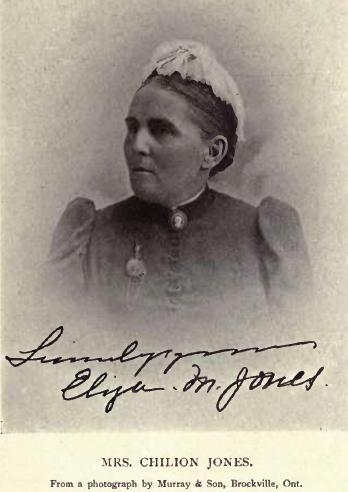
Mrs Eliza Maria Jones (née Harvey) by Murray & Son, Brockville, Ont

Chilion Jones married Eliza Maria Harvey, daughter of Robert Harvey, of Maitland, Ont. in 1859. She was born in Maitland, Ontario, and educated in Scotland. She was a stock-raiser of a herd of Jersey cattle and was the author of a book, "Dairying for Profit." Her herd of Jersey cattle won gold, silver and bronze prizes at exhibitions in Canada, and won silver cups and silver services at exhibitions in the United States. She was also a horse-breeder of a stable of racers and carriage horses which were sold in the U.S. and Canada. She died at Gananoque, April 6, 1903.

The couple had two sons and three daughters. One daughter, Elsie Jones, was a noted horsewoman.

== External ==
- Canada by Design: Parliament Hill, Ottawa at Library and Archives Canada
- Historic Places of Canada
