= HMY Victoria and Albert (1855) =

1855 royal yacht

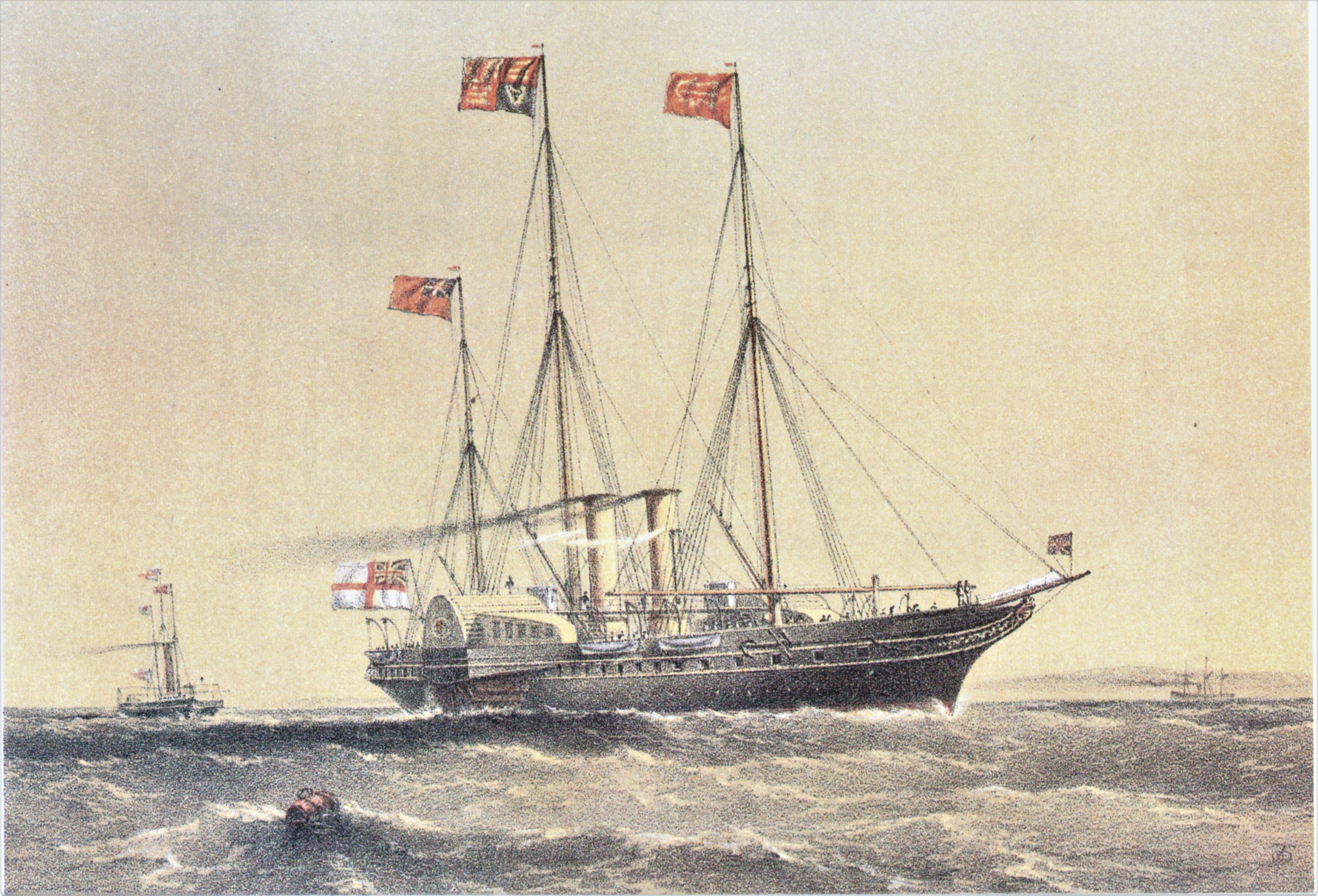
- A painting of HMY Victoria and Albert by William Frederick Mitchell

History

United Kingdom
- Name: Victoria and Albert
- Namesake: Queen Victoria and Albert, Prince Consort
- Launched: 16 January 1855
- Fate: Scrapped, circa 1904

General characteristics
- Type: Royal yacht
- Displacement: 2,390 long tons (2,430 t) when deep
- Length: 360 ft (110 m)
- Beam: 40 ft (12 m)
- Installed power: 2,400 ihp (1,800 kW)
- Propulsion: Steam engine; Twin paddles
- Speed: 15 knots (28 km/h; 17 mph)
- Complement: 240

HMY Victoria and Albert, a 360-foot (110 m) steamer launched on 16 January 1855, was a royal yacht of the sovereign of the United Kingdom until 1900, owned and operated by the Royal Navy. She displaced 2,390 tons, and could make 15 knots (28 km/h; 17 mph) on her paddles. There were 240 crew.

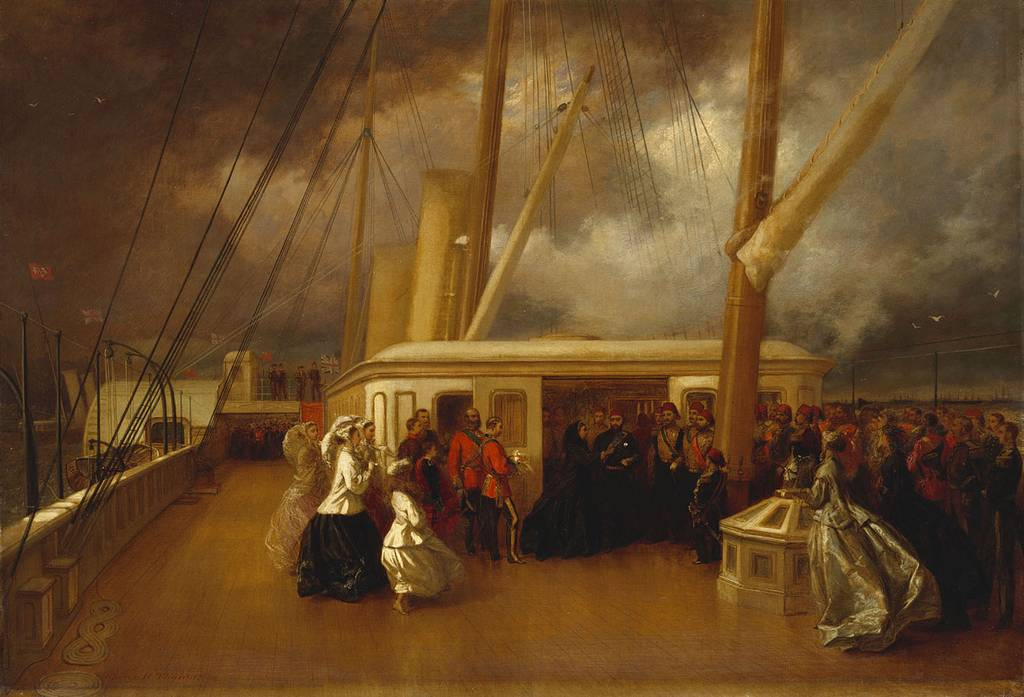
Victoria Queen of the United Kingdom of Great Britain and Ireland and Abdulaziz, emperor of the Ottoman Empire, on the Royal yacht during the Sultan's official visit, 1867, by George Housman Thomas, depicting the Sultan's official visit to United Kingdom.

== Career ==
She was built by O. Lang at Pembroke Dock.

Queen Victoria made her first cruise in her on 12 July 1855. On 3 June 1859, Victoria and Albert ran aground in the Scheldt whilst on a voyage from Gravesend, Kent to Antwerp, Belgium.

Queen Victoria lent the ship to Empress Elisabeth of Austria for her cruise to Madeira in 1860.

In March 1863 she brought Princess Alexandra for her wedding to Prince Albert.

The ship was used by Prince Arthur on the occasion of his visit to Heligoland in 1872.

Queen Victoria sent the ship to Vlissingen to ferry Crown Prince Friedrich Wilhelm of Germany accompanied by his wife Victoria, their three youngest daughters, Carl Jakob Adolf Christian Gerhardt, two court officials and two ladies-in-waiting across the Channel to be treated of his throat illness in England by Morell Mackenzie. They alighted in Sheerness on 15 June 1887.

Victoria and Albert was replaced by HMY Victoria and Albert (1899) in 1901 and scrapped around 1904.

El Mahrousa was built to the same specifications for Isma'il Pasha, the Khedive of Egypt in 1865 and survives today, although heavily altered.

== Notable commanding officers ==
- John Fullerton, appointed 1884
- John Denison, appointed 1893

== Bow decoration ==
The bow decoration of HMY Victoria and Albert features the royal arms instead of being a traditional animal or person figurehead; a shield bearing arms was the most popular choice for royal yachts. It incorporates the arms of both Queen Victoria and Prince Albert. The arms are enclosed in an ornate scroll design, decorated with a rose, shamrock and thistle in recognition of England, Ireland and Scotland.

The decoration is part of the collection of the National Museum of the Royal Navy, Portsmouth.
