= St. Stephen-in-the-Fields Anglican Church =

Church of St. Stephen-in-the-Fields
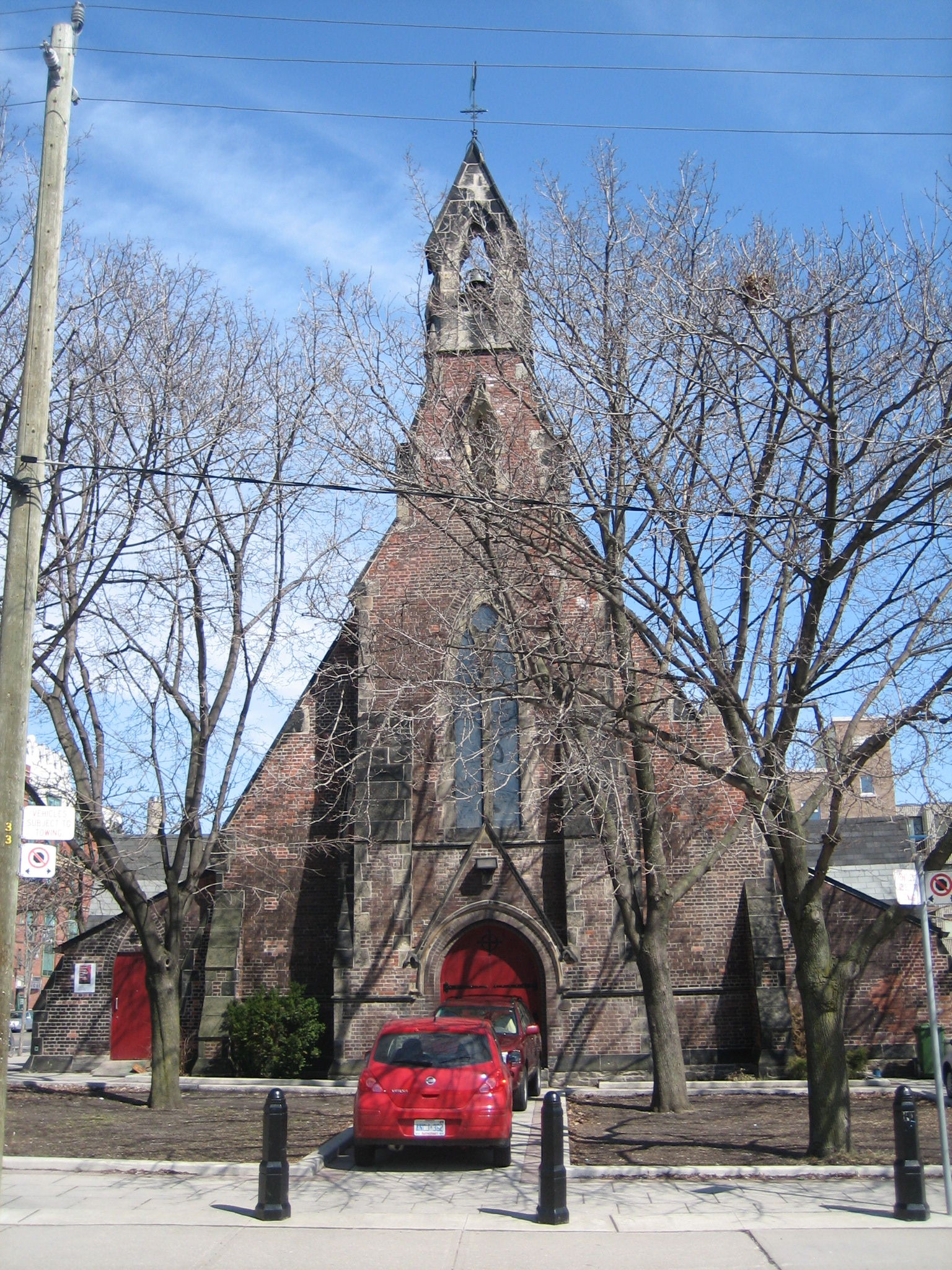
- The church in June 2009
- Church of St. Stephen-in-the-Fields
- 43.6569433°N 79.4043153°W
- Location: 103 Bellevue Avenue; Toronto, Ontario, Canada
- Denomination: Anglican Church of Canada
- Website: saintstephens.ca

History
- Founded: 1857
- Founder: Robert Brittain Denison
- Dedication: St. Stephen

Architecture
- Architect(s): Fuller & Jones
- Style: Gothic Revival
- Years built: 1858

Administration
- Province: Ontario
- Diocese: Toronto
- Deanery: Parkdale

Clergy
- Rector: Maggie Helwig

Ontario Heritage Act
- Type: Municipally designated
- Designated: June 20, 1977
- By-law No.: 380-77

St. Stephen-in-the-Fields Anglican Church is an Anglican Church of Canada parish church in the Kensington Market neighbourhood of Toronto, Ontario. It was the first Anglican church established in the city west of Spadina Avenue. St. Stephen's is known for a number of community outreach programs.

Designed by Thomas Fuller, later Chief Dominion Architect, in the Gothic Revival style, the church is designed under Part IV of the Ontario Heritage Act as being of significant cultural heritage value.

== History ==
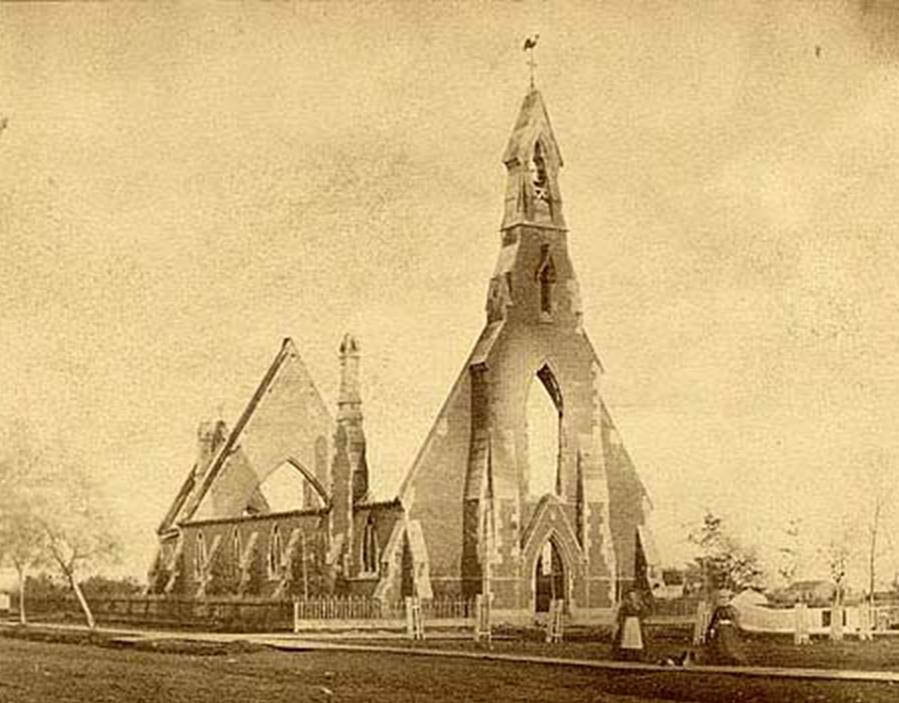
The church after the 1865 fire

St. Stephen-in-the-Fields was founded in 1857 by Robert Brittain Denison. Denison, who paid for its construction in entirety, built the church as a parish for the farm workers on his estate, Bellevue House. Ground was broken on July 1, 1858, when the Hon. and Rt Rev. John Strachan, 1st Bishop of Toronto, laid the cornerstone. The church's name reflects its then rural setting. Denison employed the architectural firm of Fuller & Jones, who would later go on to design the Centre Block of Parliament Hill. John Worthington was the builder. The first service was held in the new church on Advent Sunday, November 28, 1858. The first incumbent was the Rev. James Henry McCollum, who later left after a feud with Denison. The church was consecrated on May 17, 1863, the Sunday after Ascension Day.

The church was gutted by fire on October 26, 1865. The congregation met in a lecture hall at University College while the church was rebuilt by Henry Langley. The church was expanded by Richard Cunningham Windeyer, Sr. in 1878 and renovated by Eden Smith in 1890.

In 1927, the rector, the Rev. James Edward Ward, pioneered broadcasting services on CFRB and VE9GW. It was the first Canadian church to broadcast across the ocean and gained a large international following. Ward also wrote 75 religious plays for radio, many in collaboration with Earle Grey. Ward also wrote a weekly religious programme titled "The Way of the Spirit" on CBC Radio.

In the 1980s, to raise necessary funds, the rectory, parish hall and surrounding property were sold and half the church was gutted and converted into a clinic for The Doctor’s Hospital. After the hospital vacated, the other half of the building has been rented out for community uses.

As one of the oldest Anglican churches in the city, the parish has been subdivided many times creating new parishes including St. Matthias, St. Thomas's and St. Mary Magdalene.

== Architecture ==
The original 1858 church was designed by Thomas Fuller, later Chief Dominion Architect, and Chilion Jones in the Gothic Revival style. The design was based on St Michael's Church, Longstanton. It is of red brick construction trimmed with grey stone. Fuller & Jones' church was gutted by fire in 1865 and rebuilt and enlarged by Henry Langley. None of Fuller's original interior survives, though on the exterior, the polychromatic masonry, solid buttressing and open bell cote survive. The current chancel dates from an 1890 renovation by Eden Smith.

The church is notable for its stained glass windows, some of which date from the 1860s. The windows were restored in 2018 at a cost of $80,000.

== List of rectors ==
- 1858 – 1861: The Rev. James Henry McCollum
- 1861 – 1911: The Rev. Abraham James Broughall
- 1912 – 1925: The Rev. Canon Thomas George Wallace
- 1925 – 1958: The Rev. James Edward Ward
- 1958 – 1968: The Rev. Canon Guy Marshall
- 1968 – 1972: The Rev. John E. Speers
- 1972 – 1982: The Rev. Campbell A. Russell
- 1982 – 1988: The Rev. Ben Lochridge
- 1988 – 2004: The Rev. Kevin Flynn
- 2015 – present: The Rev. Canon Maggie Helwig

From 2004 to 2014, the parish was served by four priests-in-charge: the Rev. David Neelands (2004–2005); the Rev. Christian Swayne OHC (2005–2011); the Rev. David Bryan Hoopes OHC (2011–2013); and the Rev. Maggie Helwig, who began as priest-in-charge in May 2013 and was appointed rector in January 2015.

== See also ==
- List of Anglican churches in Toronto
- Parkdale Deanery
