= Buttonville, Markham =

Buttonville
- Neighbourhood; Former hamlet
- Woodbine Avenue in the Buttonville hamlet
- Interactive map of Buttonville
- Coordinates: 43°51′40″N 79°21′40″W
- Country: Canada
- Province: Ontario
- Regional municipality: York
- City: Markham
- Founder: John Button
- Established: 1808 (hamlet)
- Changed division: 1971 York Region from York County
- Changed municipality: 1971 Markham Township into Markham (as Town); 2012 (as City)

Government
  - MP: Paul Chiang (Markham—Unionville)
  - MPP: Billy Pang (Markham—Unionville)
  - Councillors: Ritch Lau (Ward 2)
- Postal code: L3R

Buttonville is a suburban neighbourhood and former hamlet in the city of Markham, Ontario, Canada, bordering the larger Unionville district. The hamlet was named after its founder, John Button.

About 30,000 residents live in the area, which is located along the Woodbine Avenue corridor from approximately Highway 7 in the south to Sixteenth Avenue in the north, with the historic hamlet itself located roughly midway between the two arterials. The Rouge River flows through the northeast and Highway 404 (part of Markham's boundary with the City of Richmond Hill) passes to the west, with two interchanges. The residential area is located in the eastern, northeastern, and the northern sections, and the industrial area is to the west and the south down to Highway 7.

There is talk about renaming the community to "John Button Community", after its founder, since there has been confusion between Unionville and Buttonville, which is popularly considered to be part of Unionville.

== History ==
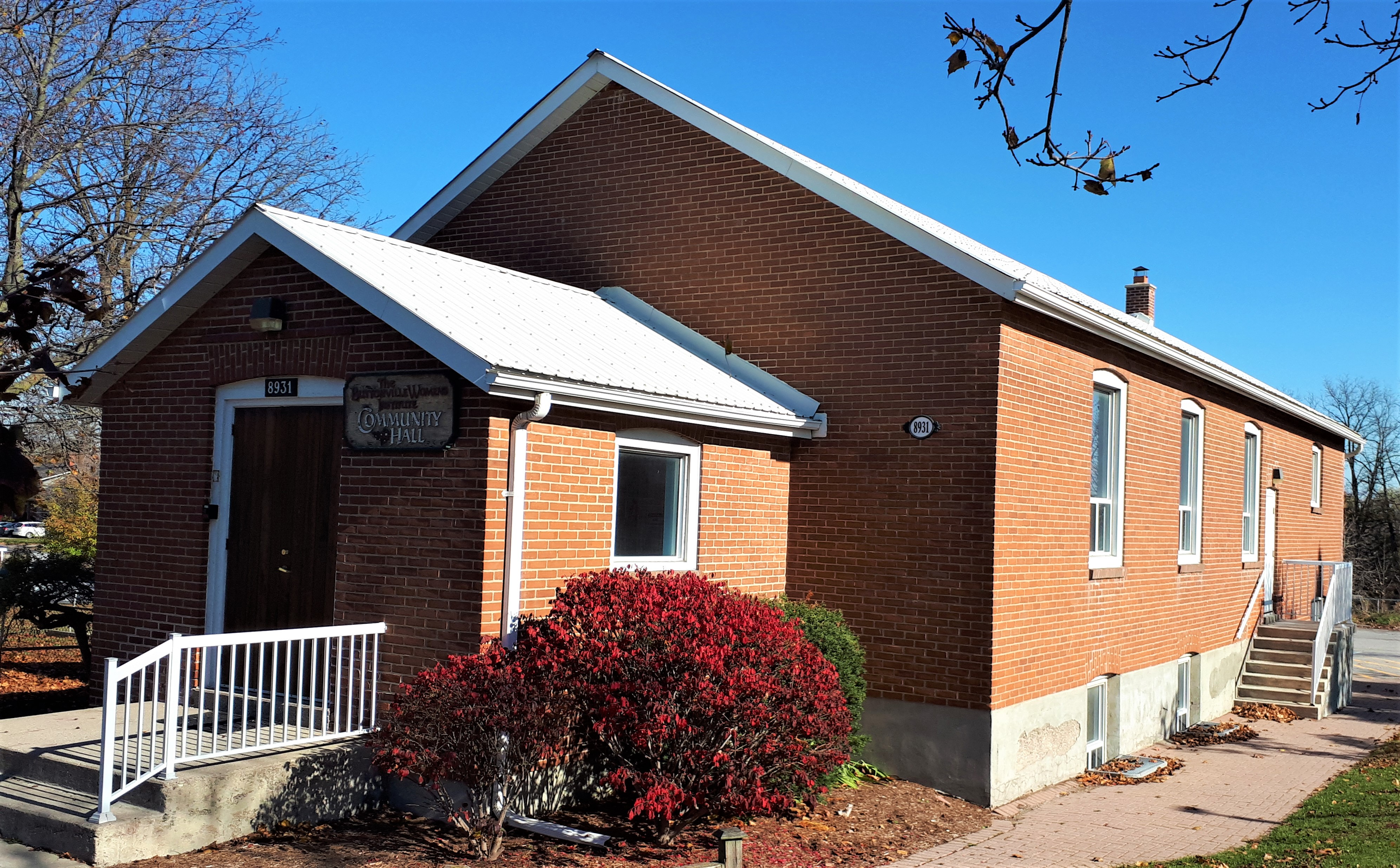
Buttonville Women's Institute Community Hall

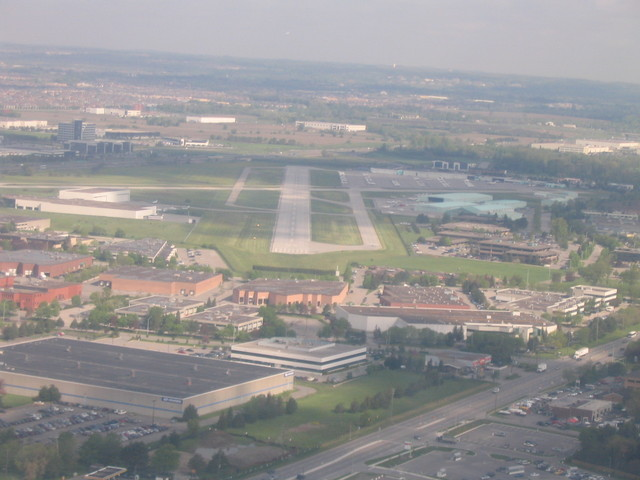
View of the former Buttonville Airport in 2006 from an aircraft on approach to land

The area was first settled by William Berczy, who got an original Crown grant of land. It was named after John Button (b. 1772), who bought property in Markham Township there in 1808. The area's name first appeared in 1851 when a post office was granted to John Button and William Morrison. The name was chosen instead of Millbrook, which had been unofficially used since 1834. John Button's descendants owned a number of lots in what is today Buttonville. By 1878 the village had a post office, a gristmill, a wagon maker, a school, a Lutheran church and a Methodist church. Buttonville Community Hall was relocated from L'Amoreaux in Scarborough from what was a Methodist chapel c. 1840s and closed in 1938.

Housing developments began to appear in the 1960s, as exurban estate residential near Cachet Woods at Woodbine Avenue and Major Mackenzie Drive, and the industrial area began to develop further south. In the 1980s, housing developments came to the western part of Markham along with the industries which later flowed with technological and financial companies including Allstate. Buttonville was first accessed, when Highway 404 opened several interchanges in the 1970s. That brought massive growth to the area, which had become built out by the mid-2000s.

=== Former airport ===
Buttonville Municipal Airport was located at 16th Avenue and Highway 404 and was a medium-sized general aviation airport that operated from 1953 to 2023. Weather data was collected there by Environment and Climate Change Canada, but closed along with the airport. The former airfield is planned to be redeveloped for residential and commercial uses.

== Transportation ==
One major highway and several arterial roads pass through or near the neighbourhood:

- Highway 404 runs north–south on the west side of and connected to east-south streets
- Highway 7 runs east–west on the south side.
- Sixteenth Avenue runs east–west on the north side.
- Woodbine Avenue runs north–south through its centre. The historic settlement itself is located along it south of Sixteenth Avenue.

Public transit in Buttonville is provided by:

- York Region Transit / Viva Rapid Transit routes Viva Purple, 1 Highway 7 (both serving Highway 7), 85 Rutherford-16th (Sixteenth), and 24 Woodbine (Woodbine) operate regular bus service.

== Nearby places ==
- East Beaver Creek (City of Richmond Hill), west
- Unionville, east
- Milliken, south
- Cachet, north

== Education ==
- Buttonville PS
- YRDSB Museum and Archives, housed in 1850 Buttonville Schoolhouse
