= Work and labour organization in Upper Canada =

The cultural and legal framework within which tradesmen (called "mechanics" in the period) contracted for work, and hired men was similar to that of Great Britain. These immigrants quickly sought to establish and regulate the basic institutions of the trades: Friendly societies, the house of call and apprenticeship. Friendly societies were worker controlled mutual insurance organizations. They provided an income in the case of strike, injury or economic downturn. Their association with specific trades also made them useful vehicles for trade union organization.

== The master-journeymen-apprentice system ==
Master tradesmen were the skilled workers who would contract to perform large building projects. They depended upon their apprentices, "tradesmen in training," and those apprentices who had graduated, the independent journeymen.

=== Apprenticeship ===
Apprenticeship was the means by which tradesmen acquired their skills and controlled access to their trade. It was a seven-year contract in which the master agreed to train the apprentice and frequently board him in his own home as well. The apprentice would be paid for part of their service, but at a much reduced rate compared to journeymen. Apprentices were indentured under the "Law of Master & Servant" and hence subject to significant penalties for breach of contract should they abandon their masters. Journeymen in contrast, were supposed to be independent subcontractors. As will be seen, their actual independence was constrained by the common practice of keeping them in debt. They couldn't change masters without the fear of losing their owed wages.

==== The Mechanics Institute ====
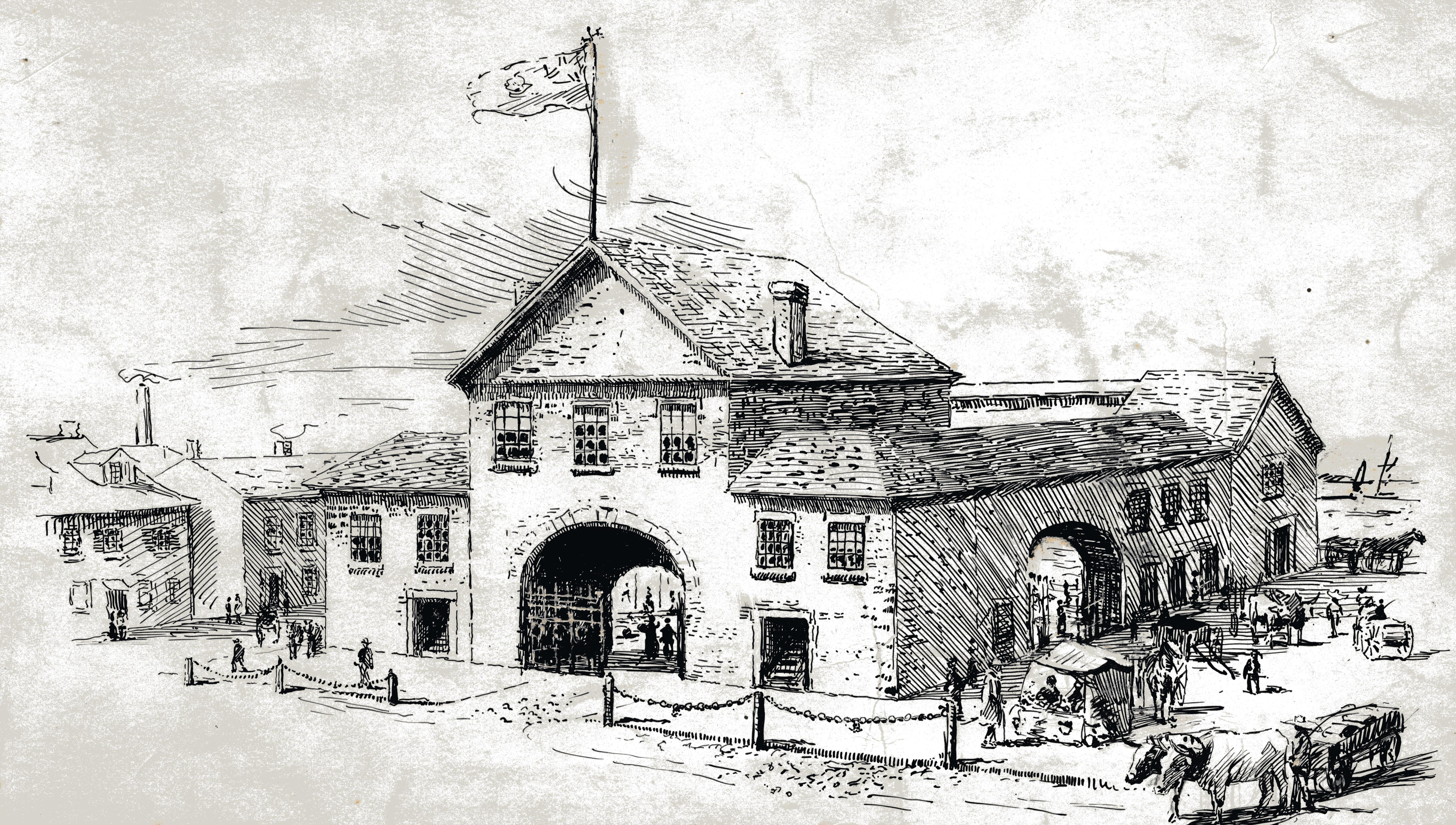
Second market in York (Toronto)

In 1830, Reform politicians John Lesslie and William Lyon Mackenzie helped form the York (later Toronto) Mechanics' Institute, based upon their experience with the "Dundee Rational Institute" in Scotland, and the London Mechanics Institute. This was an early attempt to provide more general working class education for apprentices. "Common schools" received little government support compared to the "grammar schools" that taught a classical education to the elite Family Compact bound for university. The Institute built up a lending library, and held weekly lectures. The Mechanics Institute was closely bound to the Reform movement, and shared quarters with their political organization, the Canadian Alliance Society, in the second market buildings. A Mechanics Institute was also started in Kingston.

=== Journeymen ===
After completing their apprenticeship, workers joined the ranks of journeymen. Like their bosses, the masters, they performed the same tasks and had the same terms of employment (on contracts). They differed from masters who were more stabile (having a shop) and willing to take on large contracts and to subcontract. Over time, as he gained skill and capital, a journeyman could begin to sub-contract larger projects and eventually take apprentices and become a master himself.

==== Friendly societies ====
Friendly Societies were democratically organized self-help community insurance organizations designed to alleviate tragedies arising from accident, sickness and old age. Regular contributions to a common fund entitled the society member to relief when sick or unemployed, providing that member an income in the face of calamity. Legislation had been passed in Britain in 1793 giving the Friendly Societies legal standing while confirming the illegality of other forms of popular organization. Their association with specific trades also made them useful vehicles for trade union organization, which was otherwise illegal under the Combination Act of 1799.

==== Houses of call ====
Friendly Societies representing specific trades would meet at taverns, their "house of call." Journeymen looking for work could register at these taverns, and masters looking for men could find them there. Journeymen were mobile, and could rarely count on long-term employment. Only apprentices were hired for any length of time, usually the period of their seven-year indenture to learn the trade.

==== Jobbing and tramping ====
Having served an apprenticeship, journeymen owned their own tools and could be hired by the task (piecework), by the "job," or by time. "Jobbing" was a form of sub-contracting, in which the worker provided not only his own tools, but also his own materials. Journeymen thus had a range of flexible employment options which entailed frequent short-term stints of work and equally frequent periods of "tramping" looking for jobs. When tramping, they might travel a circuit of towns visiting their Houses of Call. If they were members of a trade-based Friendly Society, they might appeal to its members for aid during these periods of unemployment.

== The trades and their unionization ==
Trade unions were illegal in Britain until 1825. Their legal standing in Upper Canada is uncertain. However, as the Owenite socialist movement in England and America gathered steam in 1834 they created Grand Trade Unions bringing tradesmen of many professions in one union in both continents. A similar movement took place in Upper Canada. A builders union emerged in 1834, followed by a typographers union shortly thereafter. By 1836, the tradesmen (called "mechanics" then) formed a petitioning organization, the "Mechanics Association," in order to further the political issues important to workers - the use of prison labour in particular.

=== Legal standing ===
In Britain, the "Combination Act" of 1799 made labour unions "criminal conspiracies," illegal until 1825, when the Act was finally repealed. Some have argued that the Combination Act never applied in Upper Canada; English criminal law applied in Upper Canada because the House of Assembly accepted all English criminal statutes as of 17 September 1792, seven years before the Combination Act was passed. However, other acts passed after the reception date were subsequently accepted as law. If the Combination Act was taken as received, its repeal in 1825 was a separate issue again. As the matter was never settled in the higher courts in this period we can only point to the general "indefinite area of toleration" for such combinations evidenced in the magistrates' manuals for Upper Canada. W.C. Keele's "The Provincial Justice, or Magistrate's Manual... compiled and inscribed by permission, to His Majesty's Attorney General" was published in 1835 and stated without qualification that any justice of the peace could have any striking worker jailed, its untested formal legality notwithstanding.

=== General contracting and the building trades ===
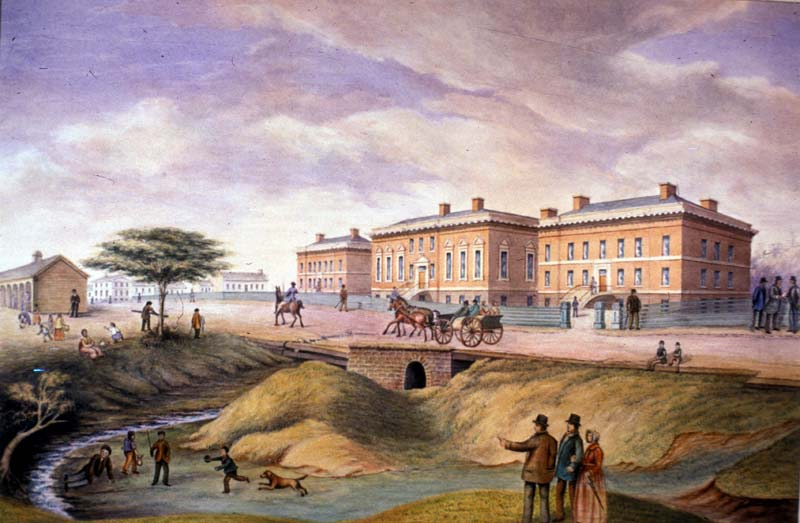
Third Parliament Buildings of Upper Canada (1834)

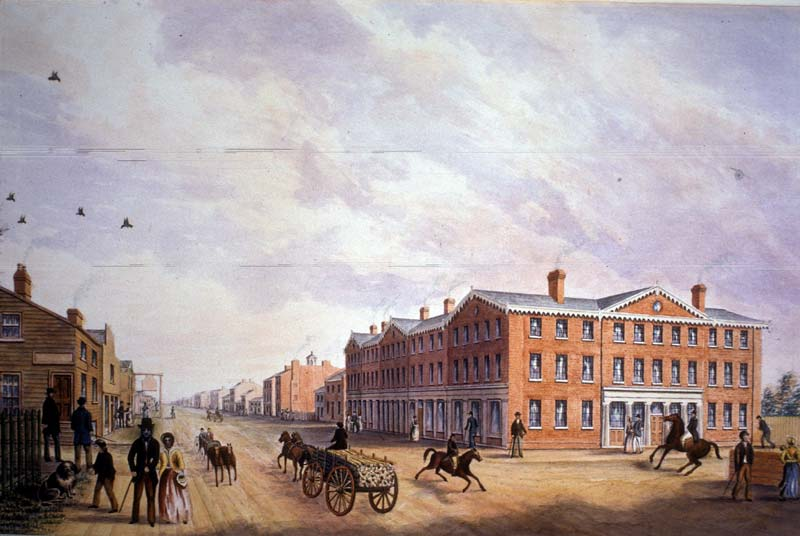
Chewett Building, designed And built by John George Howard

The drive to form labour unions in Upper Canada resulted from a fundamental change in the way building projects in Toronto were contracted. The change to general contracting happened first in government construction projects, then private ones, leading to labour strife.

General contracting was introduced in the building trades in the 1820s in Britain. General contracting reorganized the bidding process by which construction contracts were awarded, and in so doing, challenged the master-journeyman system. General contracting began in the British "Office of Public Works" during the Napoleonic Wars; they obtained competitive tenders for the whole project by a single builder at fixed cost for the first time. This was a means by which they could limit their liability for cost overruns. By 1825, the system became common in the northwest of England, resulting in a steep fall in wages. General contracting was introduced in Upper Canada in the construction of public works such as the new parliament buildings in Toronto, beginning in 1829. This placed the project in the hands of a single master builder who subcontracted portions of the project to the other trades. Rather than "job" the work to a subcontractor, the general contractor would provide his own building materials, hiring masters and their journeymen as labour only. By limiting "jobbing," the general contractors also eroded the traditional measures by which these jobs were costed. This gave the general contractor more profit, and the masters less.

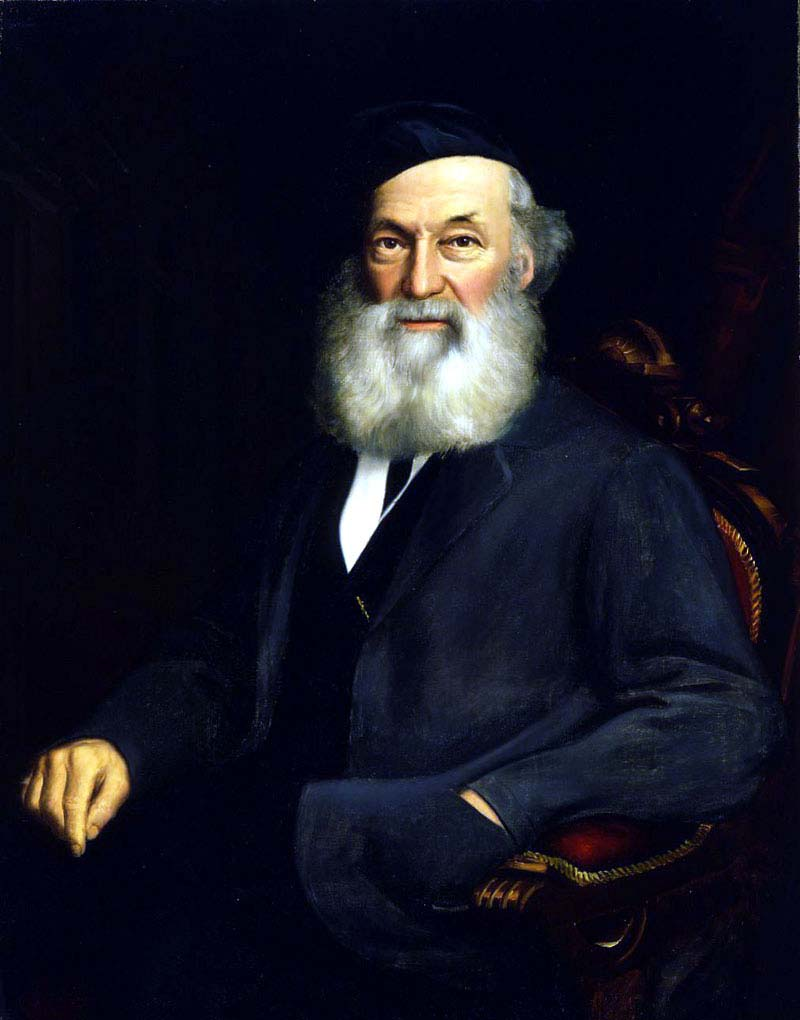
John George Howard, architect & general contractor

The general contractors had no interests in perpetuating the master-journeyman system and its traditional standards of payment, and abused the apprenticeship system by hiring unqualified workmen. General contracting was clearly an issue in Toronto as early as 1831 when the members of the United Amicable Trade and Benefit Society of Journeymen Bricklayers, Plasterers and Masons rejected the general contracting system.

The general contractors used debt to bind workers to them. Workers complained of "great delay in obtaining payment" in June 1833, when the friendly society of carpenters and joiners called on their employers "for more punctual payments than what we have had in time past." They demanded "$5 per week on account, and a settlement at the end of each month." According to an anonymous "Master Builder" (contractor), "they receive from 3 to 5 dollars per week, at an average; and a settlement when the employer gets in his money, or obtains installments upon his contracts, when the Journeymen are often paid from £5 to £20 of arrears."

Thomas Dalton, editor of the Patriot, retorted:

It is indeed incomprehensible, how laboring mechanics generally, can by possibility live in comfort, or decency, with arrears of wages due to them, to the amount of £20... However scarce money may be, and however long credit may be expected, it is very absurd to expect such credit from Journeymen who ordinarily can only supply their families from hand to mouth. It is the rich alone who can afford long credits... Is it just, to put the laborer in the predicament of being fleeced when his toil has actually won the fleece?

These workers could not easily change jobs when those general contractors owed them substantial back-wages.

The tension between general contractors and the building tradesmen came to a head in 1833 with the construction of Chewett's block by general contractor John George Howard. Chewett's building, was a "splendid block of lofty brick houses is erecting on King and York Streets, to comprise eight or ten tenements for stores or dwelling houses, with an extensive hotel at the corner... " Its designer and general contractor was a new British emigrant, John George Howard. Howard was to become one of Toronto's most famous architects and builders: besides Chewett's building, he built 4 large houses in Toronto the year he arrived and predicted he would build twenty of the one-hundred houses that would be built the next year.

Just before Christmas, the workers on Chewett's block went on strike after Howard refused to pay them their wages in full. The workers now refused to work for "any person whatever, other than a Master of their respective Trades, except it be direct for the Owner or Proprietor of Buildings." Howard's intermediary role as general contractor was clearly a point of contention. The striking workmen were up against the Family Compact. James G. Chewett was not only the deputy surveyor general of the province, but also a magistrate. Chewett, building owner and magistrate, had William Jarvis, sheriff of the Home District and elected representative for the city lay charges against the men. This is Toronto's first major strike. No court records survived of the case, but 6 weeks after they first struck for the payment of back wages they received £85.

This incident appears to have emboldened the masters and their journeymen to petition their member of the Legislative Assembly, Sheriff William Jarvis (the man who had arrested them for striking) to prepare for a "lien law somewhat similar to an act of that name now in force in New York, by which the wages of the workmen employed in buildings are very adequately protected." The law required the commissioner of a building to withhold labourers' wages from installment payments made to contractors, and to pay those labourers directly. The Assembly prepared a "Mechanics Protection Bill," but as William Lyon Mackenzie correctly predicted, "Nothing will be done on it this parliament. It may pass the next, if the legislative council be new modelled."

=== The Typographical Union ===
The city's 20 journeymen printers in the Typographical Union of Toronto struck in October 1836, for higher wages and a limit on the number of apprentices per shop.

== The Mechanics Association and prison labour ==
These craft-based friendly societies organized themselves as a "Mechanics Association" in 1836, with branches in Kingston, Toronto, and Dundas. It was first organized in Kingston in 1833 as a result of opposition to the use of convict labour in the new penitentiary. The artisans argued that convict produced goods would compete with their own, lowering prices, and impoverishing them. As the penitentiary neared completion in 1835, the mechanics of Kingston again petitioned the legislature. A similar public meeting was called in Toronto in March. By August 1836 they formed a Mechanics Association. Key to coordinating the associations were Charles Sewell, a Kingston watchmaker who moved to Toronto that year; and William Lesslie, a Kingston storekeeper in a family business with branches in Toronto and Dundas, who moved to Toronto in 1835. Sewell went on to become the secretary of the new association. In explaining the need for such an innovation, they stated

whilst all other classes have some methods of co-operation sufficient for their purpose, the Mechanical interest, for such purpose were wholly unrepresented: that the Commercial interest through their Board of Trade, and from the constant intercourse of the merchants in the Reading Room have immediate notice of any matter affecting their interests, which can be instantly attended to, and quietly remedied, without any person except themselves knowing of its existence - whereas the Mechanical interest in similar cases, have hitherto had no other method of making known their complaints, but by public meetings, generally an inefficient instrument for that purpose, and moreover cannot be resorted to very frequently, and not at all by those who may perhaps be the greatest sufferers (Courier, 17 August 1836).

The formation of a "political union" for the purpose of organizing petitions was the primary form of political activity of the era, and had resulted in the "Great Reform Act" of 1832 in Britain. The new Association was intended to politically represent the "mechanical interest" only – that is, masters and their journeymen – "either by petition to the Legislature, or to any other branch of Government, for any alteration or extension of duties, by inforcing the law against such as may violate it to their injury, by addresses to the public or its own members." As such it is similar to the National Union of the Working Classes (founded in 1831) in London, which was to instigate the Chartist movement in 1838, or the American Workingmen's party in New York.
