= Benjamin Sulte =

Canadian journalist, writer, civil servant and historian

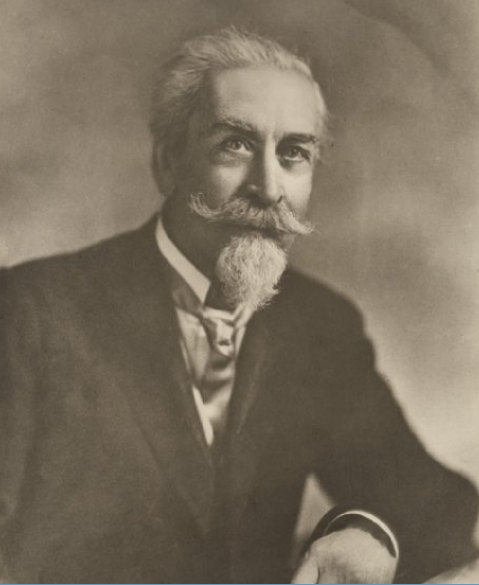
- Born: September 17, 1841; Trois-Rivières, Canada East
- Died: August 6, 1923 (aged 81); Ottawa, Ontario, Canada
- Title: President of the Royal Society of Canada
- Term: 1904–1905
- Predecessor: George Taylor Denison III
- Successor: Alexander Johnson

Benjamin Sulte (September 17, 1841 – August 6, 1923), baptized Olivier-Benjamin Vadeboncœur, was a Canadian journalist, writer, civil servant, and historian.

Born in Trois-Rivières, Lower Canada (now Quebec), to Benjamin Sulte dit Vadeboncœur, and Marie-Antoinette Lefebvre, Sulte had to leave school in 1851 as a consequence of the death of his father in 1847. He held a variety of jobs including working in a dry goods shop, as a clerk in a grocer's shop, as a bookkeeper for lumber merchants, as a paymaster on a steamship, and as an owner of a shop on a Grand Trunk Railway line.

In 1861, he joined the militia eventually becoming a sergeant-major. In 1866, he was appointed editor of Le Canada, a Conservative Ottawa newspaper. In 1867, he became a translator in the House of Commons of Canada. In 1870, he started working for the Department of Militia and Defence eventually becoming chief clerk in 1889. He retired in 1903. In 1871, he married Augustine Parent, daughter of Étienne Parent.

He wrote poems, songs, and was a historian.

In 1882 he was appointed a charter member of the Royal Society of Canada, and served as its president from 1904 to 1905. In 1916, he was awarded an honorary LL.D. by the University of Toronto.

== Selected works ==
- Les Laurentiennes: poésies (Montréal, 1869)
- Histoire de la ville des Trois-Rivières et de ses environs (Montréal, 1870)
- Mélanges d'histoire et de littérature (Ottawa, 1876)
- Chants nouveaux (Ottawa, 1880)
- Histoire des Canadiens-français, 1608–1880: origine, histoire, religion, guerres, découvertes, colonisation, coutumes, vie domestique, sociale et politique, développement, avenir (8 volumes, 1882-1884)
- Mélanges Historiques : Études éparses et inédites (21 vols. Montreal 1918)
- "The French-Canadians and the Empire" . The Empire and the century. London: John Murray. 1905. pp. 420–423.

Professional and academic associations
Preceded by George Taylor Denison III	President of the Royal Society of Canada; 1904–1905	Succeeded by Alexander Johnson
