= George Taylor Denison =

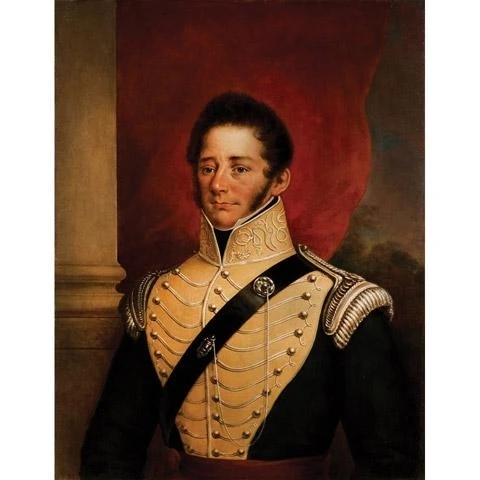
- Born: 29 December 1783; England
- Died: 18 December 1853 (aged 69); Toronto, Canada West
- Resting place: St. John's Cemetery on the Humber, Weston, Ontario
- Occupations: Landowner, military officer
- Spouses: 4
- Children: 13, including George

Captain George Taylor Denison (29 December 1783 – 18 December 1853) was a British-born landowner, military officer and community leader in Upper Canada (later Canada West).

== Life and career ==
He was born in England, the son of Captain John Denison and Sophia Taylor. He traveled to Upper Canada and the town of York, Upper Canada, in 1796 with his parents and two brothers. He inherited the bulk of his family's property and, after the War of 1812, purchased and acquired land through marriage around what is now the Kensington Market neighborhood of Toronto. At the end of his life, he held 556 acres (2.25 km^{2}) in York and was one of the wealthiest landowners in Canada West. He married four times and fathered thirteen children; he wed Esther Borden Lippincott (daughter of Richard Lippincott) in 1806, Maria Taylor in 1828, Elizabeth Eleanor Caldwell in 1835, and Mary Priscilla Coates in 1850.

In 1815, he built an estate named Belle Vue (including an orchard and farm) on the south side of Russell Creek, which followed the style of Georgian architecture. The 156-acre (0.63 km^{2}) property on which he built his new home, lot 17 and the eastern portion of lot 18 ran north from present day Queen Street West to Bloor Street, and east from Lippincott Street to Augusta Avenue. Belle Vue (where the Kiever Synagogue now stands across from Denison Square) stood at the head of a mile-long carriage path, which is now Denison Avenue.

He served with the Canadian Militia in the War of 1812 and, from 1822 to 1837, organized and financed a volunteer militia cavalry troop the York Dragoons, which he commanded during the Rebellions of 1837. The troop would later evolve into The Governor General's Body Guard (today The Governor General's Horse Guards). In 1846, he was given command of the 4th Battalion of the Toronto militia, a post he held until his death at Toronto in 1853. Denison is buried at St. John's Cemetery on the Humber in Weston, Ontario.

== Legacy ==
As a result of Denison's vast land holdings and the large number of children that he fathered, the Denison family featured prominently in the early history of Upper Canada and Ontario. Denison family names abound in the area, including the present-day names of Denison Square, Denison Avenue, Bellevue Avenue, as well as Major, Robert, Borden and Lippincott streets.

His grandson George Taylor Denison III was an officer in the army of the new Dominion of Canada and later served as a Toronto city councillor.

== See also ==
- Denison Armoury
