= John Denison (Royal Navy officer) =

Admiral John Denison DSO
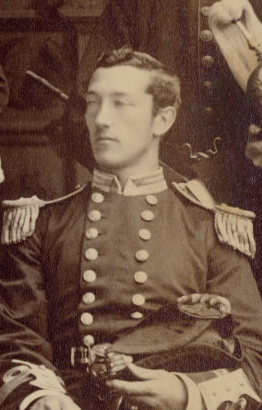
- John Denison in 1877
- Born: 25 May 1853; Toronto
- Died: March 6, 1939 (aged 85); Alverstock, Portsmouth, England
- Occupation: naval officer
- Known for: Said to be the first Admiral, RN, born in Canada
- Children: Bertram Denison
- Father: George Taylor Denison II

Admiral John Denison DSO (25 May 1853 – 6 March 1939) was a Canadian Royal Navy officer. He was described as the first Canadian to command a fleet.

== Background ==
His great-grandfather, grandfather, father, and five brothers served as army officers, but Denison joined the Navy in 1867, as a midshipman.

== Naval career ==
Denison was promoted to lieutenant on 16 April 1878, and to commander on 31 December 1891. From 1893 to 1896 he commanded the royal yacht HMY Victoria and Albert (1855), and on 13 May 1896 he was promoted to captain.

He was briefly in command of HMS Latona during summer 1897, and was in February 1899 appointed in command of the light cruiser HMS Melpomene, serving on the East Indies Station. He brought her home to pay off in July 1900.

From October 1900 to November 1902 Denison was in command of the protected cruiser HMS Niobe, serving in the Channel Squadron. In March 1901 Niobe was one of two cruisers to escort HMS Ophir, commissioned as royal yacht for the world tour of the Duke and Duchess of Cornwall and York (later King George V and Queen Mary), from Spithead to Gibraltar, and in September the same year she again escorted the royal yacht from St Vincent to Halifax, Nova Scotia. She took part in the fleet review held at Spithead on 16 August 1902 for the coronation of King Edward VII, and the following month visited Souda Bay, Crete for combined manoeuvres with other ships of the Channel and Mediterranean stations. After a brief visit to Gibraltar in early October, Denison took her to Portsmouth to pay off at Devonport in November 1902.

From July 1903 to September 1904 he was in command of the pre-dreadnought battleship HMS Montagu in her first commission in the Mediterranean Fleet, after which he was Captain Superintendent of Pembroke dockyard for two years from 1 October 1904. He served as naval aide de camp to King Edward VII from 1905 to 1906.

Denison was promoted to flag rank as rear-admiral on 18 September 1906, as vice-admiral on 10 February 1911, and to the rank of full admiral on 7 December 1913, retiring from the navy on the following day.

He re-entered the navy during World War I, and was senior naval officer in charge at Falmouth for a year.

His son, Bertram Denison, followed him into the Royal Navy, serving as a midshipman during the Boer War. He would later transfer to the Army. He was wounded in the head, and left for dead, leading his men in an attack, during the first battle of World War I.

Denison died in Alverstock, near Portsmouth, England on March 9, 1939.

Military offices
Preceded by Captain Gerald Walter Russell	Captain-Superintendent, Pembroke Dockyard; 1904–1906	Succeeded by Captain Henry Coare Kingsford
