= Frederick Charles Denison =

Canadian politician (1846–1896)

Lieutenant-Colonel Frederick Charles Denison CMG, MP
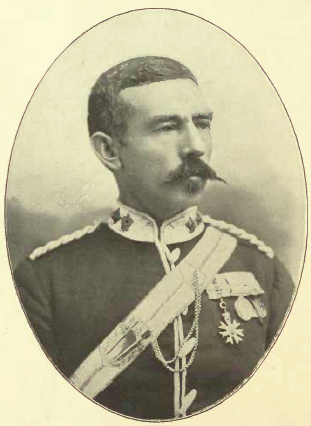

Member of the Canadian Parliament for West Toronto
- In office April 13, 1887 – April 15, 1896
- Preceded by: James Beaty, Jr.
- Succeeded by: Edmund Boyd Osler/Edward Frederick Clarke

Personal details
- Born: November 22, 1846 Toronto, Canada West
- Died: April 15, 1896 (aged 49) Toronto, Ontario
- Party: Conservative

Frederick Charles Denison CMG, MP (November 22, 1846 – April 15, 1896) was a Canadian militia officer, lawyer, and politician.

== Biography ==
Born near Toronto, Ontario, Denison was educated Upper Canada College, and after completing his literary studies began reading law. He was called to the Ontario bar in 1870.

His military experience began in 1865, when he joined the Canadian Militia as a cornet with the 1st Volunteer Militia Troop of Cavalry of York County (later The Governor General’s Body Guard). In 1868 he was made a lieutenant, in 1872 captain; four years later major; and in 1884 was promoted to the rank of lieutenant-colonel. Denison saw active service during the Fenian raids in 1866 and in the Red River Expedition of 1870, as aide-de-camp to Lord Wolseley.

He was an alderman from St. Stephens ward on the Toronto City Council from 1878 to 1883. In 1881, he was elected chairman of the executive committee. From 1884 to 1885, Denison went to Egypt in command of the Canadian Voyageurs on the Nile employed by the Imperial Government in the Sudan Campaign. He distinguished himself during this war, and was not only given prominent mention in the dispatches but received a medal with two clasps. In 1885 he was made a companion of the Order of St Michael and St George.

He won the West Toronto Conservative nomination for the 1887 federal election over three other candidates, including incumbent parliamentarian James Beaty, Jr. He subsequently won a narrow victory over his Liberal opponent in the general election. He was re-elected in 1891, and died of stomach cancer while still in office in 1896.
