= York, Upper Canada =

Unincorporated municipality in Home District, Upper Canada

York
- Capital town
- View of York from the harbour looking north in 1803
- Nickname: Muddy York
- Location in present-day Southern Ontario
- Coordinates: 43°39′01″N 79°22′19″W
- Colony: Upper Canada
- District: Home District
- County: York County
- Established: August 27, 1793
- Incorporated as the City of Toronto: March 6, 1834

Government
  - Governing Body: Upper Canada

York was a town and the second capital of the colony of Upper Canada. It is the predecessor to the old city of Toronto (1834–1998). It was established in 1793 by Lieutenant-Governor John Graves Simcoe as a "temporary" location for the capital of Upper Canada, while he made plans to build a capital near today's London, Ontario. Simcoe renamed the location York after Prince Frederick, Duke of York and Albany, George III's second son. Simcoe gave up his plan to build a capital at London, and York became the permanent capital of Upper Canada on February 1, 1796. That year Simcoe returned to Britain and was temporarily replaced by Peter Russell.

The original townsite was a compact ten blocks near the mouth of the Don River and a garrison was built at the channel to Toronto Harbour. Government buildings and a law court were established. Yonge Street was built, connecting York to the Holland River to the north. To the east, Kingston Road was built to the mouth of the Trent River. In 1797, the town site was expanded to the west to allow for public buildings and expansion. One of the new area's public functions, a public market, was started in 1803. It continues today as St. Lawrence Market.

The settlement was attacked by American troops during the War of 1812. As the British garrison retreated, they detonated their powder magazine, inflicting numerous casualties on the invading U.S. forces, who proceeded to loot and destroy the town. The victorious Americans chose not to occupy the town and the British eventually returned without conflict. A reprisal attack was made on the American capital of Washington, D.C. a year later. After the war was over, the town continued to grow, expanding to the west, leaving the original town site, a less desirable location, somewhat undeveloped. A new parliament building was erected, near the original location, but this burned down and a new building was built in the new lands to the west.

A permanent fort, Fort York, was built on the site of the garrison. Dundas Street was built to connect York to towns to the west. In the 1820s, the town experienced a surge of immigrants, expanding from 1,000 residents to over 9,000 by the time the town was incorporated as the "City of Toronto" in 1834. During its existence, the town did not have its own government; it was governed by the province of Upper Canada, with a mix of elected officials and an aristocracy known as the Family Compact controlling the government. By 1830, this led to an ongoing political conflict, which would later lead to the 1837 Upper Canada Rebellion.

== History ==
When Europeans first arrived at the site of York, the vicinity was inhabited by the Seneca people (from the Five Nations Haudenosaunee of New York State), who by then had displaced the Wendat (Huron) tribes that had occupied the region for centuries before c. 1600. By 1701, the Haudenosaunee villages that had been established along the north shore of Lake Ontario during the sixteenth century had been abandoned. The Algonkian Mississaugas then moved into the York region, created alliances with the former Iroquoian residents, and established their own settlements; one near the former Seneca village of Teiaiagon on the Humber River.

The name Toronto is derived from indigenous sources. A portage route from Lake Ontario to Lake Huron running through this point, the Toronto Carrying-Place Trail, led to widespread use of the name. The word "toronto", meaning "plenty" appears in a French lexicon of the Wendat language in 1632, and it appeared on French maps referring to various locations, including Georgian Bay, Lake Simcoe, and several rivers. In Mohawk, the word tkaronto, meant "place where trees stand in the water". It refers to the northern end of what is now Lake Simcoe, where the Wendat and preceding inhabitants had planted tree saplings to corral fish.

The shoreline was likely sandy and parts sloping down to Lake Ontario (see Geography of Toronto). The original shoreline followed what is now Front Street. Everything now south of Front Street is the result of land fill. The Toronto Islands were still connected to the mainland. It was wooded, with marshes in what is now Ashbridge's Bay and the then natural mouth of the Don (Keating Channel did not exist yet). Other than Lake Ontario, other waterways into old town included the Don and several other small creeks, such as Garrison Creek, Russell Creek and Taddle Creek.

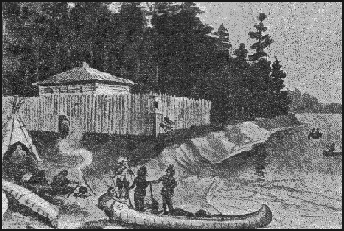
Depiction of Fort Rouillé, a French trading post, c. 1750s.

Between 1710 and 1750, French traders established two trading posts on the Humber River, Magasin Royale, and Fort Toronto. The success of Fort Toronto led the French to build Fort Rouillé on the current Exhibition grounds in 1750. It only lasted until 1759, abandoned after the fall of Fort Niagara, when the French retreated to Montreal. The British arrived the next year with an army to secure the location. The British claimed all of New France after the 1763 Treaty of Paris, and extended the province of Quebec to present-day Ontario.

=== Founding of York ===
After the American Revolutionary War, the region saw an influx of British settlers as United Empire Loyalists arrived in numbers north of Lake Ontario, as the British offered free land to many. As plans were being made to create the new province of Upper Canada, British North America Governor-General Lord Dorchester selected the area north of Toronto Bay for a new capital. Dorchester arranged for the Toronto Purchase with the Mississaugas of New Credit, thereby securing more than a 250,000 acres (1,000 km^{2}) of land. The purchase was disputed in 1788, and a further agreement was made in 1805, but a final settlement of the purchase would only come 200 years later in 2010, for a total of CA$145 million.

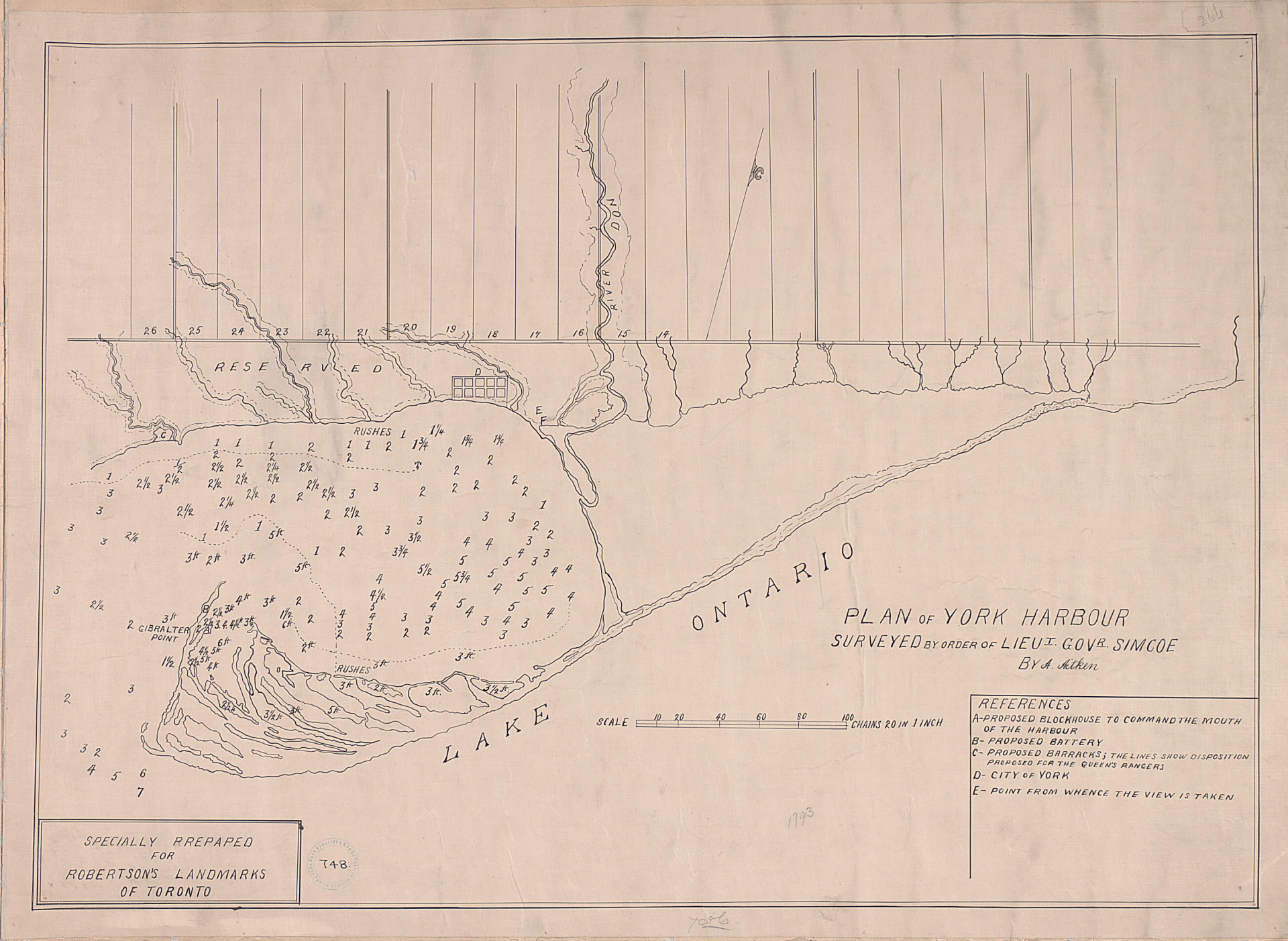
A map detailing the plan for York Harbour from 1793. On the map, Fort York is labelled as C, whereas the settlement of York was labelled as D.

In 1791, Upper Canada was established, with Newark (Niagara-on-the-Lake) its first capital. The first Lieutenant-Governor John Graves Simcoe arrived in 1792 and first visited the Toronto Purchase site in May 1793. Impressed by the site and harbour, he moved the capital to Toronto, on a "temporary" basis, while he worked on plans to build a capital in the vicinity of London, Ontario. Simcoe renamed the townsite York, rejecting the aboriginal name. The name of York was chosen to please King George, as a compliment to the Duke of York, his son. Simcoe founded York on August 27, 1793.

Simcoe and his family took residence in July 1793. They found the location to be an isolated wilderness, with dense forest right to the shore. A few families of Mississaugas were the only residents and "immense coveys of fowl". They lived in a tent that once belonged to Captain James Cook the explorer, at the foot of today's Bathurst Street. It would be the temporary capital until 1796, when Simcoe abandoned his plans to make London the capital. The first parliament in the new capital convened in June 1797, after Simcoe had returned to England and Peter Russell was named administrator of Upper Canada.

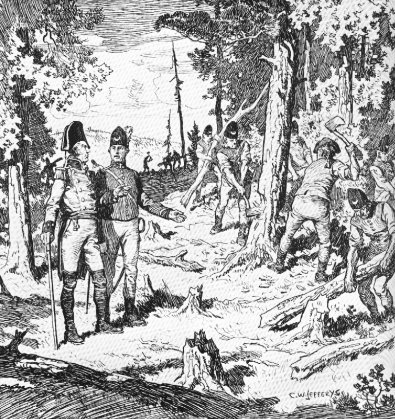
Depiction of the Queen's Rangers of York cutting trees down during the construction of Yonge Street, 1795.

The townsite was first surveyed in 1788, but Simcoe developed a new town plan. The Town of York was laid out in ten original blocks between today's Adelaide and Front streets (the latter following the shoreline) with the first church (St James Anglican), Town Hall and Wharf (named St Lawrence after the river) on the west and the first parliament buildings, blockhouse and windmill on the east. Taddle Creek lay on the eastern boundary, the Don River and its wetland further to the east. Two main roads were laid out: Lot Street (today's Queen Street) and Yonge Street, which was built as far north as the Holland River. In 1797, a garrison was built east of modern-day Bathurst Street, on the east bank of Garrison Creek.

In August 1796, Charles McCuen, a soldier in the Queen's Rangers, murdered Wabakinine, a Mississauga chief and one of the signers of the Toronto Purchase, on the waterfront. The murder of Wabakinine and his wife threatened to derail the peace between the British and the Mississaugas. The Mississaugas, already frustrated by the failed promises of the Toronto Purchase, considered a counterattack, either on the capital itself or on nearby pioneer farms. The York authorities brought McCuen to trial for murder but he was ultimately acquitted due to lack of evidence. An uprising was averted through the efforts of Joseph Brant, a First Nations interpreter, guide and diplomat.

All land south of Lot Street was reserved for expansion of the Town or Fort by the government as 'the Commons'. North of Lot Street was the "Liberties", the eventual rural Township of York. It was divided into large 'park lots' where the city's moneyed elite built their estates, such as 'the Grange' and 'Moss park.' With time, some of these estate lots were subdivided, like the Macaulay family estate between Yonge St and Osgoode Hall (now Toronto City Hall), which became a working-class neighbourhood known as Macaulaytown. The original townsite area is today known as the "Old Town".

On June 1, 1807, on the south east corner of King and George, a priest named Dr. G. Okill Stuart opened the Home District School, the first public school in York. The school taught both boys and girls and ran out of a little stone structure beside his home. Dr. Stuart's lectures were "curious, marked as it was with by unexpected elevations, and depressions of the voice and long closings of the eyes". In that same year, the first brick house in York was constructed, the home and store of Quetton St. George at King and Frederick. St. George imported the bricks from New York state.

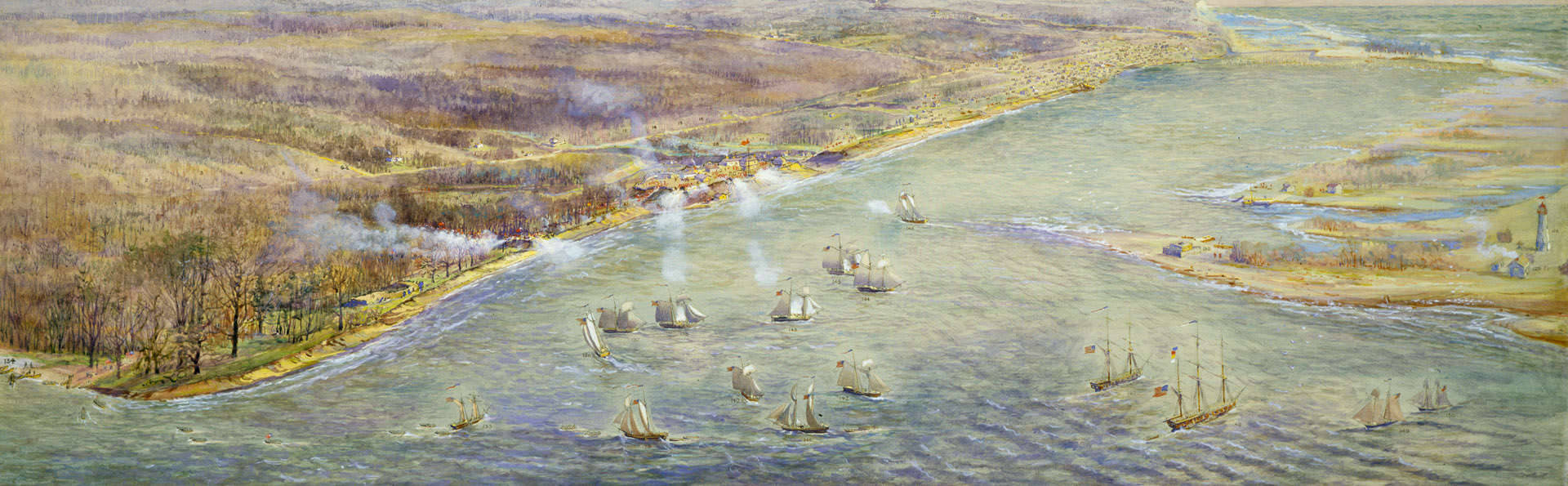
A depiction of the Battle of York in April 1813. The battle saw an American force supported by a naval flotilla land on the lake shore to the west, and advanced against York.

=== Battle of York ===
The Battle of York was fought on April 27, 1813. An American force supported by a squadron consisting of a ship-rigged corvette, a brig and twelve schooners landed on the lake shore to the west of the garrison, defeating the British and capturing the fort, town and dockyard. The Americans suffered heavy casualties, including Brigadier General Zebulon Pike who was leading the troops when the retreating British blew up the fort's magazine. The American forces carried out several acts of arson and looting in the town before withdrawing. Although the Americans won a clear victory, it did not have decisive strategic results as York was a less important objective in military terms than Kingston, where the British armed vessels on Lake Ontario were based.

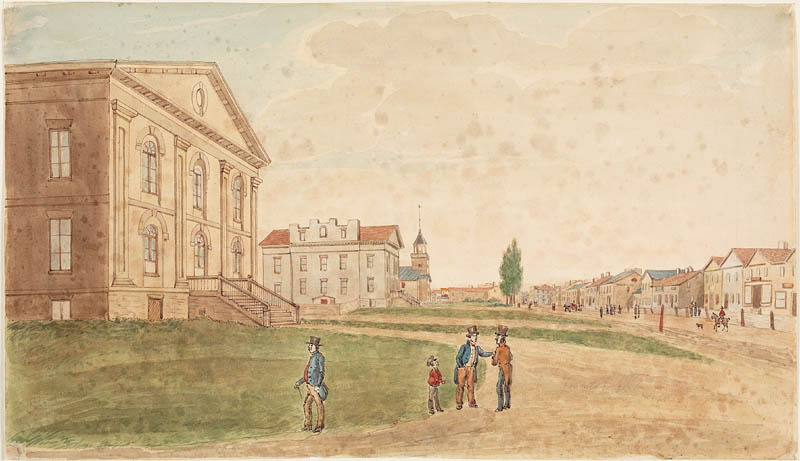
View of King Street, c. 1829. The settlement's courthouse, jail, and St. James Anglican Church are visible to the left of King Street.

The Town of York did not fill the small original blocks, instead development spread to the west; the area west to Peter Street had been annexed in 1797 on the order of the province. The town grid was extended west and plots of land near New (Jarvis) and Church streets were set aside for public buildings. St. Lawrence Market, St. James' Cathedral and the Courthouse and Jail on King would be built on the public reserves. The Town was also extended in the east along King Street (then a part of Kingston Road) to the Don River. There, Angell's Bridge stretched across the Don. A path led from Angell's Bridge south to the peninsula and the lighthouse.

The chief business part of the town was King and Front streets, the western limit being Yonge street, and the eastern limit the Don bridge. There were, however, many private residences west of York on Yonge, Front and Lot Streets, and as far west as the garrison. In comparison, the original town site itself was not fully developed by the time of incorporation. The Parliament buildings, destroyed in 1813 by war and later by fire, were moved to the west, helping to draw persons to the west. The town became fully developed as far west as York Street, with some built-up areas west to Peter. North of Lot Street, Spadina Avenue was already laid out to the north, and the two north–south roadways that would become University Avenue. 150 acres (61 ha) of land had been purchased in 1825 to be the campus of King's College, today's University of Toronto, at the north end of the roads.

Rougher conditions existed in several area. "Macaulaytown", (named after the Queen's Ranger who had been given the park lot) basically a shanty town, and the site of many poor immigrants, was north of Lot and west of Yonge. Squatters lived a meager existence along the Don River and the lakefront. Conditions were poor on both sides of Church Street in back lanes. The worst was reputed to be Henrietta Lane, off King, west of Church, south to Market (Wellington today), which in 1832 was a center of a cholera epidemic. Pearson recalls the muddy and filthy lane as being the site of a few shanties inhabited by widows, who kept cows. The cows would be led to the garrison common each day to graze. Two stables were also nearby, making the neighbourhood "odiferous" in his opinion. The area around Henrietta would eventually be cleared of the slum, its north end on King closed off first, and the area redeveloped around the new Colborne Street. March Street (Lombard today) was also noted as being rough and having a red-light district.

As the town grew, fire prevention became more important. Starting in 1820, homes were required to have two leather buckets on the front of their houses. If a fire alarm was raised, a line of citizens from the bay to the burning building passed the buckets. In 1826, the first fire company was inaugurated and a fire hall was built on Church Street. Soldiers at nearby Fort York also assisted in fire fighting when needed.

There was no official police force. Able-bodied male citizens were required to report for night duty as special constables for a fixed number of nights a year under the penalty of fine or imprisonment in a system known as "watch and ward". The first police office was opened in 1826, only open from 11 a.m to 2 p.m daily except Sunday, Christmas Day and Good Friday. The number of constables was eleven in 1810, twenty in 1820 and twelve in 1830.

There was a major cholera epidemic in Upper Canada from 1832 to 1834. There were two outbreaks in York, in 1832 and 1834. About 1,000 persons died in the two outbreaks. The disease, poorly understood at the time and caused by contaminated food or water, was acutely infectious. The number of patients overwhelmed the hospital and special sheds had to be built adjacent to house the patients.

== Government and politics ==
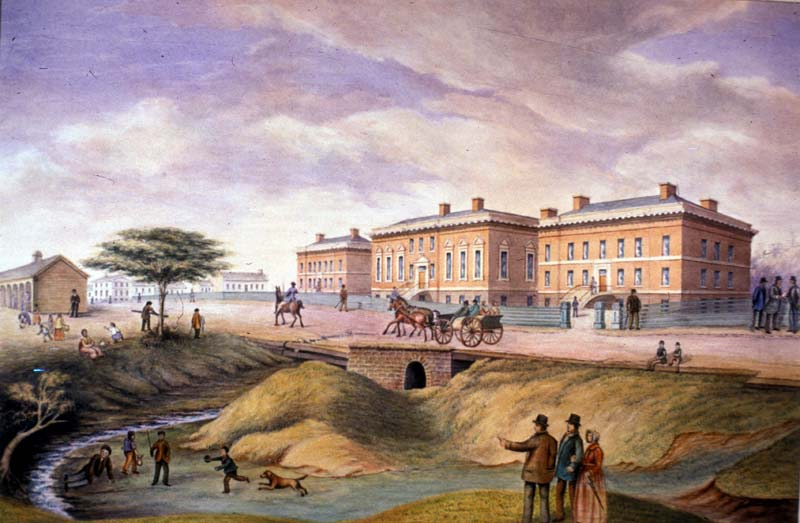
Depiction of the third Parliament Building for Upper Canada in 1834. York was named the seat of government for Upper Canada in 1797.

Upper Canada was established with a bicameral legislature. The upper chamber, the Executive Council of Upper Canada was appointed by, and served the Lieutenant Governor of Upper Canada. The lower chamber or Legislative Assembly, was elected from the various districts. York was situated in Home District and Home District Council was responsible for municipal matters for York.

=== Family Compact ===
The Family Compact was a small closed group of men who exercised most of the political, economic and judicial power in Upper Canada from the 1810s to the 1840s. Several were members of the Executive Council. It was noted for its conservatism and opposition to democracy.

Upper Canada did not have a hereditary nobility. In its place, senior members of Upper Canada bureaucracy, the Executive Council of Upper Canada and Legislative Council of Upper Canada, made up the elite of the Compact. These men sought to solidify their personal positions into family dynasties and acquire all the marks of gentility. They used their government positions to extend their business and speculative interests.

The centre of the Compact was York. Its most important member was the Rev. John Strachan; many of the other members were his former students, or people who were related to him. Another prominent member of the Compact was Sir John Beverley Robinson who was the Chief Justice of Upper Canada for 34 years from 1829. The rest of the members were mostly descendants of United Empire Loyalists or recent upper-class British settlers such as the Boulton family, builders of the Grange.

=== Reform opposition ===
Reform activity emerged in the 1830s when those suffering the abuses of the Family Compact began to emulate the organizational forms of the British Reform Movement, and organized Political Unions under the leadership of William Lyon Mackenzie. The British Political Unions had successfully petitioned for the Great Reform Act 1832 that eliminated much of the political corruption in the English Parliamentary system. Prominent politicians in reform city politics included James Lesslie, a bookseller and founder of the Mechanics Institute, Bank of the People and House of Refuge & Industry; Jesse Ketchum, the Member of the Legislative Assembly for the city; Dr Thomas David Morrison, founder of the Upper Canada Political Union, and mayor of the city in 1836; and William O'Grady, publisher of the reform newspaper, The Correspondent.

=== Political conflict ===
==== Types riot, 1826 ====
In 1826, in the "Types Riot", the printing press of William Lyon Mackenzie was destroyed by the young lawyers of the Juvenile Advocate's Society with the complicity of the Attorney General, the Solicitor General and the magistrates of Toronto.

Mackenzie had published a series of satires under the pseudonym of "Patrick Swift, nephew of Jonathan Swift" in an attempt to humiliate the members of the Family Compact running for the board of the Bank of Upper Canada, and Henry John Boulton the Solicitor General, in particular. Mackenzie's articles worked, and they lost control. In revenge they sacked Mackenzie's press, throwing the type into the lake. The 'juvenile advocates' were the students of the Attorney General and the Solicitor General, and the act was performed in broad daylight in front of William Allan, bank president and magistrate. They were never charged, and it was left to Mackenzie to launch a civil lawsuit instead.

There are three implications of the Types riot according to historian Paul Romney. First, he argues the riot illustrates how the elite's self-justifications regularly skirted the rule of law they held out as their Loyalist mission. Second, he demonstrated that the significant damages Mackenzie received in his civil lawsuit against the vandals did not reflect the soundness of the criminal administration of justice in Upper Canada. And lastly, he sees in the Types riot "the seed of the Rebellion" in a deeper sense than those earlier writers who viewed it simply as the start of a highly personal feud between Mackenzie and the Family Compact. Romney emphasizes that Mackenzie's personal harassment, the "outrage", served as a lightning rod of discontent because so many Upper Canadians had faced similar endemic abuses and hence identified their political fortunes with his.

See also: Mackenzie' own account

==== Election riot, 1832 ====
The great meeting took place yesterday, and has resulted in the most signal and unequivocal defeat of the Yankee Republican party. The British constitutionalists carried every thing before them, and Mackenzie and his abettors are put down now and for ever.

— Patriot 3 April 1832.

Buoyed by large public displays of support following his re-election in January 1832, Mackenzie called for a public meeting in York on March 23, in the face of an increasingly well organized opposition, and threats of violence. Both supporters and opponents of Mackenzie gathered in front of the Court House at noon, when Sheriff William Botsford Jarvis granted the chair of the meeting to Dr. Dunlop, of the Canada Company, rather than Reform MPP Jesse Ketchum, the reformers' choice, despite a reform majority. The tories then made short order of the meeting, passing a resolution in favour of the colonial administration, and adjourning.

Mackenzie's supporters had, in the meanwhile, reassembled to the west in front of the jail, where they set about passing their own resolutions. Ketchum, Mackenzie, Morrison and others stood in a wagon to address the crowd, when twenty members of the Orange Order grabbed the wagon sending them flying. In an attempt to defuse the growing tension, Sheriff Jarvis assembled the government supporters into a parade of 1,200, which marched off to government house in the west end to cheer Lieut. Governor Colborne, before returning to the Market Square. As they re-passed the Court House, they were joined by a group carrying an effigy of Mackenzie, who made their way to the Advocate office on Church St., which they began to pelt with stones. After burning the effigy of Mackenzie, a general skirmish ensued when the terrified printers fired a warning shot over the mob's heads. A riot ensued that lasted the night.

==== Grand Convention of Delegates, 1834 ====
Mackenzie returned to Toronto from his London journey in the last week of August 1833, to find his appeals to the British Parliament had been ultimately ineffective. At an emergency meeting of Reformers, David Willson, leader of the Children of Peace, proposed extending the nomination process for members of the Legislative Assembly they had begun in their village of Hope north of Toronto to all four Ridings of York (now York Region), and to establish a "General Convention of Delegates" from each riding in which to establish a common political platform. This convention could then become the core of a "permanent convention" or political party - an innovation not yet seen in Upper Canada. The organization of this convention was a model for the "Constitutional Convention" Mackenzie organized for the Rebellion of 1837, where many of the same delegates were to attend.

The convention was held in the old Court House on February 27, 1834, with delegates from all four of the York ridings. The week before, Mackenzie published Willson's call for a "standing convention" (political party). The day of the convention, the Children of Peace led a "Grand Procession" with their choir and band (the first civilian band in the province) to the Old Court House. David Willson was the main speaker before the convention and "he addressed the meeting with great force and effect". The convention nominated four Reform candidates, all of whom were ultimately successful in the election. The convention stopped short, however, of establishing a political party. Instead, they formed yet another Political Union.

==== Incorporation as City of Toronto, 1834 ====
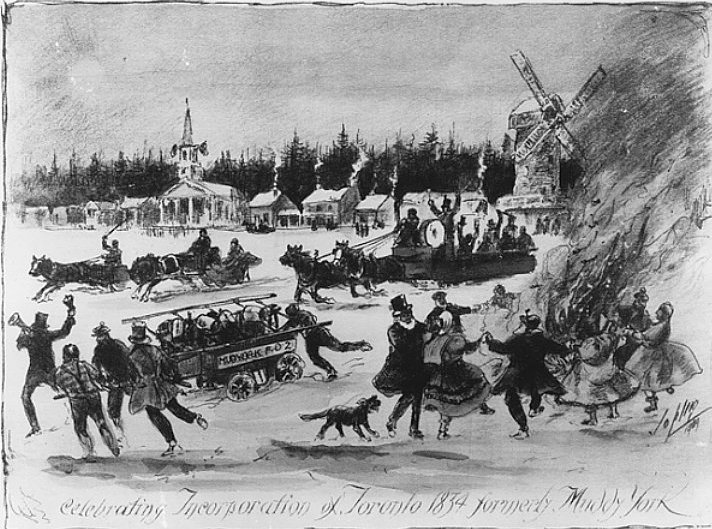
People celebrating the incorporation of York into the City of Toronto in 1834.

In 1833, several prominent reformers had petitioned the Assembly to have the town incorporated as the "City of Toronto", which would also have made the position of magistrate elective. The Tory-controlled Legislative Assembly struggled to find a means of creating a legitimate electoral system that might, nonetheless, minimize the chances of reformers being elected. The bill passed on March 6, 1834, and proposed two different property qualifications for voting. There was a higher qualification for the election of aldermen (who would also serve as magistrates), and a lower one for common councillors. Two aldermen and two councilmen would be elected from each city ward. This relatively broad electorate was offset by a much higher qualification for election to office, which essentially limited election to the wealthy much like the old Court of Quarter Sessions it replaced. The mayor was elected by the aldermen from among their number, and a clear barrier was erected between those of property who served as full magistrates, and the rest. Only 230 of the city's 2,929 adult men met this stringent property qualification. However, the Family Compact - and their member for Parliament Sheriff William B. Jarvis in particular - alienated a large part of the city's construction tradesmen in late 1833. Left without pay, they held Toronto's first strike. Jarvis had them arrested, and obstructed legislation that would protect their pay. As a result, there was a major landslide in the first city elections. The first mayor of the new City of Toronto was William Lyon Mackenzie.

== Population ==
York, Upper Canada
Year	Pop.	±%
1793	3	—
1796	600	+19900.0%
1812	1,460	+143.3%
1813	720	−50.7%
1825	1,600	+122.2%
1832	5,500	+243.8%
1834	9,250	+68.2%
The population figures for York from 1796 to 1834 include people living in the surrounding areas of the town centre:

York's population was primarily from the British Isles (from Scotland, England, Wales and Ireland) with a few other European settlers (French, German and Dutch). York being a garrison town meant there were one or more regiments of Imperial troops stationed there. The officers were considered an acquisition to society, and, "many of the fair daughters of York formed marriages with these gallant fellows."

The town saw a wave of English immigrants in the later 1820s. In 1826, the population was 1,700, in 1830, 2,860 and in 1834, 9,254.

== See also ==
- Denison family, an influential, land-holding family in the development of the town of York, Ontario
