= James Buchanan Macaulay =

Canadian lawyer and judge (1793–1859)

The Hon. Sir James Buchanan Macaulay CB

Colonel Sir James Buchanan Macaulay, CB (3 December 1793 – 26 November 1859) was a lawyer and judge in colonial Canada.

Macaulay served as an officer in the War of 1812 with the United States and fought at the Battles of Ogdensburg, Oswego, Lundy's Lane, and at the Siege of Fort Erie. After the war, he studied law and was admitted to the Canadian bar in 1822. In 1829, he was appointed a temporary judge of the Court of Queen's Bench, and a permanent judge in 1829. From 1849 to 1856, he served as Chief Justice of the Court of Common Pleas. He later became judge of the Court of Error and Appeal and chairman of the commission that revised and consolidated the statutes of Canada and Upper Canada into three volumes.

== Early life ==
Macaulay, born at Newark, Upper Canada, 3 December 1793, was the second son of James Macaulay and Elizabeth Tuck Hayter. His father was posted from England to Canada in 1792, attached to the Queen's Rangers, and was afterwards the Chief Medical Officer of Upper Canada, under the patronage of his friend John Graves Simcoe, the first Lieutenant Governor of Upper Canada.

== Military career ==
Macaulay served as an ensign in the 98th regiment. In 1812, he joined the Glengarry Fencibles as a lieutenant, and fought during the War of 1812 with America at the Battles of Ogdensburg, Oswego, Lundy's Lane, and at the Siege of Fort Erie. At the close of the war in 1815 his corps was disbanded and, after studying law, he was admitted to the Canadian bar in 1822.

== Publishing career ==
In 1826 Macaulay was a churchwarden at St James' church. He asked John Fenton to write a letter to the Colonial Advocate denying a story that Fenton wanted to publish stories about the church. Mackenzie refused to print the letter, so Macaulay wrote to the Advocate under the pseudonym "A Churchwarden" explaining that Fenton had been fired and rehired in his position with the church. When Fenton's letter was published in the Observer, Macaulay asked the editor of the Advocate William Lyon Mackenzie not to print his or Fenton's letters. Instead, the Advocate printed the letters with negative commentary. Macaulay responded by printing a pamphlet of his correspondence with Mackenzie, including letters Mackenzie marked as private. This pamphlet caused Mackenzie to publish personal information and gossip on the Family Compact, including Macaulay.

== Legal career ==
On June 8, 1826, Macaulay witnessed the Types Riot. He stopped briefly to talk to Stephen Heward and William Allan but left quickly hoping not to be seen by others. Another person recognised him laughing and trying to cover his face while walking away from the riot. Samuel Jarvis hired Macaulay as his attorney when Jarvis was sued for trespassing during the riots. Macaulay advised his client to not plead innocence as he had witnessed the riots and would struggle to argue that defence. Macaulay suggested Jarvis claim that the property damage was for a morally appropriate reason to stop Mackenzie's negative reporting and that they seek an out-of-court settlement.

Macaulay rejected Mackenzie's offer of £2000 to settle the lawsuit and counterproposed £200. In his communications with Mackenzie's lawyer James Edward Small he maintained the strategy of claiming the riots were morally acceptable and the damage to the printing press and destroyed type was not worth £2000. His final offer was £300 to settle the lawsuit.

== Judicial career ==
He rose rapidly in his profession and was an executive councillor during the administration of Peregrine Maitland. He was first appointed a temporary judge of the Court of Queen's Bench, and a permanent judge in 1829.

On the first establishment of the Court of Common Pleas in December 1849 he was made the Chief Justice, and continued to preside there until his retirement on a pension in 1856, but afterwards became judge of the Court of Error and Appeal. As chairman of the commission appointed to revise and consolidate the statutes of Canada and Upper Canada, Macaulay helped to reduce the whole statutory law of the country from its conquest to his own time into three volumes, a work of great labour and corresponding value, which he just lived to see completed. He was gazetted C.B. 30 November 1858, and knighted by patent 13 January 1859.

== Family ==
Macaulay was a brother of John Simcoe Macaulay and the uncle of John Beverley Robinson. His brothers-in-law included Christopher Alexander Hagerman, John William Gamble and John Solomon Cartwright.

In 1821, Macaulay married Rachel Crookshank Gamble, daughter of John Gamble (1755–1811), a Loyalist Surgeon with the Queen's Rangers. They had three surviving daughters. Catherine McGill Macaulay, married Benjamin Homer Dixon (1819–1899) of Homewood, Toronto, Knight of the Order of the Netherlands Lion. Lady Macaulay died in England on 17 July 1883, at the home of her son-in-law, Edward Henry Bennett (1822–1897) J.P., of Sparkford Hall, Somerset, whose son with Macaulay's youngest daughter, Louisa Birchall Macauley, was the Anglican scholar Frank Bennett.

Macaulay died 26 November 1859, at the home he had built on his father's land in Toronto, Wickham Lodge, which he named after the English village of Wickham, Hampshire where two of his maternal aunts lived with their respective husbands: Admiral Thomas Revell Shivers (1751–1827) and Lieutenant-Commander Thomas Dorsett-Birchall (d. 1836). He left his home and $40,000 to his wife (equivalent to $816,000 in 2025).
