= James Macaulay (Canadian physician) =

Physician in Upper Canada

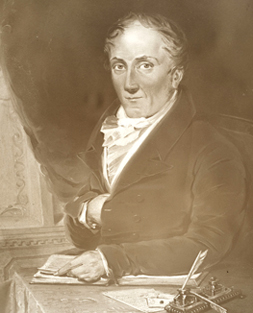
- Born: 1759/69; Glasgow, Scotland
- Died: 1822; York, Upper Canada
- Occupations: Surgeon & landowner
- Spouse(s): Elizabeth Tuck Hayter (m.1790); Rachel Crookshank (m.1817)

James Macaulay (September, 1759/69 – January 1, 1822) M.D., J.P. was the Chief Medical Officer of Upper Canada; a landowner and Justice of the Peace for York, Upper Canada.

== Early life ==
James Macaulay, born in September 1759 or 1769, was the son of Rev. Mr Macaulay of Glasgow. According to Edward Chadwick's Ontarian Families, 1894, the arms of James Macaulay's family "as shown on an old seal, so much worn as to be difficult to decipher, are apparently: Gu, two arrows in saltire arg, surmounted of a fess chequy of the second and first between three buckles or. Crest: A booted spur. Motto: Dulce Periculum". These directly correspond with the arms of the MacAulays of Ardincaple Castle, whose chief was reduced to owning only a few farms by the early 1700s.

James Macaulay gained a commission into the British army as a surgeon's mate in 1779 and was drafted via a Scottish regiment (possibly the 73rd (Perthshire) Regiment of Foot) to join the Queen's Rangers, with whom he served throughout the American Revolution. In 1785, he transferred to the 33rd Regiment of Foot and returned with them to England the following year as they took up duty as the King's Guard at Windsor Castle. In 1789, Macaulay's former commanding officer, John Graves Simcoe, recommended him to the post of surgeon to the New South Wales Regiment, but he did not go to Australia. When Simcoe was appointed Lieutenant Governor of Upper Canada in 1791, he began organizing his staff before he set sail and he chose Macaulay to be his chief surgeon in the new Canadian colony. Macaulay accompanied Simcoe to Upper Canada, arriving at the provincial capital, Niagara-on-the-Lake, in 1792.

The Macaulays enjoyed a close relationship with the Simcoes which immediately made them prominent members in local society, aided by the fact that Macaulay's wife had known Elizabeth Simcoe from childhood in England, becoming firm friends in Upper Canada. This closeness drew jealousy from some Canadians, notably the Provincial Secretary William Jarvis in 1795.

== Career in the Canadas ==
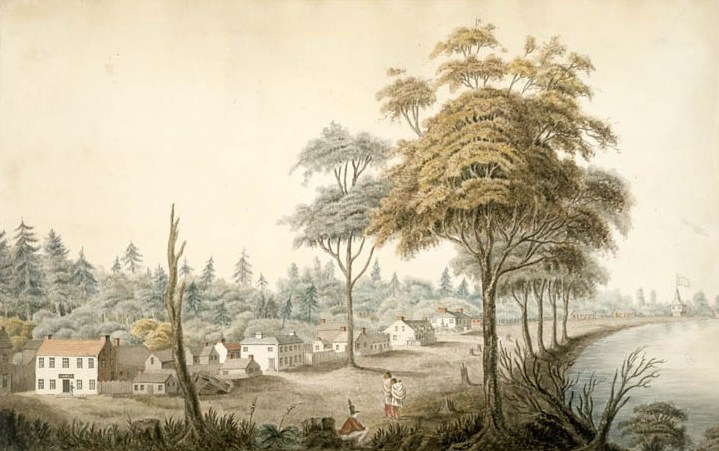
Front Street, York, Upper Canada; 1804

In 1796, Macaulay again accompanied Simcoe to the new provincial capital, York. Macaulay acquired several large parcels of land there due to his military service, and helped by his close friendship with the Lieutenant-Governor. In 1800, Macaulay was appointed Justice of the Peace and served on the commission to oversee improvements to Yonge Street. In 1803, along with Judge Henry Allcock, Rev. George Okill Stuart and others, he was on the committee to build an Anglican church. That same year (1803), Macaulay was appointed Chief Medical Officer in both Upper and Lower Canada, and Surgeon-General to the British Forces in the Canadas. From 1805, this required him to live in Quebec City, though his family remained in York. In 1808, he lost the post to William Somerville, the Deputy Inspector of Hospitals on the staff of Sir James Henry Craig, Governor-General of the Canadas. He was refused the position of Deputy Inspector of Hospitals and instead in 1810 was appointed a medical examiner in Lower Canada. When Somerville returned to England in 1811, he was again appointed Chief Medical Officer.

During the War of 1812, he helped to plan and establish military hospitals in both the Canadas. In 1813, he served with Lieutenant-General Sir George Prevost at the attack on Sackets Harbor, New York, and, following his appointment that July as Deputy Inspector of Hospitals, was with Major-General Francis de Rottenburg on the Niagara Peninsula. He was still serving there at the end of the war and subsequently was stationed at Kingston until placed on half pay in 1817.

== Return to York, Upper Canada ==
Returning to York, he served on the first Medical Board of Upper Canada and acted as its Chief Medical Officer from 1819 until his death three years later. With James Baby, Peter Robinson (1785–1838) and others, he was appointed to a commission formed in 1819 to deal with estates forfeited during the War of 1812, and he joined with other members of York’s élite, including William Allan, Thomas Gibbs Ridout and William Warren Baldwin in promoting the bank which was to be chartered as the Bank of Upper Canada.

Described as 'an assiduous collector of land', before 1800 alone Macaulay had acquired 5,300 acres (21 km^{2}). He lived with his family at Teraulay Cottage. Governor John Graves Simcoe described his friend Macaulay as "a young man attached to his profession, and of that docile, patient, and industrious turn... that will willingly direct itself to any pursuit." The York Observer reported at his death,

It becomes our painful duty to communicate to our readers the decease of Dr Macaulay of this town. In the death of this truly valuable member of society, charity has lost its best supporter, and the unfortunate emigrants their best friend. He was ever ready to wait upon and relieve the forlorn stranger not only with his medicine, but with his purse; and it is to be hoped that those gentlemen who are left behind will endeavour to imitate his unbounded liberality. The House of Assembly and the Honourable Legislative Council adjourned to attend the funeral.

== Family ==
Macaulay and his wife, Elizabeth Tuck Hayter (1770–1809), were married at Alverstoke, England, in 1790. She was the daughter of Naval Lieutenant Samuel Hayter (1737–1800) of Wareham Priory, and formerly of East Creech Manor, Isle of Purbeck, Dorset; a grandson of Captain Seth Jermy. They were the parents of four sons and four daughters. Two sons (George and Allan) died in early manhood, leaving John Simcoe Macaulay and Sir James Buchanan Macaulay. Their eldest daughter, Elizabeth, married The Hon. Christopher Alexander Hagerman, and they were the parents of Mrs John Beverley Robinson. The second daughter, Mary, married The Hon. John William Gamble, and another daughter, Sarah, married The Hon. John Solomon Cartwright. Through position, association and marriage, Macaulay's family were one of the most influential of the kind in early Upper Canada.

== See also ==
- Biography at the Dictionary of Canadian Biography Online
- Simcoe's Gentry, The Macaulay Family of York
