= Seth Jermy =

Royal Navy officer (1653–1724)

Captain Seth Jermy
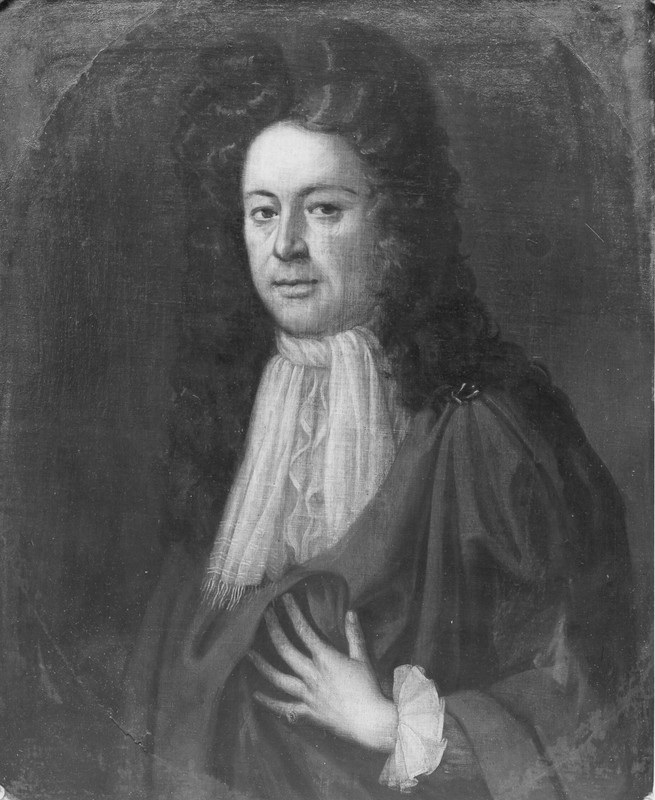
- Born: 2 September 1653; Whitechapel, Middlesex
- Died: 3 September 1724 (aged 71); Stratford, Middlesex
- Military career
- Allegiance: United Kingdom of Great Britain and Ireland
- Branch: Royal Navy
- Rank: Captain
- Conflicts: Battle of Barfleur

Captain Seth Jermy (1653–1724) was an officer of the Royal Navy, famous for fighting a particularly hard-fought action against an overwhelming French force while commander of HMS Nightingale.

== Family and early life ==
Jermy was born in 1653, the son of William Jermy (d. 1662) of Brightwell Hall, Suffolk, and Katherine Blackhurst. His father was a great grandson of Sir William FitzWilliam. The Jermy family were prominent members of the landed gentry in Norfolk and Suffolk between the 13th and 18th centuries.

He appears to have joined the Navy at a rather later age than usual. He was a midshipman on HMS Monmouth from 2 July 1689 to 2 March 1689/90, and on HMS Edgar from 3 March 1689/90 to 26 October 1691, and later from 16 December 1690 to 2 February 1690/1. By 1 July 1691 he was Second Lieutenant on HMS Northumberland, and was with her at the battle of Barfleur in 1692. He was First Lieutenant of the Grafton in 1694, the Burford in 1695, and the Lion in 1696. In January 1696/7 he was promoted to command the brigantine Spy, and in 1702 was appointed to the frigate Nightingale, of 24 guns and 115 men.

== Command of the Nightingale ==
For the next five years HMS Nightingale's duties consisted of escorting colliers and corn ships between the Forth, Tyne, Humber and Thames, protecting them from French privateers. One 24 August 1707, however, she fought an action against a French squadron.

=== Battling the French ===
On the morning of the battle, a squadron of six French galleys, whose commodore, the Chevalier de Langeron, flew his flag in the La Palme, set out from Dunkirk in good weather. With the commodore was Captain Smith, a renegade Englishman, who had obtained authority to attack and pillage the town of Harwich, using de Langeron's squadron which carried the incendiary materials and a division of soldiers. Smith had served in the Royal Navy and on several merchant ships, acquiring a good knowledge of both channel coasts. But he was never a captain in the Royal Navy. A Jacobite, he had an implacable hatred for the Protestant Queen and administration of England.

The squadron arrived in the mouth of the Thames early in the evening, but Smith commanded them to withdraw somewhat so that they could land at Harwich in the dark. Hardly had they hove-to than a lookout reported an English convoy thirty-five merchantmen and an escorting frigate to the northward, heading west. This was a merchant convoy from the Texel (at the mouth of the Zuiderzee) bound for the Thames, escorted by HMS Nightingale.

The French Commodore called a council of war, which decided to try to capture the convoy instead of attacking Harwich – much to Smith's annoyance. The plan was that four galleys should cut the merchantmen off from the Thames, and that La Palme and the Chevalier de Mauvilier's galley should overcome the frigate. All galleys set sail and rowed hard towards the approaching English ships, and Nightingale soon realised that the convoy was in danger. Captain Jermy ordered the merchantmen to crowd on all sail and make for the Thames, while he would engage the galleys.

Nightingale set full sail for the two galleys, themselves propelled by forced rowing since night was approaching. La Palme, a league ahead of her consort, fired at the frigate when within range, but without response, and at musket range the French musketeers opened fire. Nightingale suddenly went about, as if to flee. The French called the English cowards, and de Langeron ordered his galley to drive its beak, the strongest part, into Nightingale's stern, her weakest point, preparatory to boarding her.

Just as the beak was about to strike, Nightingale, by a clever stroke of the helm, evaded the galley and turned her broadside to it, so close that the galley's oars were broken. Nightingale secured La Palme with grappling irons, and fired a broadside of grapeshot; at the same time a hail of grenades came from aloft. Nightingale then sent fifty men aboard, to deal with any men still alive.

With La Palme rendered useless, de Langeron himself hoisted the distress signal to summon his squadron to his aid, even though the four galleys had already forced most of the convoy to strike sail. When the galleys turned back, the merchantmen set sail again and made for the Thames.

Nightingale was soon surrounded, and in no state to return either cannon or musket shot. Twenty-five grenadiers from each galley boarded the frigate, but were driven back by a murderous fire from the officers gathered under the poop, and by blows from the pikes and swords of the crew, who were under a grating set in the top deck. A second attack was repulsed. The French then had to force open the grating with crowbars to capture the crew, which they did, but not without considerable losses. The officers also gave a good account of themselves before being overcome.

All had now surrendered except Captain Jermy, who shut himself in his cabin under the poop, firing guns and pistols and declaring that he would not be taken alive. His officers told de Langeron that he would blow up the powder magazine, to which he had easy access, rather than surrender; this would threaten three thousand Frenchman's lives. The captain was civilly asked to surrender, but he again opened fire. A sergeant and twelve grenadiers were then sent to take him; the sergeant broke the cabin door and was immediately shot dead, whereupon the grenadiers fled.

These delays enabled Jermy to see, from their lights, that the merchantmen had all reached the protection of the River Thames. However, to gain more time, Jermy said that he would only surrender his sword to the commodore in person. A truce was arranged, and de Langeron replied that a commodore should not quit his post. Jermy, now sure that the convoy was safe, gave up his sword. When Jermy was brought to the French officers, they were surprised to see "a very little man, quite deformed and hunchbacked." The commodore complimented him on his bravery; he replied, "I have no regret for the loss of my ship, since I have succeeded in my design, which was to save the convoy entrusted to my care. As for myself, if you treat me as a man of honour, I, or some other of my nation, may some day have the opportunity of acting in the same way towards you." de Langeron was quite taken by these remarks, and returned Jermy's sword, saying "Take back this sword, sir; you well deserve to wear it, and you are my prisoner only in name." But soon Jermy had to be restrained from using his sword, for he saw the renegade Smith in the cabin and tried to attack him.

Jermy's wife was able to secure an audience with Queen Anne for his exchange, and in 1708 he was returned to England. He faced a routine court-martial for the loss of his ship, and was honourably acquitted. He was immediately given command of the Swallow Prize, and in 1710 was appointed to the Antelope, on which he served until he was superannuated in 1712.

== Family ==
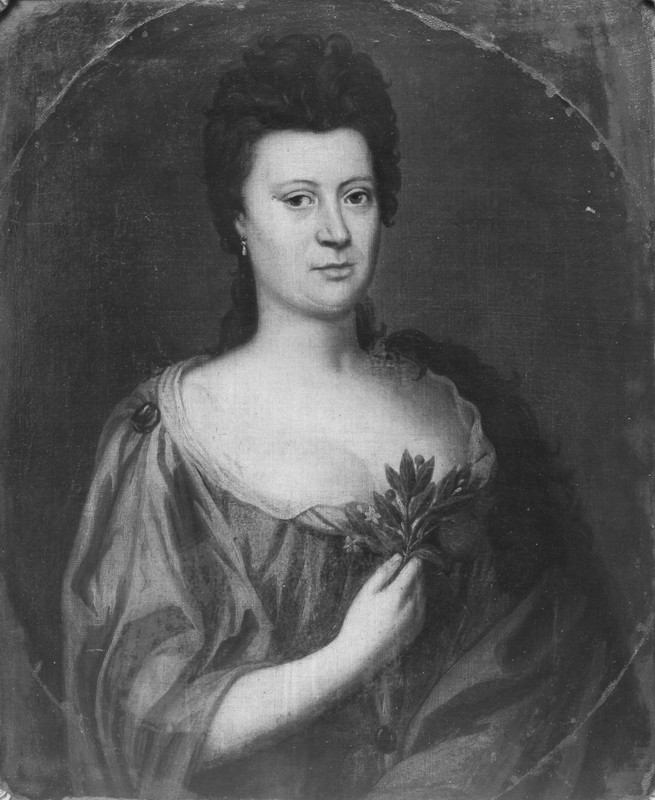
Mrs Mary Piggott (née Martin) Jermy, wearing the dress she wore for an audience with Queen Anne

In 1692, Seth Jermy married Mary (née Martin) Piggott (1660–1738), widow of Captain Joseph Piggott of the Royal Navy, with whom Jermy had served on HMS Monmouth and Edgar. After her husband's death she moved to Dorset to live with her daughter. They were the parents of two surviving children,

- Seth Jermy (1694–1745), was for many years Secretary to the Commissioners of the Victualling Office. In 1737, at Westminster Abbey, he married Anne (1706–1765), only daughter of John Harwood (1658–1730) Esq., LL.D., F.R.S, F.S.A., of Hagbourne and Crickheath, co. Salop; Doctor's Commons, Commissary of St Paul's Cathedral etc., and a contemporary of Christopher Wren. In the will of Isaac Jermy, gent. of Bury St Edmunds, son of Colonel Robert Jermy (1601–1677) of Bayfield Hall, dated 5 November 1735, Seth Jermy the younger is described as his kinsman.
- Mary Jermy (d.1783), married Edmund Hayter (1689–1782), of East Creech Manor, High Sheriff of Dorset. Their daughter married Rev. Sir Thomas Bankes I'Anson, 5th Bt., Rector of Corfe Castle, Dorset; grandson of John Bankes of Kingston Lacy Hall. Their son, Lieutenant Samuel Hayter (1737–1800) R.N., of Wareham Priory, was the father of Mrs James Macaulay.

Framed original oil paintings of Seth Jermy, his wife Mary Jermy, and his son Seth were at Minehead Vicarage, Somerset, in 1963, the property of Mr Bennett, the vicar, descended from the Jermys through Mrs James Macaulay. Seth is shown with fair hair, hazel eyes, a white cravat and a rust coloured cloak. A signet ring is on the little finger of his left hand. Mary is shown with dark brown hair and hazel eyes. She is wearing a green dress with a flame-coloured cloak and a pearl earring. She is holding an orange blossom. According to tradition, Mary Jermy was painted in the gown which she wore when she had an audience with Queen Anne.
