= Paul Bishop =

Paul Bishop may refer to:

- Paul Bishop (police officer), American police officer and crime writer
- Paul Bishop (actor) (born 1966), Australian actor and politician
- Paul C. Bishop (born 1967), British scholar and William Jacks Chair in Modern Languages at the University of Glasgow
- Paul Bishop (rugby league) (born 1967), English rugby league footballer

== See also ==
- Bishop (surname)
- Paul Bishop Houses - 1842 townhouses built by Paul Bishop (née Levesque) in Toronto, Ontario, Canada
