= Home District Council =

The Home District Council was the municipal governing body for York, Upper Canada (now Toronto, Ontario) from 1792 to 1849. It was established by Lieutenant Governor of Ontario John Graves Simcoe.

The leader of the council was known as the Chairman of the General Quarter Session of Peace. By 1849 the role was replaced by the Warden of York County, Ontario.

The council first met in Newark at Navy Hall in 1792, then to York after 1793.

== Home District Council Chairmen ==
- Hon. William Jarvis Esq. (b. 1756, Stamford, Connecticut - d. 1817, York, Upper Canada) 1800–1811

Mr. Jarvis was also provincial secretary and registrar of deeds

- Hon. Thomas Ridout Esquire (b. 1754 Sherborne, England - d. 1829, York, Upper Canada) 1811–1829

Mr. Ridout was also Clerk of Peace of the Home District 1800–1811, Surveyor-General of Upper Canada

- William Allan Esquire JP (b. 1770, Huntley Aberdeenshire, England - d. 1853, Toronto, Province of Canada) 1829–1831
- Alexander Macdonell Esquire JP (b. 1762 Aberchalder, Scotland - d. 1842 Toronto, Province of Canada) 1831–1834
  - Mr. Macdonell was also Sheriff of the Home District, who was responsible for order in the town

== See also ==
- Toronto City Council - one of the succeeding bodies in 1834 and headed by Mayor of Toronto
- York Regional Council - from 1834 to 1970 as York County Council; headed by York Regional Chair, which replaced the Warden of York County 1850–1970)
