= Thomas Ridout (architect) =

Canadian architect (1828-1905)

- Born: October 17, 1828
- Died: July 3, 1905 (aged 76); Canada
- Occupations: Architect, engineer

Thomas Ridout (October 17, 1828 – July 3, 1905) was a Canadian architect and railway engineer.

== Personal ==
Ridout was the son of Upper Canada official and banker Thomas Gibbs Ridout and grandson of Surveyor General of Upper Canada Thomas Ridout.

== Career ==
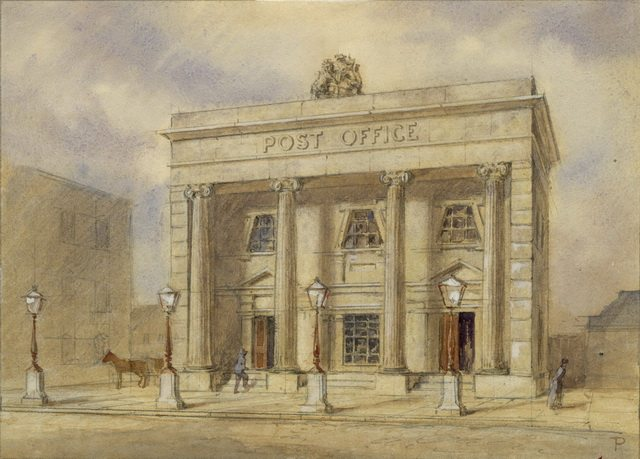
In 1851 Ridout's firm designed 10 Toronto Street, a celebrated former Post Office.

Ridout completed his training at King's College, London and returned to Toronto in 1850 to practice under a short-lived partnership of Cumberland and Ridout.

His architecture career was dim so with his family's influence left Toronto in 1852 to become assistant engineer with the Great Western Railway in Hamilton, Ontario, with a short-lived engineering practice with Sandford Fleming in 1857, and then to Ottawa, Ontario in 1875 with the Department of Railways and Canals.

Ridout died in Ottawa in 1905.

== Buildings built under Cumberland and Ridout ==
- Toronto Normal School 1851–1852 (demolished 1958–1963)
- Cathedral Church of St. James (Toronto) 1853
- Toronto Street Post Office 1853
- York County Courthouse 1853
