= John Ridout =

John Ridout (1799-1817), still a teenager when he died in 1817, died in a duel with Samuel Jarvis. Both Ridout and Jarvis were from the small circle of privileged insiders called upon by the Lieutenant Governors of Upper Canada, to fill administrative posts, and sinecures, that William Lyon Mackenzie would later brand the Family Compact. Ridout's father, Thomas Ridout, was Upper Canada's Surveyor General. Jarvis's father, William Jarvis, had been appointed Upper Canada's provincial secretary and registrar.

== Early life and military career ==
Ridout attended the District School, the first public school in York, in 1807.

During the War of 1812 Ridout enlisted as a midshipman on the Provincial Marine sloop Royal George. He was also a "confidential clerk" to his elder brother Thomas Gibbs Ridout, in the Army's Commissary Department.

== Duel and death ==
On July 5, 1817, Ridout was working at his brother's law office. Ridout visited the office of Samuel Jarvis where they entered an argument. The next Tuesday, Ridout and Jarvis met on the streets on York and had another argument. The next day Ridout attacked Jarvis with a bludgeon and they physically fought each other until it was stopped by the militia. In the following days, Ridout and Jarvis agreed to a duel.

The two men met at dawn, on July 12, 1817, at Elmsley's Farm north of York. The two were instructed to stand eight paces away from each other and fire on the count of three. Ridout fired early at two accidentally and missed. He approached Jarvis to apologise but was sent back to his place. It was agreed that Jarvis would fire a shot at an unarmed Ridout, which hit Ridout.

Ridout exclaimed that the shot was foul play but then forgave Jarvis for killing him and fainted. Jarvis and two others left him where he was while Ridout vomited blood. George Playter found Ridout who again exclaimed that he was shot in foul play. Ridout was taken to James Macaulay to seek medical attention but died outside Macaulay's home. His last words were reported to forgive Jarvis again, a plea for his mother not to grieve and a desire to meet his sister in heaven.

Ridout's autopsy concluded that Ridout was killed immediately by a shot to his shoulder, neck, jugular and windpipe. According to Mike Filey this was the last duel in York, the capital of Upper Canada.
