= Prideaux Selby =

Executive Council of Upper Canada for York
- In office 1808–1813

Auditor General of Land Patents for Upper Canada
- In office 1809–1813
- Preceded by: William Hallan
- Succeeded by: John McGill

Personal details
- Born: 21 December 1747 Alnwick, Northumberland, England
- Died: 9 May 1813 (aged 65) York, Upper Canada
- Spouse: Elizabeth m. 1772
- Children: Prideaux Selby Jr – son
- Occupation: military officer, public official

Prideaux Selby (baptised 21 December 1747 – 9 May 1813) was an English soldier and political figure in Upper Canada.

He was born in Alnwick, Northumberland, England a son of the Holy Island branch of the Selby family.

He joined the 5th Foot Regiment in Ireland in 1781, and arrived in Detroit with the regiment in 1790. In 1792, he was appointed assistant secretary of Indian Affairs by Lieutenant Governor John Graves Simcoe and took up residence in Amherstburg. In 1802, he became a justice of the peace in the Western District. In 1807, he moved to York (Toronto). In 1808, he was appointed to the Executive Council of Upper Canada and appointed receiver general. In 1809, he was also appointed auditor general.

In the spring of 1813, he became seriously ill and died in May of the same year.

He had married in England in about 1772. His son, also Prideaux Selby was born in London and ultimately inherited family estates at Swansfield House, Alnwick and Pawston, Northumberland.

Government offices
| Preceded by William Hallan | Auditor General of Land Patents for Upper Canada; 1809–1813 | Succeeded by John McGill |
