= King's Mill, Toronto =

King's Mill, Toronto, was a land lot (or land tract) with a 1,100 acres timber reserve established in 1793 by John Graves Simcoe to supply wood to build ships, material for government buildings in York (including Old Fort York). The reserve was bounded by Bloor Street, Humber River, The Queensway and Royal York Road. Shipbuilding of vessels on the Humber was not profitable and soon the mill became derelict.

Lot 6 (one of 9 lots) of the reserve south of Bloor on the west bank of the Humber was home to King's Saw Mill. The reserve and saw mill was leased to Thomas Fisher in 1821. Fisher retained rights to the Mill until the government leased to miller William Gamble in 1834. Fisher was given a 20 hectares lot in 1835 in what is now Lambton Mills. Gamble and others established milling here until the 1880s.

Between 1830 and 1850 the government of Upper Canada and later Canada West sold remaining parts of the reserve to buyers for use as farm land.

The northeast corner of the reserve was operating as a waste dump (Upper and Lower Riverwood Landfills from 1959 to 1964) today the site of the saw mill is home to King's Mill Park., as well some commercial and residential use.
