= Paul Bishop Houses =

Heritage building in Toronto, Canada

Coordinates: 43.6521°N 79.3683°W

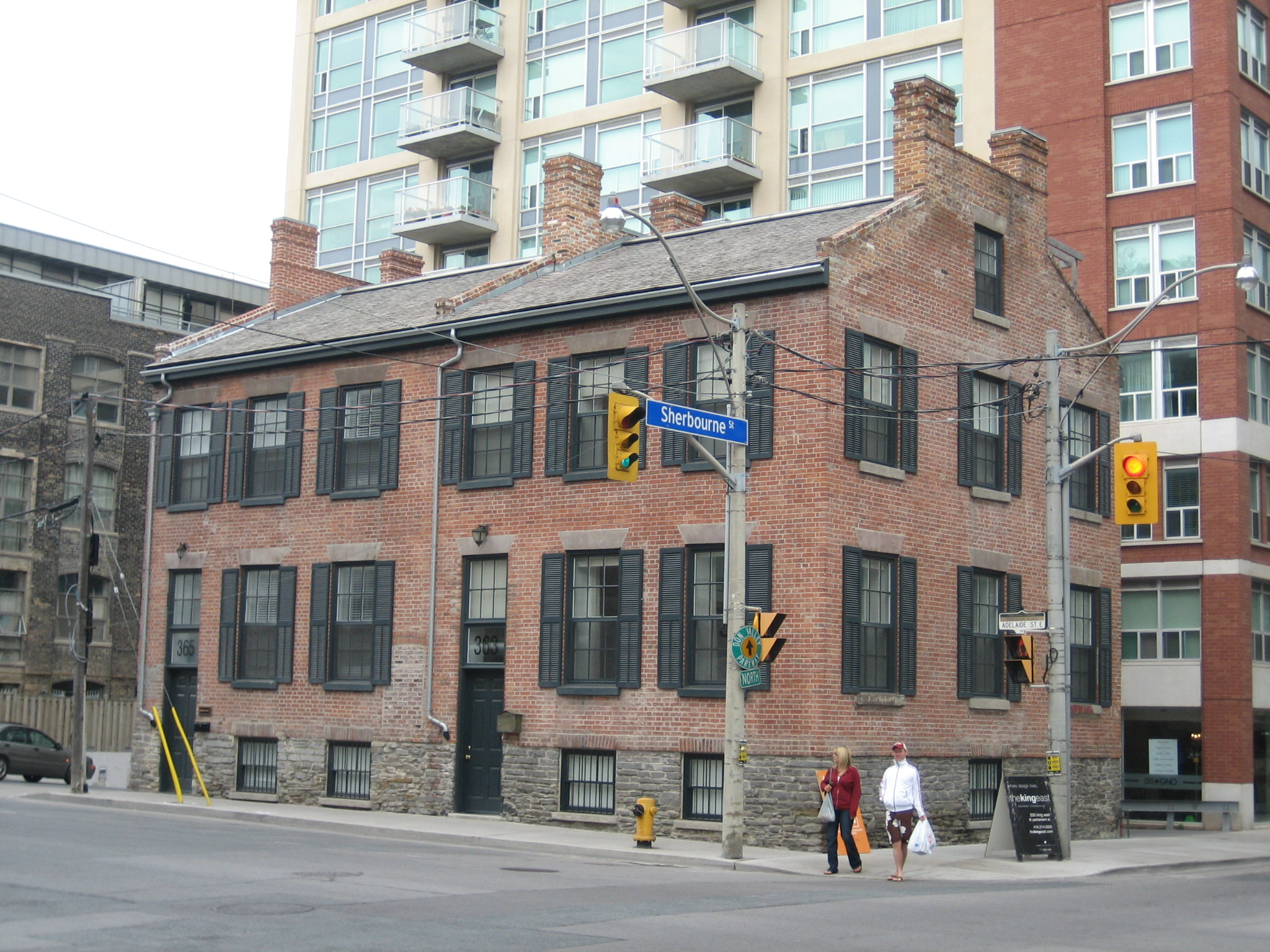
- Bishop Houses after restoration
- Interactive map of the Paul Bishop Houses area

General information
- Architectural style: Georgian
- Location: 363-365 Adelaide Street East, Toronto, Ontario, Canada
- Years built: 1842 (construction); 1872 (renovation); 2005-2006 (restoration)
- Owner: private

Ontario Heritage Act
- Type: Municipally designated
- Designated: December 17, 1998
- By-law No.: 895-1998

The Paul Bishop Houses are a pair of heritage Georgian townhouses located in the St. Lawrence neighbourhood of downtown Toronto, Ontario, Canada. The houses date to the 1840s, resting on foundations dating to the 1790s. The houses' exteriors were restored to their 1870s condition in the early 2000s, and their interiors renovated. The building is the oldest residential building in the original ten blocks of York, Upper Canada.

== Jarvis House ==
The houses, constructed in 1842 (also attributed to 1848) by blacksmith and wheelwright Paul Bishop (originally Paul Levesque), sit upon the foundations of a house laid by William Jarvis in 1798. Jarvis was a member of the Queen's Rifles and Provincial Secretary and Registrar of Upper Canada and was granted land. He selected a site at the southeast corner of Caroline (now Sherbourne) and Duke (now Adelaide) streets and constructed a 30 ft (9.1 m) by 41 ft (12 m) building of squared logs that he covered with clapboards which he named Jarvis House. The logs were cut on the spot. The 2 acres (0.81 ha) lot on the property also contained several outbuildings, including two barns, a stable, a chicken coop and a residence for the slaves that Jarvis owned. The house was considered to be the largest at the time in York.

Some time after William's death in 1817, his son Samuel Jarvis divided the two acres of land on which the house sat into smaller parcels and sold them. The house went through a series of owners and was expanded in the early 1820s. An Englishman named Lee operated an 'English chop house' and billiard room in part of the building. In the 1820s, James Padfield rented part of the house and ran a school until 1824. In 1824, it was bought by Isaac Columbus who used part of it as workshops and part as residence. One of Columbus' employees was Bishop, who would later buy the house.

It was sold in 1832 to James Kidd who converted it to a rooming house. During the cholera epidemics tin Toronto in the 1830s, several people living in the rooming house died. To prevent the disease from spreading, Kidd sealed several of their rooms. After the deaths in the house, it gained a reputation in the city as being haunted. During Kidd's occupancy of the home it was said that on several occasions unearthly noises were heard in the room Secretary Jarvis had used as an office. According to Robertson, one night a man named Baxter spent the night in the office room. At breakfast, he appeared "pale and haggard, and declared he would never pass another night in that room." Kidd moved out in 1837 and it remained vacant for a few years. Kidd himself moved to a new house on Jarvis Street, where he died in 1844.

== Bishop Houses ==
In 1841, Kidd sold the house to Bishop, whose business was located across the street on Duke. In his workshop in 1837, Bishop created Toronto's first horse-drawn cab based on a design presented to him by Thornton Blackburn. Blackburn operated his taxi business until 1860 and left a considerable fortune upon his death in 1890. His cabs were painted yellow and red, the colors now used by the Toronto Transit Commission.

Bishop demolished the old house and built two two-storey brick houses, laid on the old foundations. The houses are in the Georgian style with a stone-clad cellar partially above ground. The north facade of each house contained three symmetrical bays with stone lintels and sills framing the windows

According to John Ross Robertson's Landmarks of Toronto, Bishop acquired the property in 1848. However, historical records indicate that Bishop actually acquired the property in 1841, and had the new house buildings in place the following year. An 1842 map of Toronto, which shows the site as developed, also supports this date. Robertson describes Bishop as a French Canadian blacksmith and wheelwright who "was the principal workman in his trade in the town, but eventually he failed in business and left Toronto". Initially renting the property, Bishop resided on-site in 1843. The next year, he sold the property to Malachy O'Donohue, a local landowner. O'Donohue retained the site until 1846.

Condition of house in 1972

The houses survived the Great Fire of Toronto of 1849 and in 1860, came under the ownership of Thomas Dennie Harris. Harris died in 1872 and the property again underwent a series of changes. Nearby trees were removed and the small yard around the house was torn-up. The interior was gutted and during the next hundred years, the building served as a machine shop, garage and rooming house at various times. Windows were closed and new doors cut through the exterior walls.

The Bishop Houses were researched by the Toronto Historical Board, which recommended heritage designation. They were declared a historic property through City of Toronto By-law 895-1998 enacted on December 17, 1998, under the Ontario Heritage Act. At the time, the building had been vacant for an extended time and still bore the alterations made since 1872. These included a three-storey addition to the rear and addition of a gabled dormer on the roof.

In 2005-2006, as part of the Kings Court condominium building development, the three-story addition was removed, as well as 373 Adelaide Street to the east. Under the direction of du Toit Architects, the dormer was removed, and the exterior restored to its pre-1872 condition.

== See also ==
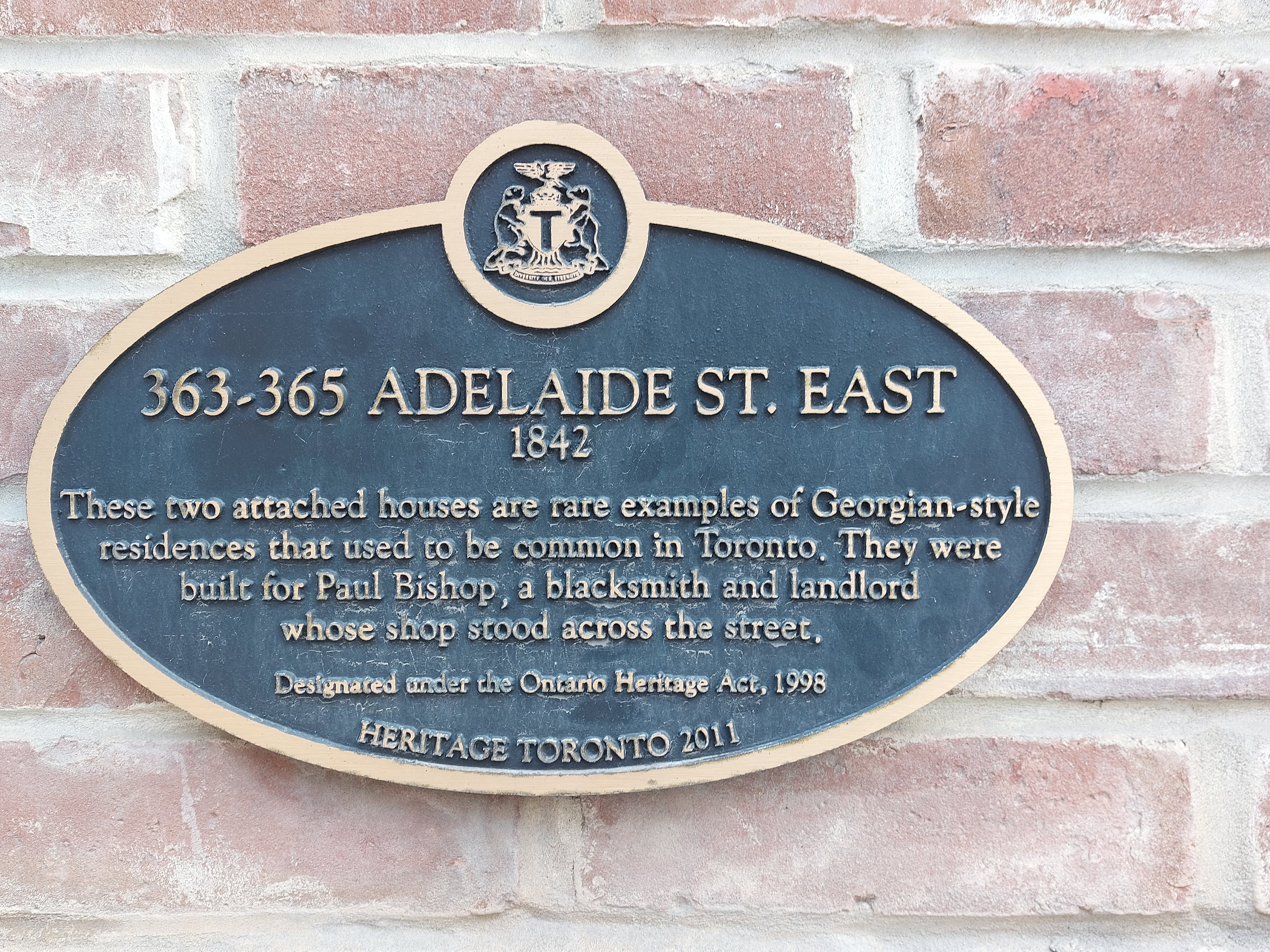
Heritage plaque for Bishop House

- List of oldest buildings and structures in Toronto
