= Thomas Ridout (politician) =

Canadian politician (1754-1829)

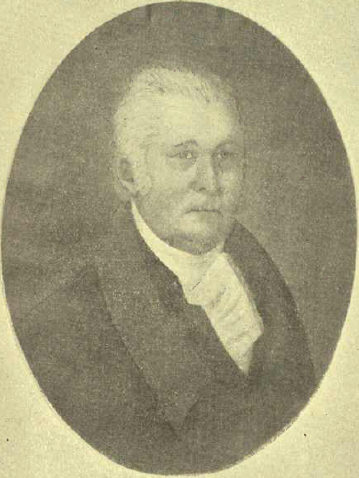
- Thomas Ridout
- Constituency: East York and Simcoe

Chairman of the Home District Council
- In office 1811–1829
- Preceded by: William Jarvis
- Succeeded by: William Allan

Interim Surveyor General of Upper Canada
- In office 1804–1805
- Preceded by: Sir David William Smith, 1st Baronet
- Succeeded by: Charles Burton Wyatt and Joseph Bouchette

Surveyor General of Upper Canada
- In office 1807–1829
- Preceded by: Charles Burton Wyatt and Joseph Bouchette
- Succeeded by: Peter Robinson as Commissioner of Crown Lands (Province of Canada) (held since 1827)

Personal details
- Born: March 17, 1754 Sherborne, England
- Died: February 8, 1829 (aged 74) York, Upper Canada
- Spouse: (1)Isabella(Donovan?) (2) Mary Campbell
- Children: Samuel Smith Ridout, George Ridout, John Ridout, and Thomas Gibbs Ridout
- Occupation: Politician

Thomas Ridout (March 17, 1754 – February 8, 1829) was a political figure in Upper Canada.

== Life and career ==
He was born in Sherborne, England, in 1754 and moved to Annapolis, Maryland in 1774. In 1787, he was travelling to Kentucky when his group was captured by a party of Shawnees; he was held captive and later released in Detroit, then held by the British. Ridout fled to Montreal instead of returning to Annapolis. He married the daughter of a Loyalist and settled with his family at Newark (Niagara-on-the-Lake).

Ridout started work in 1793 as clerk for the Surveyor-General of Upper Canada, moved to York in 1797 and then as interim Surveyor-General with William Chewett from 1804 to 1805. In 1810, he was appointed to the post of Surveyor-General for Upper Canada in 1807, replacing Charles Burton Wyatt and Joseph Bouchette. It was in that position that he came to know Elijah Bentley. He had also been named registrar for York County in 1796 and justice of the peace in the Home District in 1806 and Chairman of the Home District Council from 1811 to 1829. In 1812, he was elected to the Legislative Assembly of Upper Canada representing East York and Simcoe. He served on the board set up to deal with claims for compensation for losses sustained during the War of 1812. In 1825, he was named to the Legislative Council. In 1827, he was appointed to the first board of King's College.

He died in York (Toronto) in 1829. His sons, Samuel Smith Ridout (store keeper, militia soldier, Clerk of Surveyor General and Sheriff of York County), George Ridout (lawyer and judge), John Ridout and Thomas Gibbs Ridout, were also prominent members of Upper Canada society. His granddaughter, Matilda Ridout Edgar, was a historian and feminist. In 1890 she published Ten years of Upper Canada in peace and war, 1805–1815, an edited collection of letters between Ridout and his sons George and Thomas Gibbs. This is a valuable source of information about life in Toronto and about the battles of the War of 1812.

== Sources ==
- Breault, Erin (2014). "RIDOUT, MATILDA". Dictionary of Canadian Biography. Vol. 13. University of Toronto/Université Laval.
- Burns, Robert J. (1987). "RIDOUT, THOMAS". Dictionary of Canadian Biography. Vol. 6. University of Toronto/Université Laval.
- "Sketch of Lady Edgar's Life". Transaction No. 8. Women's Canadian Historical Society. 1914.

== Bibliography ==
- Jack Dwyer: Dorset Pioneers: The History Press: 2009: ISBN 978-0-7524-5346-0
