= Erik Peters =

Canadian accountant

Erik Peters, F.C.A., served as Auditor General of Ontario between 1993 and 2003.
