= Thomas Fisher (Upper Canada) =

Thomas Fisher (March 3, 1792 – July 23, 1874) was a road builder, land developer, Squire, and Etobicoke Township pioneer. He immigrated from Yorkshire and arrived in New York in 1819. He spent three years partly in the United States and partly in Upper Canada. He settled along the Humber River in 1822 and became a successful merchant-miller. His mill located at King's Mill was acquired in 1821.

Fisher married his wife in 1813. They had three sons and four daughters.

Fisher is the namesake of Thomas Fisher Rare Books Library. The Department of Rare Books and Special Collections and the University Archives didn't have a permanent home until 1973 when the Thomas Fisher Rare Book library was opened. Great-grandsons, Sidney and Charles Fisher, donated to the library their own collections of Shakespeare, various twentieth-century authors, and etchings of Wenceslaus Hollar.

Fisher was an inductee into the Etobicoke Hall of Fame, 1974.
