= Alexander Macdonell (politician) =

Canadian politician

Alexander Macdonell of Collachie

Chairman of the Home District Council
- In office 1831–1834
- Preceded by: William Allan
- Succeeded by: none

Personal details
- Born: 1762 Glengarry Estate, Aberchalder, Scotland
- Died: 18 March 1842 (aged 79–80) Toronto, United Provinces of Canada
- Occupation: Soldier, Politician

Alexander Macdonell of Collachie (1762 – March 18, 1842) was a soldier and political figure in Upper Canada.

He was born in Scotland in 1762 and arrived in the Mohawk Valley of New York with other members of his family, including his brother, Angus Macdonell of Collachie. He served with the Royal Highland Emigrant Regiment during the American Revolution. In 1781, he came to Canada and joined Butler's Rangers until the regiment was disbanded in 1784.

Macdonell moved to York (Toronto), where he served as a Sheriff for the Home District from 1792 to 1805. He was elected to the 3rd Parliament of Upper Canada representing Glengarry & Prescott, serving until 1816. He was speaker of the House from 1804 to 1808.

At the start of the War of 1812, he became a colonel in the militia. In 1813, he was taken prisoner at Niagara by the Americans. In 1815, on his release, he was made superintendent of the Settling Department.

From 1831 to 1834 he was Chairman of the Home District Council and the last to serve the post before Toronto City Council was formed in 1834. In addition he was the Sheriff for the Home District.

== Death ==
He died at Toronto on 18 March 1842.

Preceded by Sir David William Smith, 1st Baronet	Speaker of the Legislative Assembly of Upper Canada; 1805–1808	Succeeded by Samuel Street
Preceded by William Allan	Chairman of the Home District Council; 1831–1834	Succeeded by William Lyon Mackenzie as Mayor of Toronto
