= Auditor General of Ontario =

Canadian Provincial government accountability agency

- La vérificatrice générale de l'Ontario
- Incumbent; Shelley Spence since January 8th, 2024
- Reports to: Legislative Assembly of Ontario
- Appointer: Legislative Assembly of Ontario
- Term length: 10 years non-renewable
- Constituting instrument: Auditor General Act (R.S.O. 1990, c. A.35)
- Salary: $371,700/year (Equal to that of a senior deputy minister of the Public Service of Ontario)

Office of the Auditor General of Ontario
- Bureau du verificauteur general de l'Ontario

Agency overview
- Formed: 1869
- Headquarters: Toronto, Ontario, Canada
- Employees: 145
- Annual budget: $24.75 million (2020)
- Website: https://auditor.on.ca/

The auditor general of Ontario (French: vérificateur général de l'Ontario) is an independent officer of the Legislative Assembly of Ontario to aid accountability by conducting independent audits of Ontario provincial government operations. The office was created in 1869.

== Office ==
The auditor general is appointed by the Legislative Assembly of Ontario (formerly by the governor in Council) for a 10-year term. Removal of the auditor general requires approval by the legislature.

== History ==
The auditor's office was created in 1869.

Before 1886, the auditor's office was an adjunct of the Treasury Department. Since the passage of the 1886 Audit Act, the office has evolved (after the 1950 Audit Act) into an independent provincial agency. With the passage of the 1978 Audit Act (later renamed Auditor General Act in 2004), the auditor general no longer submits his or her findings to the provincial cabinet, but to the Speaker of the Legislative Assembly of Ontario (and thereby reports back to the legislature).

Following the abolition of the Office of the Environmental Commissioner of Ontario by the provincial government of Premier Doug Ford in 2019, responsibilities for the enforcement and administration of the Environmental Bill of Rights were transferred to the auditor general's office. Serving as an Assistant Auditor General, the first Commissioner of the Environment, Jerry V. DiMarco, was announced on July 8, 2019. Following his departure to the federal Office of the Auditor General, DiMarco was subsequently replaced by Tyler Schulz.

The office is based in Toronto, Ontario. The most recent auditors general are chartered accountants by profession, but early appointees did not necessarily have an accounting or audit background.

== List of auditors general of Ontario/provincial auditors ==
- William Cayley 1869–1878 – unofficial provincial auditor; lawyer and Inspector General of Accounts for Upper Canada
- Charles Sproule 1878–1905 – first official provincial auditor; worked as a clerk and bookkeeper in the Audit Branch
- James Clancy 1905–1920
- Gordon Brown 1920–1938 – worked up the ranks of the office as an audit clerk
- Harvey Cotnam BComm, CA 1938–1963 – first auditor with an accounting background
- George Spence BComm, CA, FCA 1963–1973
- William Groom FCA 1973
- Norman Scott FCA 1974–1981
- Douglas Archer FCA 1982–1991
- Jim Otterman, FCA 1992–1993
- Erik Peters CA 1993–2003
- Jim McCarter CA, MBA 2003–2013
- Bonnie Lysyk, MBA, CPA, CA, LPA 2013–2023
- Shelley Spence, CPA, CA, LPA 2024-

=== Auditor General of Land Patents ===
A separate office created in 1791 to ensure check land granting (or land patents) process in Upper Canada was adhering to the laws by other offices and departments (namely Provincial Secretary/Registrar or the Attorney General). The position was eliminated in 1835 and passed over to the Executive Council Office (later transferred to the Legislative Assembly).

Holders of the office:

- Peter Russell 1791–1808
- William Hallan 1808
- Prideaux Selby 1809–1813
- John McGill 1813–1818
- Stephen Heward 1818–1828
- D'Arcy Boulton 1828–1835
