= Etobicoke Hall of Fame =

Coordinates: 43.64365°N 79.56537°W

Etobicoke Hall of Fame is a civic hall of fame in Toronto, Ontario, Canada. It began as a project of Etobicoke, a borough of Metropolitan Toronto. Etobicoke is now part of the larger city of Toronto. The project has been continued by the City of Toronto government.

== Inductees ==
- Dr. A. Ann Curtin (1889-1977), 1974
- Thomas Fisher (1792-1874), 1974
- William Gamble (1805-1881), 1974
- Robert A. Given (b. 1924), 1974
- W. Earle Gordon (1891-1968), 1974
- Morfudd Harries (1903-1996), 1974
- Flt. Lt. David E. Hornell, VC (1910-1944), 1974
- Gus Ryder (1899-1991), 1974
- Robert Home Smith (1877-1935), 1974
- Reverend Canon Francis Treymayne, (1829-1919), 1974
- Gordon Sinclair (1900-1984), 1984
- Murray and Margaret Dryden (1911-2004, 1907-1985), 1986
- F. Edna Gardner (1904-1991), 1986
- Dr. J. Page Harshman (1916-1977), 1986
- Cliff Lumsdon (1931-1991), 1986
- Barry Gosse (1937-1988), 1987
- Geoffrey H. Wood (1896-1995), 1987
- Frederick T. James (1869-1949), 1988
- John Borden Hamilton, Q.C. (1913-2005), 1988
- Donald Strathdee (1931-1989), 1988
- Dr. Lap-Chee Tsui, 1989
- Alice Rycroft (1914-2015), 1990
- Sonny Thomson (1932-1993), 1990
- June Callwood (1924-2007), 1992
- John P. MacBeth (1921-1991), 1993
- James A. McNabb (1905-1995), 1996
- Vera Halhed (1914-1996), 1997
- Elizabeth "Betty" Coulter
- Marie Curtis (1912-2006)
- Stewart Davidson Sr. (1924-1985)
- Reverend Stewart B. East
- Howard P. Lowe (1914-1991)
- Nora Pownall (1925-2015)
- Kemp Scott (1914-2015), 1989
