= Cliff Lumsdon =

Canadian swimmer

Clifford Douglas "Cliff" Lumsdon Jr., CM OOnt (April 13, 1931 – August 31, 1991) was a Canadian world champion marathon swimmer.

From New Toronto, Lumsdon was coached by Gus Ryder at the Lakeshore Swimming Club. He turned professional when he was 16 and would later say that the only regret in his career was giving up his amateur status before the 1948 Summer Olympics. In 1949, at the age of 18, Lumsdon won the world marathon championship in Toronto, defeating 46 competitors in the annual 15-mile race at the Canadian National Exhibition. He won $6,300—$5,500 for winning the race and $800 for leading all laps and swimming the fastest lap. On the strength of that victory, he was awarded the Lou Marsh Trophy as Canada's top athlete of 1949.

Lumsdon went on to win four additional marathons at the CNE, including a 32-mile race along the Lake Ontario waterfront in 1955 (replacing a planned cross-lake competition). Lumsdon was the only one of 29 starters to complete the course—no other swimmer even made it to the half-way point. Lumsdon was accompanied for part of the race by his fiancée and by fellow Lakeshore swimmer Marilyn Bell, riding in a boat. Lumsdon won $15,000 for his victory, plus thousands more in bonus money.

After two second-place finishes in previous years, Lumsdon won the 26-mile Atlantic City marathon in 1956. On August 17 of that same year, he became the second swimmer to cross the Strait of Juan de Fuca in British Columbia. He retired in 1965 with career earnings of $152,000.

He coached his daughter, Kim Lumsdon—also a leading marathon swimmer—and accompanied her on her 1976 swim across Lake Ontario. He was inducted into Canada's Sports Hall of Fame in 1976, Etobicoke Hall of Fame in 1986, and made a Member of the Order of Canada in 1982. In March 1988, a park in Toronto was named Cliff Lumsdon Park in his honour. Lumsdon died in 1991 at age 60.

Cliff Lumsdon was inducted into the Ontario Sports Hall of Fame in 2009.

Throughout his career, Lumsdon's name was frequently misspelt as Lumsden.
