= William Gamble (business) =

Canadian businessman and pioneer

William Gamble (5 August 1805 – 20 March 1881) was a Canadian businessman and pioneer. He was the son of politician John Gamble and the brother of John William Gamble, and was born in Kingston, Upper Canada. He started a store in Toronto before becoming a miller in Etobicoke.

His business interests expanded to include a hotel, a distillery and shipping to transport his flour, as well as local crops, to Toronto. After 1835 he also became involved in developing Mimico and given right to King's Mill. He was active in building new roads and bridges, opening up territory for development. Flood damage by the Humber River in 1850, and the repeal of the British Corn Laws in 1849 (bringing a dramatic fall in the price of his flour) caused his milling business to collapse, but his reputation as a business leader endured and he was active in the foundation of the Bank of Toronto in 1855. The last remnants of his milling business fell out of his hands in 1862 when his mortgage was foreclosed, leaving him on the cusp of bankruptcy.

Gamble served as a director of the Bank of Upper Canada (appointed 1829), the York Board of Health (appointed 1833), and the British America Fire and Life Assurance Company (appointed 1834). In 1842, he was appointed as a Justice of the Peace. He was elected in 1850 to be the first reeve of the Township of Etobicoke. He also donated land for the creation of an Anglican church in Islington, St. George's-on-the-Hill, where he served as warden from 1846 to 1848 and from 1851 to 1852.

Gamble died in Toronto on 20 March 1881. He is a member of the Etobicoke Hall of Fame.

== Marriage ==
On 10 December 1833, Gamble married Elizabeth Bowles Brenchley. Together they had one daughter, Janice, born in 1838.
