= John McGill (politician) =

Canadian politician

Executive Council of Upper Canada for York
- In office 1796–1818

Inspector General of Upper Canada
- In office 1801–1813

Auditor General of Land Patents for Upper Canada
- In office 1813–1818
- Preceded by: Prideaux Selby
- Succeeded by: Stephen Heward

Personal details
- Born: March 1752 Auckland, Scotland
- Died: December 31, 1834 (aged 82) Toronto, Upper Canada
- Occupation: military officer, merchant

John McGill (March 1752 – December 31, 1834) was a Scottish born military officer and public official in Upper Canada. McGill is not related to James McGill, namesake of McGill University, who also had a brother named John McGill (1746-1797) who was a merchant in Montreal.

== Early life and military career ==
Born in Auckland, Scotland in 1752, McGill was deployed to Virginia in 1773 with the British Army as Lieutenant in the Queen’s Own Loyal Virginia Regiment (formed 1775 by Lord Dunmore in Norfolk, Virginia but disbanded in New York in 1776) and later merged into the Queen’s Ranger. After the American Revolution Captain McGill settled with his wife Catherine in Parrytown, New Brunswick (like due to the Regiment being relocated their in 1783) and finally York, Upper Canada in 1792.

At York McGill was Commissary of stores and provisions at Fort York and owned a large park lot of land.

== Political career ==
McGill became a member of the Executive Council of Upper Canada for York (1796–1818) and later served in the Legislative Council of Upper Canada (1797–1834). He was Inspector General of Upper Canada in 1801 and then appointed as Auditor General of Land Patents for Upper Canada (or also referred to as Receiver General) from 1813 to 1818.

== Personal ==
McGill and his wife Catherine died without living heirs (their daughter died in 1819). He passed down his estate and name to nephew Peter McGill, who changed his name as per request from McGill from Peter McCutcheon.

== Legacy ==
His estate home, McGill Cottage, was acquired by Peter McGill and later became McGill Square. His property (bounded by Bloor Street East, Mutual Street, Queen Street East and Bond Street) was sold in 1868. The site of his home is now the Metropolitan United Church (originally as Metropolitan Wesleyan Methodist Church) since 1872 and the rest of the land is of mix use and includes a number of key buildings and institutions:

- Ryerson University's Ryerson Square and Kerr Hall - former site of Toronto Normal School
- Mattamy Athletic Centre - formerly Maple Leaf Gardens
- St. Michael's Cathedral Basilica

A short east-west street on his former estate, McGill Street, along with McGill Parkette are named for him.

Government offices
Preceded by Prideaux Selby	Auditor General of Land Patents for Upper Canada; 1813–1818	Succeeded by Stephen Heward
