= Journal of Canadian Studies =

- Discipline: Canadian studies
- Language: English
- Edited by: Marian Brendin

Publication details
- History: 1966–present
- Publisher: University of Toronto Press (Canada)
- Frequency: Triannual

Standard abbreviations
- ISO 4: J. Can. Stud.

Indexing
- ISSN: 0021-9495 (print); 1911-0251 (web)
- LCCN: 79644299
- OCLC no.: 00816138

Links
- Journal homepage

The Journal of Canadian Studies (French: Revue d'études canadiennes) is a bilingual peer-reviewed academic journal dedicated to the interdisciplinary study of Canada. It is published three times a year by the University of Toronto Press.

== Abstracting and indexing ==
The journal is abstracted and indexed in:

- Academic Search Alumni Edition
- Academic Search Complete
- Academic Search Elite
- Academic Search Premier
- Academic Search Ultimate
- Advanced Placement Source
- America: History and Life
- America: History and Life with Full Text
- Arts & Humanities Citation Index
- Book Review Digest Plus
- Canadian Business
- CBCA Canadian Business & Current Affairs Database
- Canadian Periodical Index
- Canadian Points of View Reference Centre
- Canadian Reference Centre
- Current Contents
- Current Contents—Arts and Humanities
- Directory of Publishing Opportunities in Journals and Periodicals
- Humanities Abstracts
- Humanities Full Text
- Humanities International Complete
- Humanities International Index
- Humanities Source
- Humanities Source Ultimate
- International Security & Counter-Terrorism Reference Center
- International Bibliography of Book Reviews of Scholarly Literature on the Humanities and Social Sciences (IBR)
- International Bibliography of Periodical Literature on the Humanities and Social Sciences (IBZ)
- Literary Reference Center
- Literary Reference Center Main Edition
- Literary Reference Center Plus
- MLA International Bibliography
- MasterFILE Complete
- MasterFILE Elite
- MasterFILE Premier
- OmniFile Full Text Mega
- OmniFile Full Text Select
- Project MUSE
- Risk Management Reference Center
- Scopus
- The Standard Periodical Directory
