= East Creech =

Hamlet in Dorset, England

Coordinates: 50.6426°N 2.1030°W

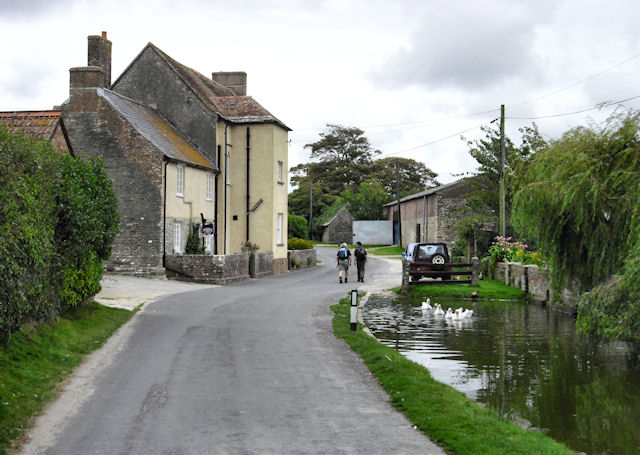
- East Creech Farm

- Location within Dorset
- OS grid reference: SY9282
- Unitary authority: Dorset
- Ceremonial county: Dorset
- Region: South West
- Country: England
- Sovereign state: United Kingdom
- Post town: WAREHAM
- Postcode district: BH20
- Dialling code: 01929
- Police: Dorset
- Fire: Dorset and Wiltshire
- Ambulance: South Western
- UK Parliament: South Dorset

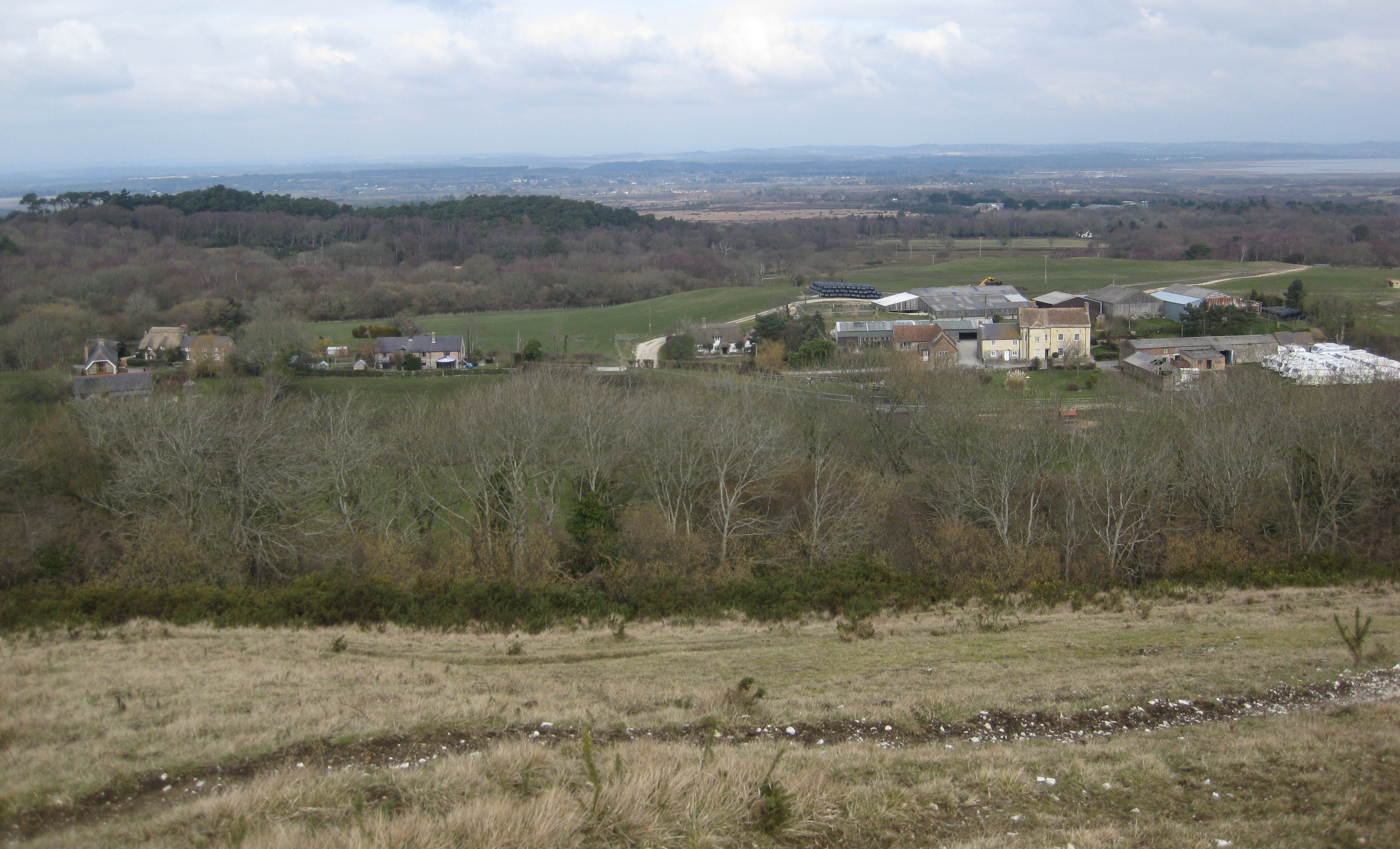
East Creech near Wareham

East Creech is a hamlet in the parish of Church Knowle in the county of Dorset, England.

East Creech lies at the northern foot of the Purbeck Hills about 3 kilometres west of Corfe Castle. It is located at Ordnance Survey grid reference SY9282. It also lies within the East Creech Conservation Area which was first designated in 1990.

In 1224, East Creech Manor was in the possession of Walter Le Franke. It passed down through his family to Mary Franke, who in 1637 married Edmund Hayter (d.1657) and the manor was transferred to him. It remained in the Hayter family until 1770, when Samuel Hayter (1736–1800) sold up and moved to Wareham Priory.
