= Natural aristocracy =

Concept in political philosophy

The natural aristocracy is a concept developed by Thomas Jefferson in 1813 which describes a political elite that derives its power from talent and virtue (or merit). He distinguishes this from traditional aristocracies, which he refers to as the artificial aristocracy, a ruling elite that derives its power solely from inherited status, or wealth and birth. Jefferson considers the natural aristocracy to be superior to the artificial aristocracy, and he believes the ideal ruler must come from the natural aristocracy. The natural aristocracy has been interpreted as being related to the concept of meritocracy.

== Precursors ==
Similar conceptions were developed in Ancient Greece, where both Plato and Aristotle advocated a form of government where only the wisest should rule.

== Natural and artificial aristocracy ==
The concept originated in 1813 during a correspondence between Thomas Jefferson and John Adams, who were both friends but also political rivals who held conflicting views on the proper role of government. Jefferson founded the liberal and populist Democratic-Republican Party, while Adams was a member of the conservative Federalist Party, which favored the interests of wealthy merchants and bankers and advocated for a more powerful national government. The two men were having a debate regarding the nature of aristocracy. Both despised the hereditary nobility found in traditional European monarchies, but they also agreed that there exists a naturally superior elite of people who are the most worthy to rule society. Adams believed the best rulers have great wealth, birth, genius, virtue, and beauty. He justifies this claim by arguing that people throughout history have always preferred these traits.

Jefferson agrees with Adams that only the best people should rule society, but he makes a distinction between rulers who belong to the natural aristocracy and rulers who belong to the artificial aristocracy. According to Jefferson, members of the natural aristocracy possess virtue and talents, while members of the artificial aristocracy only possess wealth and birth. He considers members of the natural aristocracy to be the most ideal rulers, and he believes the talents of a natural aristocrat can improve over time:

I agree with you that there is a natural aristocracy among men. The grounds of this are virtue and talents. Formerly bodily powers gave place among the aristoi. But since the invention of gunpowder has armed the weak as well as the strong with missile death, bodily strength, like beauty, good humor, politeness and other accomplishments, has become but an auxiliary ground of distinction. There is also an artificial aristocracy founded on wealth and birth, without either virtue or talents; for with these it would belong to the first class. The natural aristocracy I consider as the most precious gift of nature for the instruction, the trusts, and government of society.

Jefferson suggests that God created the natural aristocracy, and that the best governments allow the best men to rule:

And indeed it would have been inconsistent in creation to have formed man for the social state, and not to have provided virtue and wisdom enough to manage the concerns of the society. May we not even say that that form of government is the best which provides the most effectually for a pure selection of these natural aristoi into the offices of government? The artificial aristocracy is a mischievous ingredient in government, and provision should be made to prevent its ascendancy.

However, Adams argued that natural aristocracy corrupts into artificial aristocracy, stating:

Your distinction between natural and artificial Aristocracy does not appear to me well founded. Birth and Wealth are conferred on Some Men, as imperiously by Nature, as Genius, Strength or Beauty. The Heir to honours and Riches, and power has often no more merit in procuring these Advantages, than he has in obtaining an handsome face or an elegant figure. When Aristocracies, are established by human Laws and honour Wealth and Power are made hereditary by municipal Laws and political Institutions, then I acknowledge artificial Aristocracy to commence: but this never commences, till Corruption in Elections becomes dominant and uncontroulable. But this artificial Aristocracy can never last. The everlasting Envys, Jealousies, Rivalries and quarrells among them, their cruel rapacities upon the poor ignorant People their followers, compell these to Sett up Cæsar, a Demagogue to be a Monarch and Master, pour mettre chacun a sa place. Here you have the origin of all artificial Aristocracy, which is the origin of all Monarchy. And both artificial Aristocracy, and Monarchy, and civil, military, political and hierarchical Despotism, have all grown out of the natural Aristocracy of "Virtues and Talents." We, to be Sure, are far remote from this. Many hundred years must roll away before We Shall be corrupted.

Adams argued that "Education, wealth, strength, beauty, stature, birth, marriage, graceful attitudes and motions, gait, air, complexion, physiognomy, are talents, as well as genius and science and learning" and that even the most educated members of society would elect members for reasons other than true merit. He also thought that even the best men would succumb to temptation. Therefore, a good constitution must have protocols in place (such as checks and balances) to prevent rulers from becoming corrupted.

Jefferson believed this disagreement was the main purpose of his discussion with Adams, ending the debate with:

I have thus stated my opinion on a point on which we differ, not with a view to controversy, for we are both too old to change opinions which are the result of a long life of inquiry and reflection; but on the suggestion of a former letter of yours, that we ought not to die before we have explained ourselves to each other. We acted in perfect harmony thro' a long and perilous contest for our liberty and independence. A constitution has been acquired which, tho neither of us think perfect, yet both consider as competent to render our fellow-citizens the happiest and the securest on whom the sun has ever shone. If we do not think exactly alike as to its imperfections, it matters little to our country which, after devoting to it long lives of disinterested labor, we have delivered over to our successors in life, who will be able to take care of it, and of themselves.

== Identifying natural aristocrats ==
Jefferson believed a successful republic must identify natural aristocrats and train them to govern. He believed the "best geniuses" must be "raked from the rubbish annually" in educational institutions that nurture their talents. Examples of natural aristocrats include Alexander Hamilton and Benjamin Franklin, two Founding Fathers of the United States who came from impoverished and unprivileged backgrounds, yet through their own merit, were able to rise to become highly influential leaders in the American Revolution and the development of the United States. Jefferson's fondness for knowledge and education led him to establishing the University of Virginia in 1819. The development of IQ and SAT tests in the mid-20th century created an interest in objectively measuring the "talent" required of natural aristocrats. Harvard University president James B. Conant heavily popularized SAT tests, believing they could help create what he called "Jefferson's ideal" by allowing universities to transition towards a meritocratic admission system that would admit a socioeconomically diverse group of students from the natural aristocracy rather than favoring students on the basis of wealth and privilege.

== Talented tenth ==
In his 1903 essay titled The Talented Tenth, African-American sociologist and civil rights activist W.E.B. Du Bois argued that the African-American community could be uplifted by a natural aristocracy of African-Americans, which he referred to as the Talented Tenth. The "Talented Tenth" refers to the 10 percent of Black men that have cultivated the ability to become leaders by acquiring a classical education at colleges, and becoming directly involved in social change. He argued that "Negro colleges" would serve as institutions of "natural selection" that would allow the most talented few African-Americans to rise above the rest. In The Talented Tenth, Du Bois argues that these college-educated African-American men should sacrifice their personal interests and use their education to lead and better the African-American community.

He states in his essay:

The Negro race, like all races, is going to be saved by its exceptional men. The problem of education, then, among Negroes must first of all deal with the Talented Tenth; it is the problem of developing the Best of this race that they may guide the Mass away from the contamination and death of the Worst.
