= William Allan (banker) =

Canadian banker, businessman and politician (c. 1770 – 1853)

Chairman of the Home District Council
- In office 1829–1831
- Preceded by: Thomas Ridout
- Succeeded by: Alexander Macdonell
- Constituency: York, Upper Canada

Personal details
- Born: c.1770 Huntly, Scotland
- Died: July 11, 1853 Toronto, Province of Canada
- Party: Family Compact
- Spouse: Leah Tyrer Gamble
- Children: 11, including George W. Allan
- Occupation: Businessman and politician

William Allan, JP (c.1770 – July 11, 1853), was a Scottish Canadian banker, businessman and politician.

== Life and career ==
Allan was born at "the Moss", near Huntly, Scotland. He came to the British province of Quebec around 1787 under the auspices of family friend John Forsyth (of Forsyth, Richardson & Company), and he settled at Niagara a year later. In 1795, he moved to York (now Toronto) as the agent for Forsyth, Richardson & Company. In 1797, he opened a general store with Alexander Wood, later becoming sole owner.

In 1800, Allan was named a justice of the peace in the Home District and, in 1801, became the postmaster at York. During the War of 1812, he served as major in the York Militia and negotiated the terms of surrender when York was first captured by the American forces. His store was looted during this period. Allan also served as supplier to the British forces. He later served on the commission responsible for reviewing claims for losses during the war, including his own.

Allan served as an associated judge at the 1818 trial of several members of the North West Company charged with the murder of Governor Robert Semple after the Battle of Seven Oaks. In 1818, he became the agent for the Bank of Montreal at York. In 1821, he was part of the group that established the Bank of Upper Canada, and he was its first president (from 1822 to 1835).

During the Types Riot Allan watched from his property immediately east of the printing press, speaking with Stephen Heward. Multiple witnesses reported that Allan did not assist in ending the riots and recognised some of the perpetrators.

Allan also served as a director of the Canada Company, which was formed to develop and sell property within the province. In 1834, he became governor of the British America Fire and Life Assurance Company. From 1829 to 1831, he was chairman of the Home District Council.

Allan was a friend of the Reverend John Strachan, and his close connections to the Family Compact led to an appointment on the Legislative Council in 1825. He became the first president of the Toronto Board of Trade in 1834. In 1836, he was named to the Executive Council for the province after the existing council resigned en masse to protest new Lieutenant Governor Francis Bond Head's autocratic style of government. Allan retired from the two councils after the union of Upper and Lower Canada in 1841.

Allan died in Toronto in 1853. His one surviving son, George William Allan, would become mayor of Toronto and a senator.
