= Thomas Gibbs Ridout =

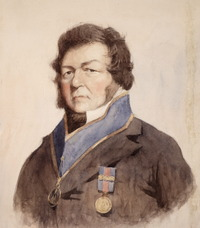
- Born: October 10, 1792; Sorel, Lower Canada, British Empire
- Died: July 29, 1861 (aged 68); Toronto, Province of Canada, British Empire
- Occupations: army officer, banker
- Known for: First General Manager of the Bank of Upper Canada

Thomas Gibbs Ridout was a member of the small circle of privileged insiders who Lieutenant Governors of Upper Canada appointed to hold administrative posts and sinecures. His father, Thomas Ridout, was Surveyor General of Upper Canada.

Initially, during the War of 1812, Ridout served as a Lieutenant in the 3rd Regiment of Foot. However, he was soon transferred to the Commissary department, rising to Deputy Assistant Commissary General. In these positions he was a senior purchasing officer for British Army, in Upper Canada. He held this lucrative post after the war, until 1820, when he was appointed First Cashier (i.e. General Manager) of the new Bank of Upper Canada.

During the War he appointed his 14 year old younger brother John Ridout as his confidential clerk.

His son Thomas Ridout (1828–1905) was an architect.
