= Stephen Heward =

Upper Canada public official

Auditor General of Land Patents for Upper Canada
- In office 1818–1828
- Preceded by: John McGill
- Succeeded by: D'Arcy Boulton

Personal details
- Born: 1777? Cumberland, England
- Died: 1828 York, Upper Canada??
- Spouse(s): Mary Robinson(1787- 1863), m. 1806
- Relations: George Crookshank - son-in-law
- Occupation: Military officer, public official

Stephen Heward was a military officer and public official in Canada, serving from 1811 until his death in 1828. Like many early officials in Canada little is known of Stephen Heward beyond his roles as a public official in Upper Canada after serving earlier in the British Army.

Before and during his posting as Auditor General of Land Patents Heward held a number of posts:

- Clerk of the Peace for the Home District 1811-1828?
- Clerk of the Receiver General's Office 1815-1828
- Registrar General of the Court of Probate 1816-1828
- District Court Clerk for the Home District 1818-1828

Heward served during the War of 1812 as Captain in the 3rd York Militia and promoted as Major at end of the conflict. For his military service he obtained land in Simcoe County.

He is also known for his inaction during the Types Riot, which led to other bystanders not intervening.

== Legacy ==
Heward Avenue in Toronto named for him.
