= John William Gamble =

Canadian politician

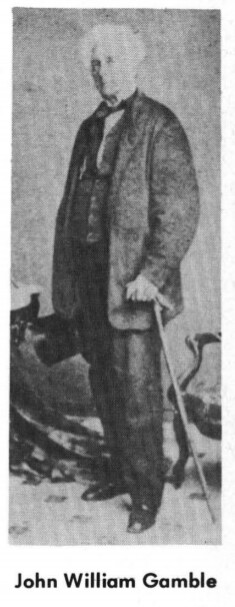
- Born: July 5, 1799; Kingston, Upper Canada
- Died: December 12, 1873 (aged 74); Pine Grove, Ontario
- Occupation: politician

John William Gamble (July 5, 1799 – December 12, 1873) was a businessman and political figure in Upper Canada and Canada West.

He was born in York, Upper Canada (now Toronto) in 1799 and grew up in Kingston. He was the son of John Gamble (1755–1811), a Loyalist surgeon with the Queen's Rangers. His mother, Isabella Elizabeth Clarke (25 October 1757 – 9 March 1859), was the daughter of Dr. Joseph Clarke, also a Loyalist – who was thus persecuted, and whose brother, Dr. Nehemiah Clarke (c. 1739 – 1825), was tortured by a rebel mob in February 1774.

Gamble operated a store with his brother William. Gamble settled in Etobicoke Township, but later moved to Pine Grove in Vaughan Township, where he set up a grist mill, a distillery and cloth factory. He served 14 terms as reeve for the township. He also served as justice of the peace in the Home District and served in the local militia. In 1838, he was elected in 1st York to the Legislative Assembly of Upper Canada. He opposed the Union of the two Canadas in 1841, but later represented South York in the Legislative Assembly of the Province of Canada from 1851 to 1857. Originally supporting free trade, he later opposed reciprocity in trade with the United States.

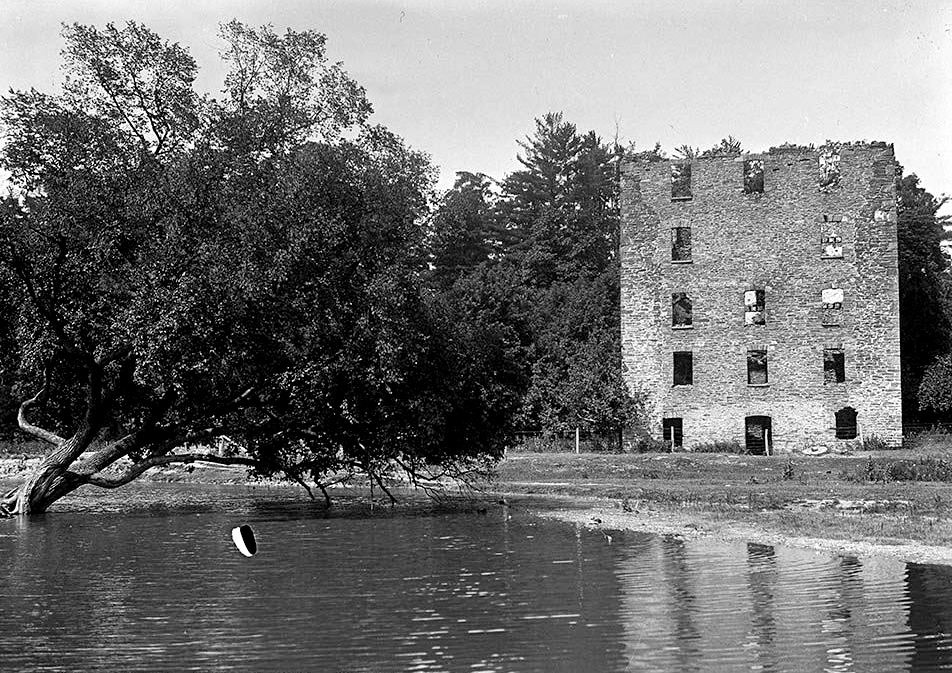
Gamble's mill is now known simply as the Old Mill.

Gamble acquired the mill, located on the Humber River, just north of Bloor Street, in 1828. Around it he built a lumber yard and nail factory. The original wooden structure burned down in 1848, and Gamble replaced it with an impressive five story stone mill. At the time the mill was known as Gamble's Mill. The impressive ruins, visible from the Toronto Transit Commission's Old Mill subway station, are the last trace of a series of mills on the Humber, is now known simply as the Old Mill.

He died in Pine Grove in 1873.
