= Samuel Jarvis =

Canadian government official

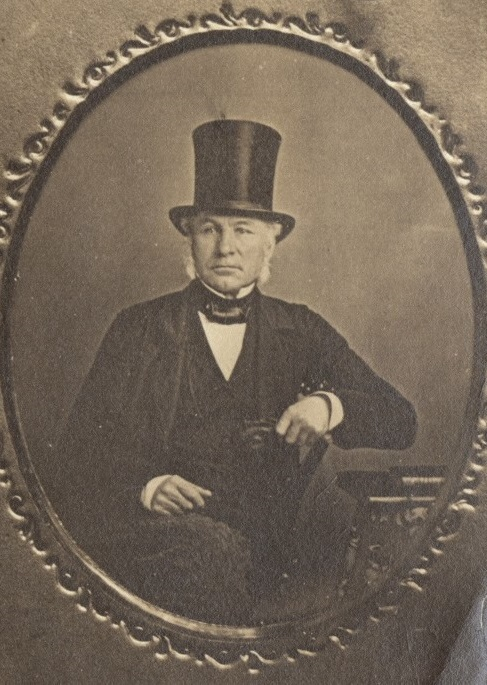
Samuel Peters Jarvis, 1850s

Samuel Peters Jarvis (November 15, 1792 – September 6, 1857) was a Canadian government official in the nineteenth century. He was the Chief Superintendent for the Indian Department in Upper Canada (1837–1845), and he was a member of the Family Compact. He survived the last duel held in York, Upper Canada (now Toronto).

== Life and career ==
Jarvis was born to William Jarvis and Hannah Owens Peters in Newark, Upper Canada. He moved with his family to York, (Toronto) Upper Canada, in 1798. In 1807 he attended the grammar school of John Strachan in Cornwall, Ontario.

Jarvis was a member of the 3rd Regiment of York Militia during the War of 1812, seeing action at the Battle of Detroit and the Battle of Queenston Heights under Isaac Brock, and later action in the Battle of Stoney Creek and Battle of Lundy's Lane. In 1814 he received two positions in the government of Upper Canada, Assistant Secretary, and Registrar of Upper Canada.

Jarvis was also appointed as a Clerk of the Legislative Council of Upper Canada. Having studied law before the war, he was called to the bar in 1815. In 1817 he was named Clerk of the Crown in Chancery.

In the fall of 1815, Jarvis escorted his sister Eliza and Sarah Ridout to their boarding school in Quebec. Thomas Gibbs Ridout, who was living in Quebec at the time, paid for various supplies for Eliza and a year later accused Jarvis of owing him £100. Sam refuted this, asking the Ridout family to withdraw their accusation or accept a duel. John Strachan convinced Jarvis to withdraw his invitation to duel and the Ridout family to write a letter saying they misunderstood Thomas Ridout's version of events.

== Duel with John Ridout ==
In 1817, John Ridout was working as a clerk in his brother's law practice and visited Jarvis's office in relation to legal business. Their conversation became heated and Ridout left in an angered state. The following Tuesday the two men argued again on the streets of Toronto. The next day Ridout attacked Jarvis with a bludgeon and militia had to stop the fight between the two men.

Over the next few days, the two men agreed to a duel. They met on July 12 at daybreak at Elmsley's farm, located near Yonge Street north of York. The pair stood back to back, then took eight steps, turned to face each other, after which Jarvis's second Henry John Boulton began counting to three. Ridout misheard the count and prematurely fired on "two". Jarvis was livid at this violation of the agreement and after their seconds conferred Jarvis was allowed to take his shot, which killed Ridout. Jarvis was arrested that day charged with murder. Jarvis was acquitted, as all the formalities of a duel had been met, and the unspoken practice of the day was to acquit duellers. It was the last such quasi-legal duel in Toronto.

== Later life ==
In October 1818, Jarvis married Mary Boyles Powell, the daughter of William Dummer Powell who had presided over his trial for the shooting of John Ridout. Around 1822 Jarvis moved onto land which he had inherited from his father, Hazel Burn, a 100-acre (0.40 km^{2}) lot between Queen Street and Bloor Street. He cleared the southern part of the lot and erected an estate.

On June 8, 1826, Jarvis and fourteen others, disguised as Indians, broke into the offices of William Lyon Mackenzie's newspaper Colonial Advocate, where they smashed his printing press and threw it into Toronto Harbour. This act was in retaliation for negative editorials which Mackenzie had run about members of the Family Compact. Mackenzie sued and won £625, which was paid by donations from the Family Compact, and Mackenzie was able to set up a larger operation.

Jarvis was named Chief Superintendent of Indian Affairs for Upper Canada in 1837, replacing James Givins. During the Rebellion of 1837, Jarvis organised a group of volunteers to fight on the government's side; the group was named the Queen's Rangers in honour of his father's old unit, also called the Queen's Rangers, which had disbanded in 1802.

In 1845, he was removed from his position as Chief Superintendent of Indian Affairs for Upper Canada. A three-man commission appointed to investigate complaints about the Department of Indian Affairs found substantial problems there. Witnesses to the commission testified about occurrences of bribery, fraud, religious discrimination and lack of interest in the welfare of the Indians under its supervision. To repay the government the money he had stolen from the Indian Department, Jarvis was forced to sell Hazel Burn to pay the £4000 that he owed the government. The estate was divided into town lots with a street through the tract. The street is now named Jarvis Street.

Jarvis and his wife had several children. A son, Samuel Peters Jarvis Jr. CMG (1820–1905), was a British Army officer (Major General) who served in South Africa and died in England.
