= Wareham Priory =

Monastery in Dorset, England

Coordinates: 50.684135°N 2.107525°W

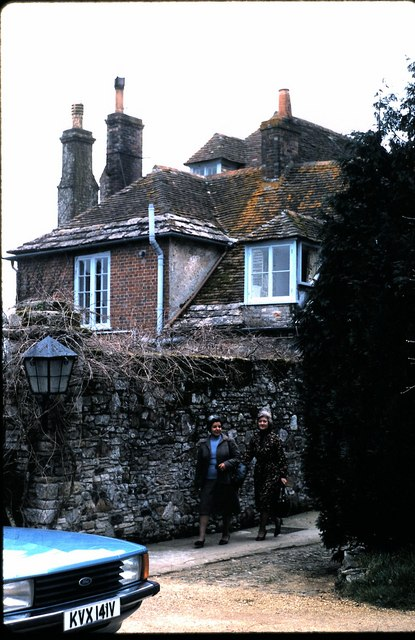
Priory House

Wareham Priory was a monastery in Wareham, Dorset, England.

A nunnery was founded on the site by the Saxons, possibly in 672, and dispersed during the Danish raids on Wareham in 876. It was refounded in 915 by Elfleda and probably dissolved in 998.

A Benedictine priory, a dependency of Lyre Abbey in Normandy, was founded in the early 12th century on the same site. It was suppressed in 1414 as an alien priory, and along with most of the other former possessions of Lyre Abbey was granted by Henry V to the Carthusians of Sheen Priory which he had founded. This house was seized by the Crown in 1539.

The site is now occupied by the Priory House, dating mostly from the early 16th century, with a few possibly earlier remains, and operating since the late 1970s as The Priory Hotel.
