= William Jarvis (Upper Canada official) =

Early Canadian civil servant

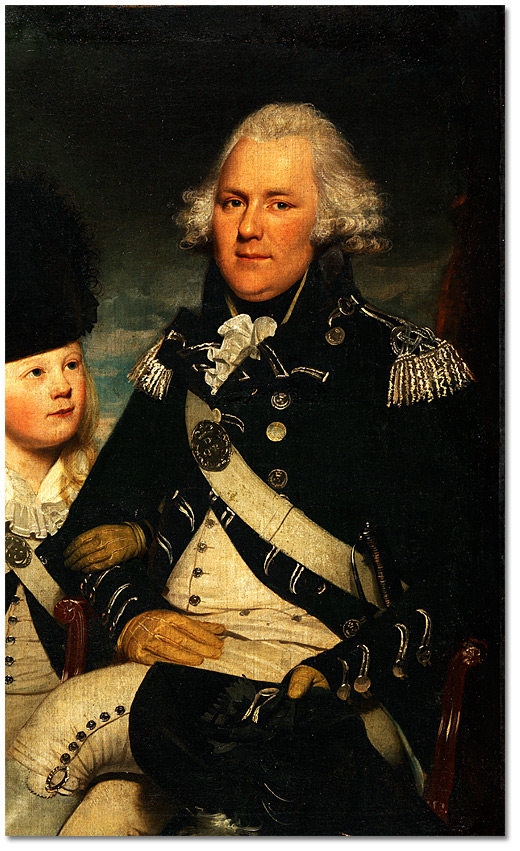
- William Jarvis (1756–1817)

Provincial Secretary of Upper Canada
- In office 1791–1817
- Preceded by: None
- Succeeded by: Sir John Robinson

Personal details
- Born: September 11, 1756 Stamford, Connecticut
- Died: August 13, 1817 (aged 60) York, Upper Canada
- Spouse: Hannah Owen Peters (1762–1845)
- Children: Samuel Peters Jarvis (1787–1792); Maria Lavinia Jarvis (1788–1826); Augusta Honoria Jarvis, 1790–1848); Samuel Peters Jarvis (1792–1857); William Munson Jarvis (1793–1867); Hannah Owen Jarvis (1797–1888); Ann Elizabeth Jarvis (1801–1865)
- Occupation: Civil Servant

William Jarvis (September 11, 1756 – August 13, 1817) was a civil servant, militia officer, and the Connecticut-born head of the Jarvis family in what is now Toronto, Ontario, Canada.

== Life and career ==
Jarvis was born in Stamford, Connecticut, to Samuel Jarvis, who was the town's clerk, and Martha Seymour.

William Jarvis joined John Graves Simcoe’s Queen's Rangers in 1777. He was wounded at the Battle of Spencer's Ordinary, in Virginia, in 1781 and was commissioned cornet in late 1782. At the cessation of the American Revolutionary War he went on half-pay and attempted to return to Connecticut, however, hostility to the Loyalists remained strong, and after an encounter with angry Patriots, he fled to England. In 1791, Simcoe, who had been appointed as the first Lieutenant Governor of Upper Canada, recommended Jarvis to the Home Secretary, Henry Dundas, for the positions of Provincial Secretary and Clerk of the Executive Council of the newly established province. Jarvis was instead given the positions of Provincial Secretary and Registrar.

Jarvis arrived in Canada with his wife and three children in 1792 and settled in Newark (now Niagara-on-the-Lake). When Simcoe moved the capital from Newark to York, Jarvis reluctantly followed. In York, he was granted a town lot and a 100 acres (40 ha) park lot west of George Street. Jarvis built his home on the town lot at Duke (Adelaide) and Caroline (Sherbourne), while the park lot was left largely undeveloped.

Jarvis was appointed deputy lieutenant of York County in 1794 and served as a colonel in the York Militia. He was appointed a magistrate in 1800, and between 1801 and 1806 served as chairperson of the General Quarter Sessions of the Peace.

As Provincial Secretary and Registrar his salary was supplemented by the fees collected when land patents were granted, however, half of this income was later transferred to the attorney general.

A plaque for a stained-glass window honouring William Jarvis at the Cathedral Church of St. James (Toronto) states, "First Provincial Grand Master of the Ancient Order of Free and Accepted Masons". Jarvis had become a mason while in England, and before leaving for Canada, had been appointed Provincial Grand Master of Masons in Upper Canada.

William and his wife Hannah Jarvis were slave owners who objected to Simcoe's plan to abolish slavery in Upper Canada. In a letter to her father, Hannah incorrectly claimed that Simcoe "has by a piece of chicanery freed all the negroes." One of their slaves, Henry Lewis, escaped and made his way to Schenectady, New York, where he wrote to Jarvis, offering to buy his freedom.

His son Samuel would eventually sub-divide the park lot and establish what is now called Jarvis Street.

== Personal life ==
Jarvis was married to Hannah Owen Peters, daughter of the Reverend Samuel Peters of Hebron, Connecticut. They had seven children. Their oldest son, Samuel, died in 1792 at the age of five. Their next born son, Samuel Jarvis, was named after his brother and became a prominent member of the Family Compact.
