= Land Titles Building =

Land Titles Building may refer to:

== Canada ==
- Alberta
  - Land Titles Building – Victoria Armoury (Edmonton)
- Saskatchewan
  - Land Titles Building (Arcola)
  - Land Titles Building (Moose Jaw)
  - Land Titles Building (Prince Albert)
  - Land Titles Building (Saskatoon)
