= Gerald McLellan =

Ombudsman
- In office 1987–1994

Personal details
- Profession: Lawyer

Gerald Peter McLellan (1932-2009) was an Ombudsman in the Province of Saskatchewan, notable during his tenure for his report on the collapse of the Principal Group.

== History ==
Gerald McLellan was born March 9, 1932, in the town of Arcola, Saskatchewan. Following completion of primary and secondary school in Arcola, McLellan attended the University of Saskatchewan, where he obtained degrees in commerce and law. McLellan was in private practice for many years in Estevan, Saskatchewan, subsequent to a period as in-house counsel for Co-operators Insurance in Regina. He was an elected Bencher of the Law Society of Saskatchewan from 1976 to 1982, while practising in Estevan, during which time he was also elected as a Trustee of the Estevan Board of Education.

In 1987, he was appointed by the Progressive Conservative government of Saskatchewan to the position of Ombudsman of Saskatchewan. He held the position he until 1993, under the New Democratic Party government of Saskatchewan, which had formed government following the 1991 provincial election. He was the third such appointee to the Office, which was established in 1973, and succeeded David A. Ticknell, who had served from 1977 to 1987. McLellan was in turn succeeded by Barbara J. Tomkins, who served from 1994 to 2004.

In 1989, McLellan issued the Special Report On The Regulation of FIC Ltd. and AIC Ltd. By The Saskatchewan Superintendent of Insurance (The Principal Investigation) in relation to the collapse of the Principal Group and the effect of such collapse on the estimated 5,000 Saskatchewan investors who lost money. McLellan recommended a degree of government compensation to such investors, based on findings as to deficiencies in regulatory oversight. His conclusion was that there was "a moral imperative on the Government of Saskatchewan to offer appropriate compensation to the investment contract holders in this Province." The recommendation was ultimately followed, notwithstanding an earlier government position that no compensation would be paid, based on a view that the primary regulator, the Province of Alberta, should be responsible for paying compensation to all investors. Shortly following the release of McLellan's report, the Saskatchewan government publicly expressed its inclination to follow the general recommendation to compensate investors, but then reversed itself, resulting in a class action by a number of such investors.

Subsequent to the completion of his term as Ombudsman, McLellan remained in Regina, in retirement. He died of cancer in Regina, on January 5, 2009.
