= Storey and Van Egmond =

Canadian architectural practice

Practice information
- Key architects: Edgar M. Storey; William Gysbert Van Egmond
- Founded: 1907
- Dissolved: 1924
- Location: Regina, Saskatchewan

Significant works and honors
- Buildings: Battleford Court House (Battleford, Saskatchewan); Land Titles Building (Saskatoon); Saskatoon Collegiate Institute (now Nutana Collegiate) (Saskatoon)

Storey and Van Egmond was an architectural partnership in Regina, Saskatchewan, Canada, that functioned from 1907 to 1924. Initially, the principals were Edgar M. Storey (1863-1913) and William Gysbert Van Egmond (1883-1949).

== Edgar M. Storey ==
Edgar M. Storey (1863-1913) was born in Cherry Valley, Prince Edward County, Ontario on September 16, 1863. He worked in the office of R. P. White in Brooklyn, New York, from 1880 to approximately 1893. During his time in Brooklyn, he married Phoebe Laturney of Kingston, Ontario.

He left Brooklyn to begin his own practice in Kingston, Ontario in approximately 1893. In 1905 or 1906, he moved to Regina where he practiced architecture with his son Stanley. In 1906, he hired William Van Egmond as a drafter. Edgar Storey died in Regina on August 24, 1913.

== William Gysbert Van Egmond ==
William Gysbert Van Egmond (1883-1949), known by the nickname "Van", was born September 16, 1883, in Egmondville, Ontario. After moving to Toronto, he attended the Beaux Arts School and later worked as a drafter for the Toronto firm of Gowinlock (Gouinlock?) and Baker. (Sources vary in their spelling.)

Van Egmond worked for a few years as a drafter in New York City. In January 1906 he married Mabel Isabel Ball of Toronto, and the couple moved to Regina. For a few months, Van Egmond managed the Regina branch office for Saskatoon-based architect Walter W. LaChance. LaChance was notorious for having a difficult personality, and it is not surprising that the employment relationship was short-lived. Later that same year, Van Egmond changed jobs to work for Edgar Storey.

The following year, in 1907, Van Egmond was elevated to partner, creating the firm of Storey and Van Egmond. Over the coming years, a long-term rivalry developed between Storey and Van Egmond, on one hand, versus Van Egmond's old employer, Walter LaChance, as they often competed for government contracts.

The January 1915 issue of the trade magazine, Construction, was devoted to the city of Regina. In it, Van Egmond authored a lengthy article titled "Public Buildings at Regina", highlighting many of his firm's buildings as well as those of other firms. An earlier article in the same magazine, from 1909, "Regina the Model City of the West" is very similar in emphasizing Storey and Van Egmond's work. This 1909 article does not list an author, but it was likely either written by Van Egmond or written with his close cooperation.

Van Egmond died of a heart attack on October 9, 1949, during an automobile trip from Stoughton, Saskatchewan to Regina.

== Successor firms ==
After Edgar Storey's death in 1913, Van Egmond continued to operate under the firm's name, Storey and Van Egmond, until 1924.

The firm often collaborated with Ernest E. Poole, founder of Poole Construction Limited (PCL), in Regina and southern Saskatchewan communities.

After 1924, the firm was reconstituted as Van Egmond and Storey, a partnership between Van Egmond and Storey's son, Stanley Edgar Storey (1888-1959).

In 1949, due to Van Egmond's death, the firm was reconstituted as Storey and Marvin (Stanley Storey and Wendell E. Marvin). After Stanley Storey died in 1959, Wendell Marvin continued to practice architecture as a solo practitioner while retaining the name Storey and Marvin.

In 1965, the firm Marvin and Vanstone was created, of which the principals were Wendell E. Marvin and Alan Vanstone (1920-1982).

== Notable commissions ==
All are extant unless otherwise specified. In chronological order:

=== Storey and Van Egmond (1907-1924) ===
- King's Hotel (1907, demolished), 1756 Scarth Street, Regina. Demolished in 1978 for Cornwall Centre.
- Old Court House, Saskatoon (1907, demolished), Third Avenue and 21st Street East, Saskatoon.
- Battleford Court House (1907-1909), 291 23rd Street, Battleford, Saskatchewan. This is a National Historical Site and Provincial Heritage Property.
- Land Titles Building (Saskatoon) (1909-1910), 311 21st Street East, Saskatoon. The structure is a Provincial Heritage Property.
- Land Titles Building (Moose Jaw) (1910), 76 Fairford Street West, Moose Jaw, Saskatchewan. A Provincial Heritage Property.
- Melville Town Hall (1910), 430 Main Street, Melville, Saskatchewan. This is a Provincial Heritage Property and a Municipal Heritage Property.
- Saskatoon Collegiate Institute (1910), 411 11th Street East at Victoria Avenue, Saskatoon. Now known as Nutana Collegiate.
- Credit Foncier (1911), 1870 Cornwall Street at 12th Avenue, Regina. Now used for law offices.
- Land Titles Building (Arcola) (1912), 301 Main Street, Arcola, Saskatchewan. A Provincial Heritage Property.
- Eddy Apartments (1912), 1901 14th Avenue at Rose Street, Regina. Now known as Hampton House Apartments. Designated a Municipal Heritage Property.
- Normal School (1913), 1831 College Avenue, Regina. Sources differ as to whether the date was 1912 or 1913. Now Canada Saskatchewan Production Studios.
- Craik Town Hall (1913), 1st Avenue and 3rd Street, Craik, Saskatchewan. Designated as a Municipal Heritage Property.
- Bartleman Apartments (1914), 2212 Cornwall Street, Regina. Designated as a Municipal Heritage Property.

=== Van Egmond and Storey (1925-1949) ===
- Doll’s House, also known as Isabelle Lockhart Residence (1928), 2812 McCallum Avenue, Regina. Built for Van Egmond's daughter; designated a Municipal Heritage Property.
- Weston Bakery Building (1929), 1377 Hamilton Street, Regina. City of Regina intends to pass a bylaw to designate as a Municipal Heritage Property.
- Balfour Apartments (1930), 2305 Victoria Avenue at Lorne Street, Regina. Designated as both a Municipal and a Provincial Heritage Property.

== Gallery ==
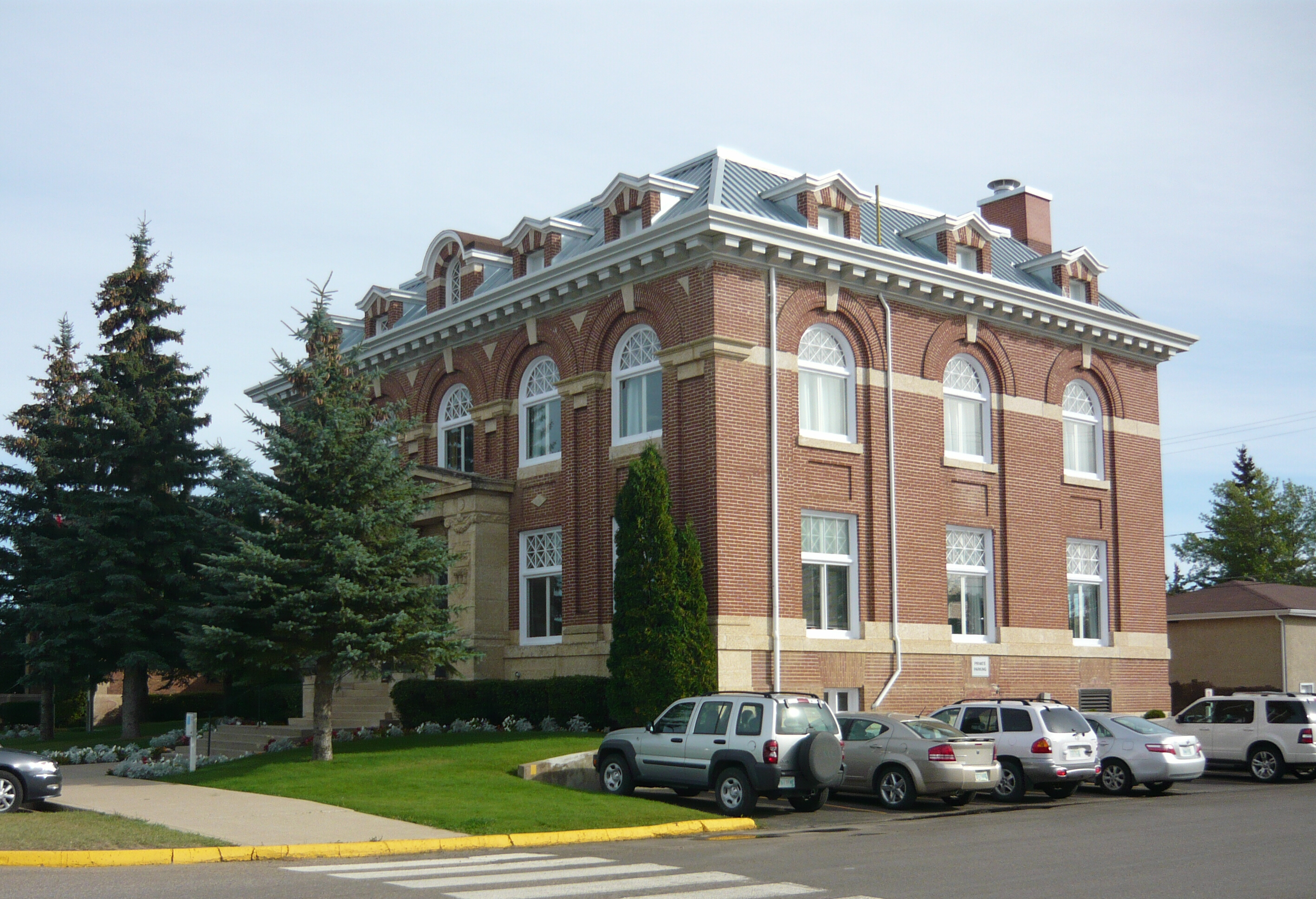
Battleford Court House (1907)
Battleford, Saskatchewan

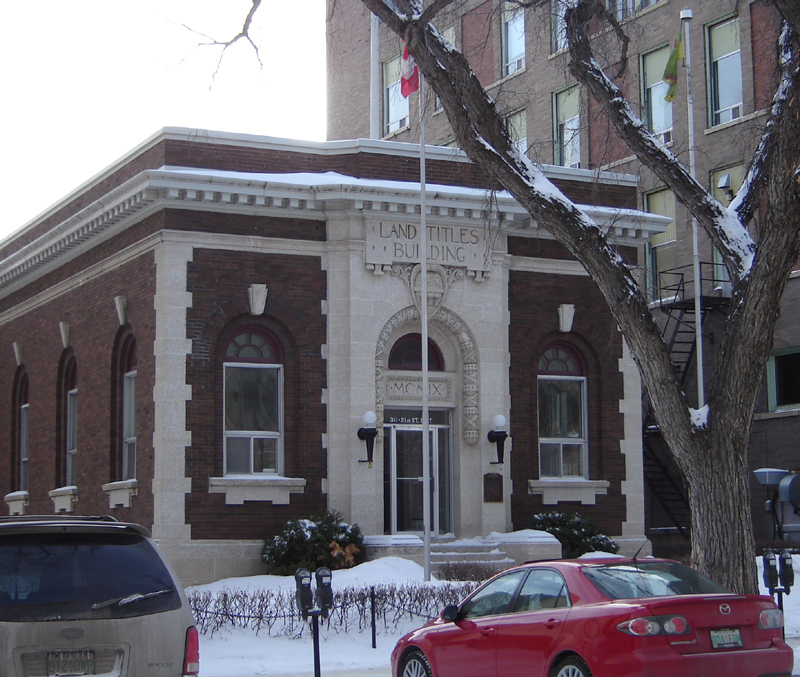
Land Titles Building (1909-1910)
Saskatoon, Saskatchewan

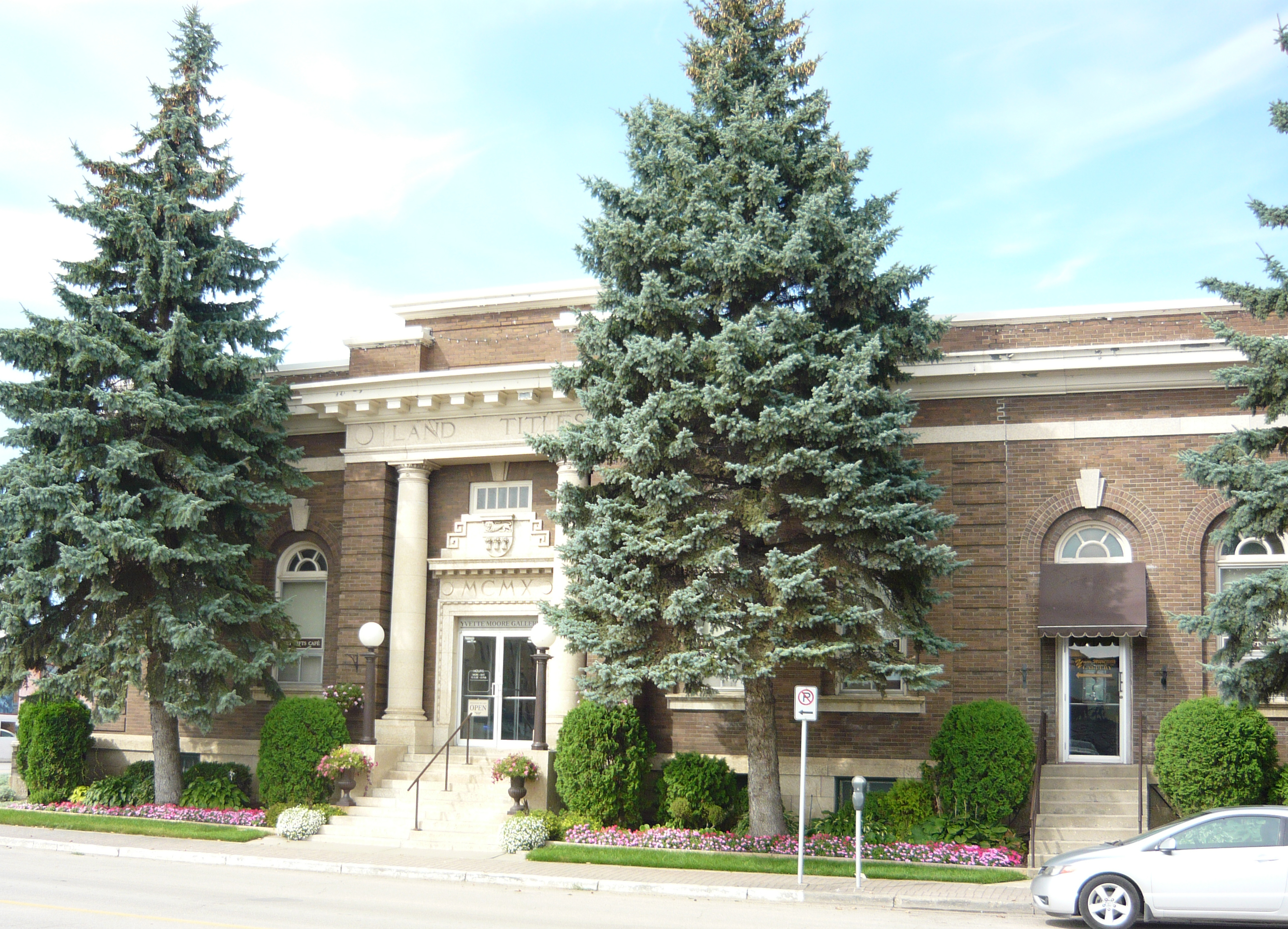
Land Titles Building (1910)
Moose Jaw, Saskatchewan

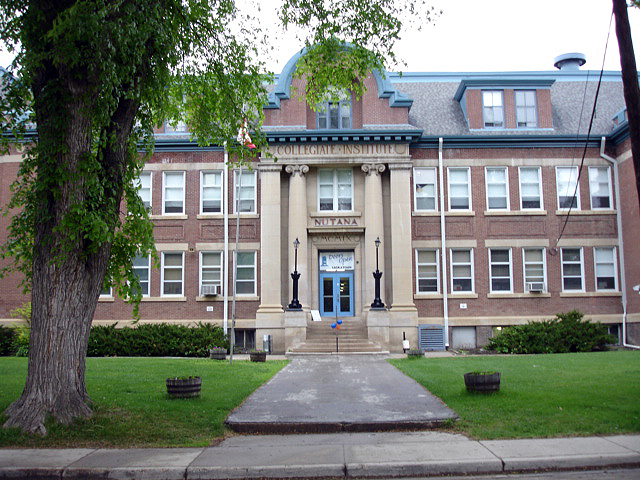
Saskatoon Collegiate Institute (1910)
Now Nutana Collegiate
Saskatoon, Saskatchewan

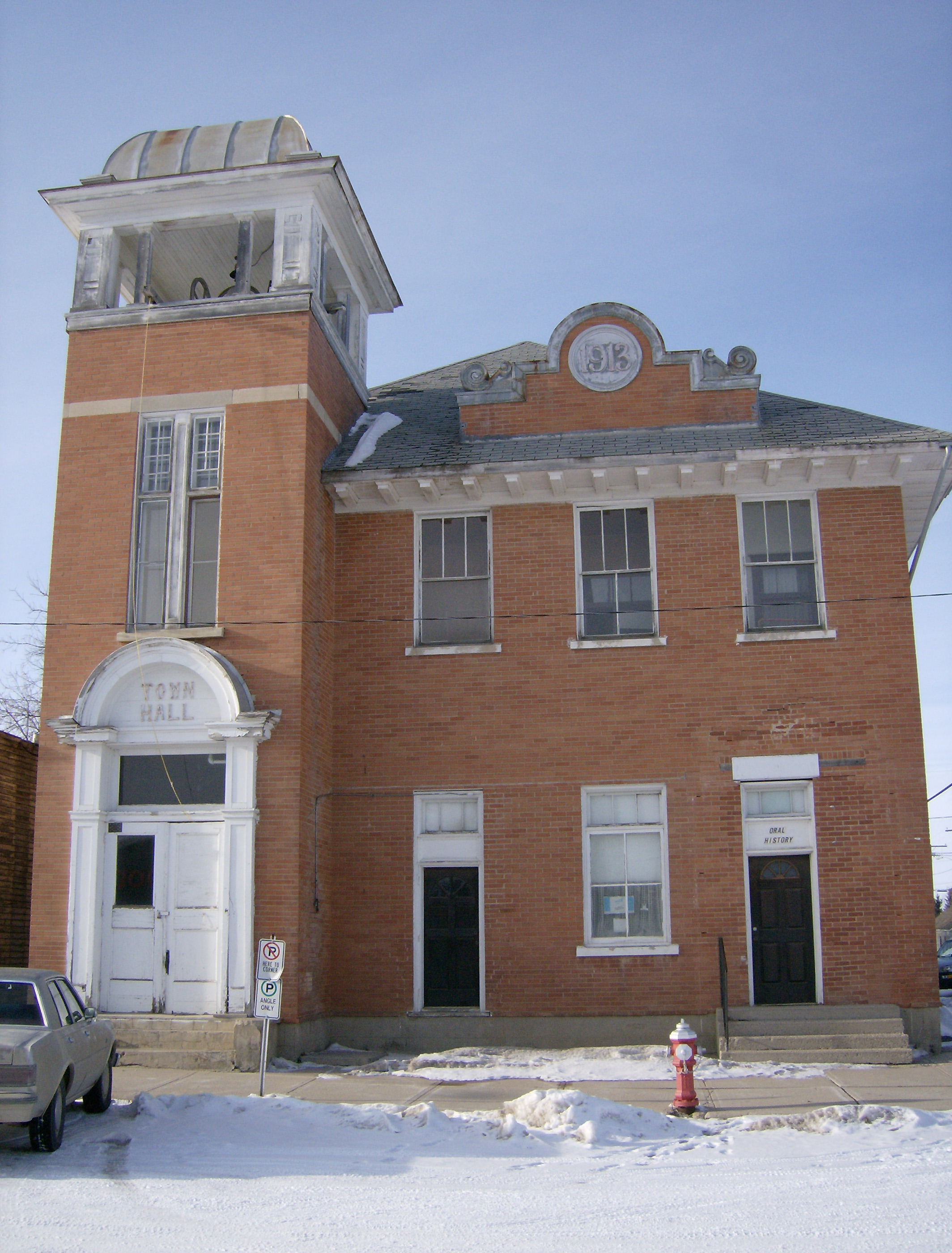
Craik Town Hall (1913) built by Poole Construction Limited (PCL)
Craik, Saskatchewan
