= Canada Saskatchewan Production Studios =

Studio in Regina, Saskatchewan, Canada

John Hopkins Regina Soundstage
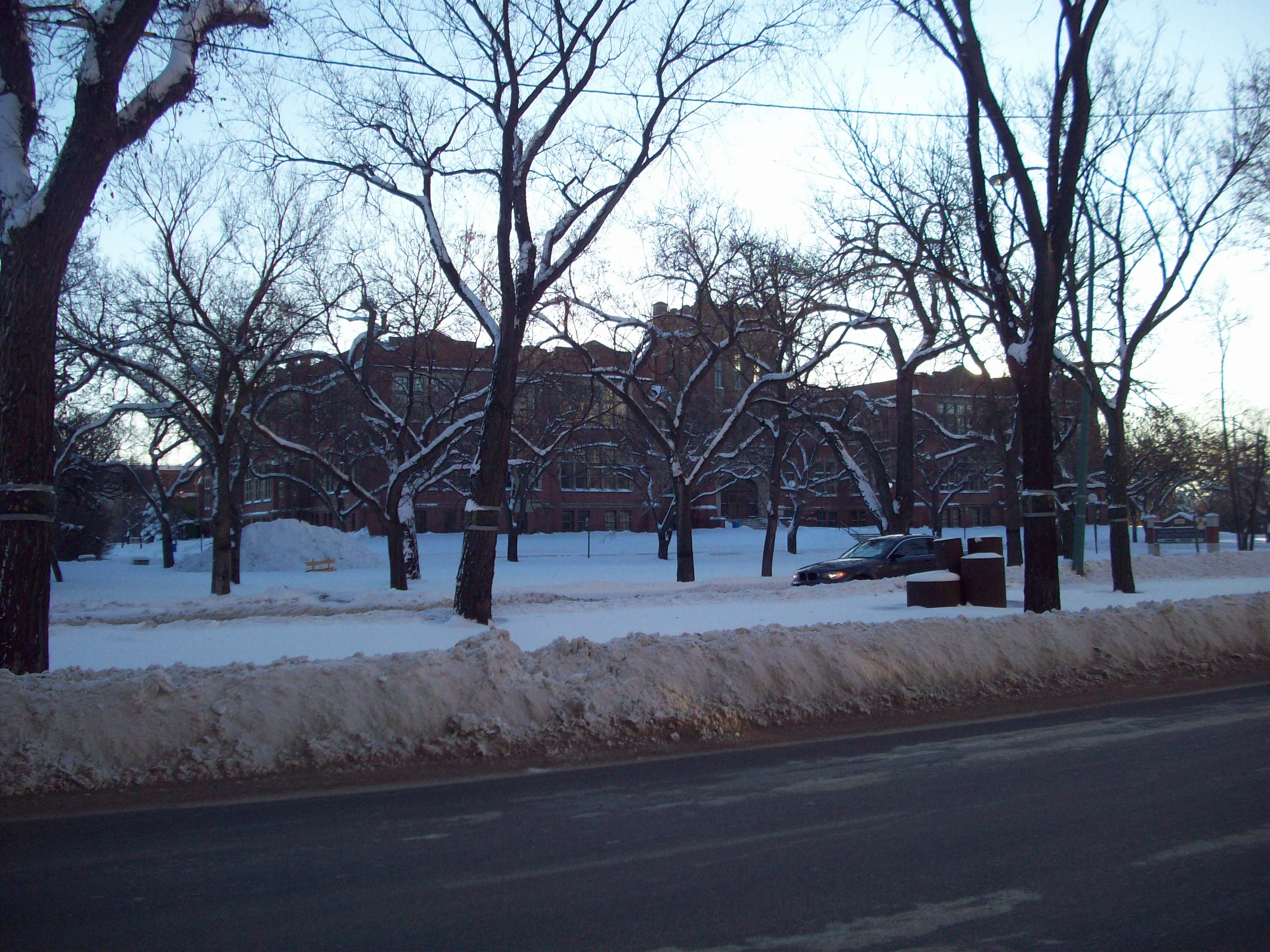
- John Hopkins Regina Soundstage front
- Interactive map of the John Hopkins Regina Soundstage area
- Former names: Canada Saskatchewan Production Studios

General information
- Type: Former: Normal school, university campus Current: Movie/television studio
- Architectural style: Collegiate Gothic
- Location: Regina, Saskatchewan, 1831 College Avenue
- Coordinates: 50°26′23.3″N 104°36′28.8″W
- Current tenants: SaskFilm
- Construction started: 1913
- Completed: 1915
- Renovated: 2001
- Owner: Saskatchewan Property Management Corporation

Design and construction
- Architect: Edgar M. Storey/W.G. Van Egmond
- Architecture firm: Storey and Van Egmond

Renovating team
- Renovating firm: Stantec Architecture

The Canada Saskatchewan Production Studios are located in Regina, Saskatchewan at the corner of College Avenue and Broad Street. Built in 1913, the structure has served as a normal school, military training facility, and fine arts building for the University of Regina. It was internally gutted and reconstructed as a movie and television studio facility in 2002.

The studios were operated by the Saskatchewan Film and Video Development Corporation (SaskFilm) a non-profit corporation responsible for promoting the film industry in Saskatchewan. SaskFilm was shut down in 2013 when the provincial government reorganized funding for arts organizations. It is currently operated by Creative Saskatchewan, a provincial government agency created in 2013.

== History ==
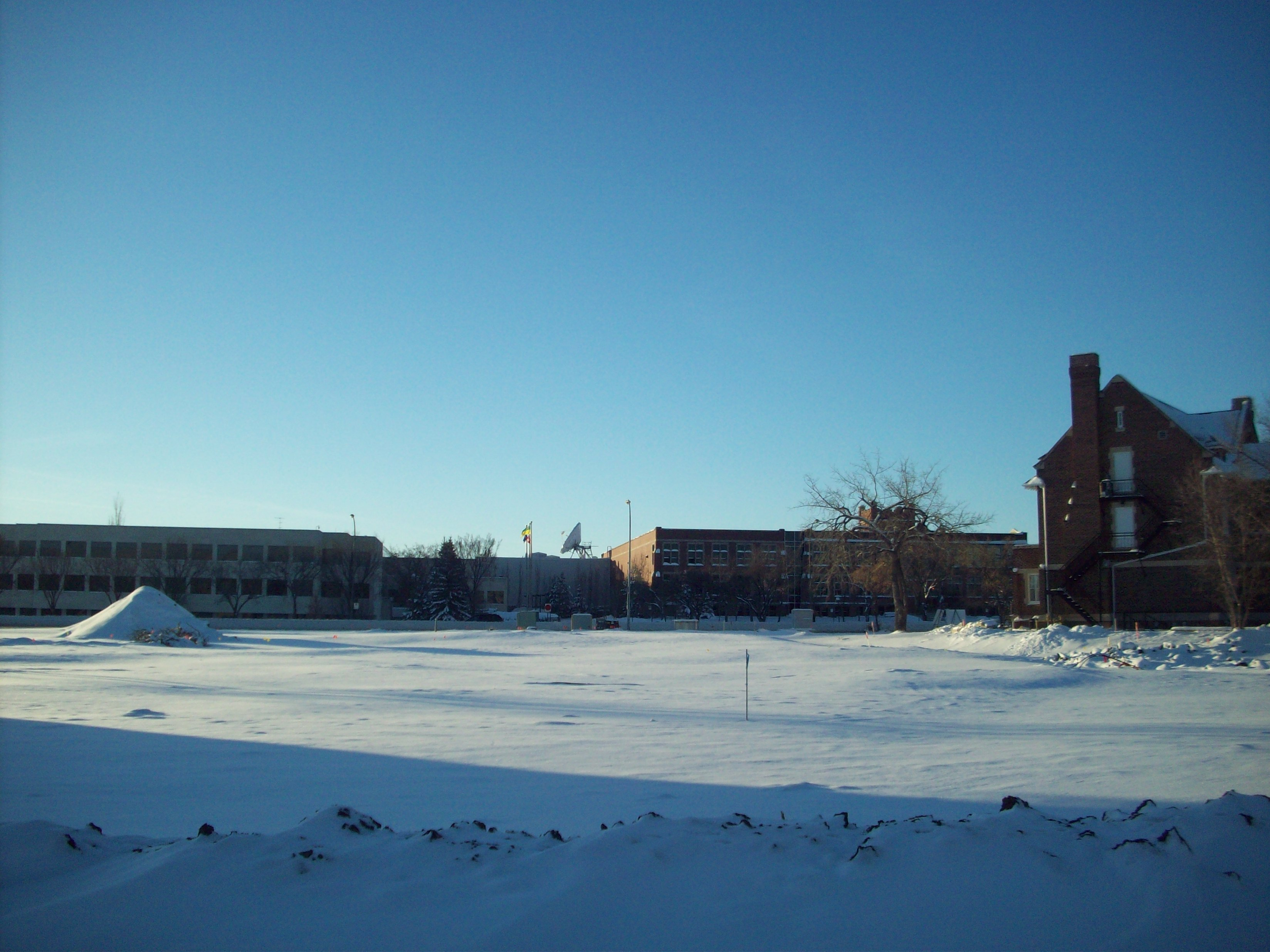
Canada Saskatchewan Production Studios viewed from former Anglican Diocesan property, to the east

The Saskatchewan Normal School was a publicly funded provincial post-secondary institution for the training of teachers. Such training began in Regina as early as 1890. The first permanent home for was built in 1913 at the corner of College Avenue and Broad Street. The Collegiate Gothic style structure was designed by Regina architects Storey and Van Egmond. Classes began in January 1914 as the building was still under construction; it was completed in 1915. Facilities in Saskatoon and Moose Jaw were opened in the 1920s to serve the demand from a growing population. The Normal School operated until 1940, when it was taken over by the Royal Canadian Air Force. The facility was used for military training until the end of World War II.

Following the war, declining enrolment forced the closure of Regina's normal school. Various provincial government departments used the building until 1959, when teacher training was moved from Moose Jaw to Regina. In 1964, the normal schools (referred to as "teachers' colleges" since 1953) were transferred to the University of Saskatchewan and the building became part of the U of S Regina Campus. The building housed the Faculty of Education until a new facility was completed in 1969, at the new main campus in the city's south end. From then it was used by the university's Department of Fine Arts from 1970 until new facilities at the main campus led to building's closure in 1997.

In the mid 1990s, the Government of Saskatchewan, the City of Regina and the Saskatchewan film industry went into partnership and redesigned the building. The building was gutted, leaving the north, east and part of the west walls, then rebuilt to become the Canada Saskatchewan Production Studios. Project management and design was done by Stantec Architecture, and construction work was done by Dominion Construction. J.C. Kenyon Engineering, MacPherson Engineering and Ritenburg Associates also consulted on the project.

The studios have been used less frequently for film and television production since the provincial government's changes to arts funding in 2013.

== Facility ==
The Canada Saskatchewan Production Studios have 4 sound stages which have the capacity to film feature-length movies, television sitcoms or any other needs of the media industry. The building is approximately 82,000 square feet (7,600 m^{2}) with three separate sound stages, from 7,000 to 15,000 square feet (1,400 m^{2}). Carpentry, makeup, wardrobe, & other production facilities are also located on site. The sound stage connects to the CBC Broadcasting Centre, allowing for easy access to their facilities and equipment.

Film and television productions that have used the facility include:

- The Toy Castle (2000-2002)
- Falling Angels (2003)
- Corner Gas (2004–2009)
- Beyond Corner Gas: Tales from Dog River (2005)
- Tideland (2005)
- Sabbatical (2007)
- The Messengers (2007)
- How I Married My High School Crush (2007)
- Surveillance (2007)
- It's Been a Gas (2009)
- Dolan's Cadillac (2009)
- Walled In (2009)
- InSecurity (2010)
- Space Milkshake (2012)
