= St Thomas More Roman Catholic Church, Bradford-on-Avon =

Municipal building in Bradford-on-Avon, Wiltshire, England

St Thomas More Roman Catholic Church
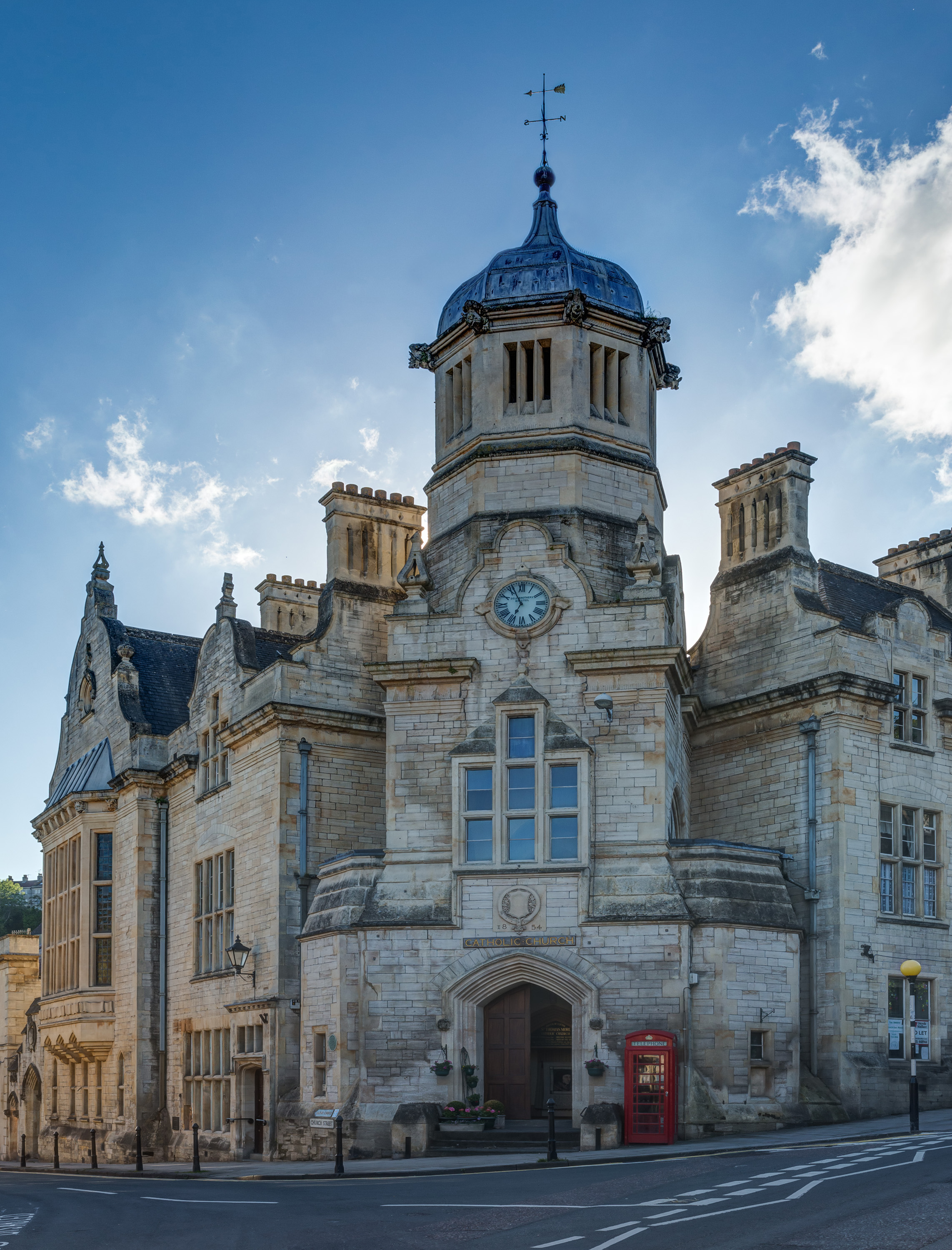
- St Thomas More Roman Catholic Church, Bradford-on-Avon

- Location within Wiltshire Location within England
- 51°20′52″N 2°15′05″W
- OS grid reference: ST 82589 61012
- Location: Market Street, Bradford-on-Avon
- Country: England
- Denomination: Catholic Church
- Website: Churches Together

History
- Founded: 1955
- Dedication: St Thomas More

Architecture
- Heritage designation: Grade II listed building
- Architect: Thomas Fuller
- Style: Elizabethan style
- Completed: 1854

Administration
- Province: Ecclesiastical province of Birmingham
- Metropolis: Archdiocese of Birmingham
- Diocese: Diocese of Clifton
- Deanery: St Oliver Plunkett

Listed Building – Grade II
- Official name: Roman Catholic Church of Sir Thomas More
- Designated: 23 August 1974
- Reference no.: 1364518

The St Thomas More Roman Catholic Church is in Market Street, Bradford-on-Avon, Wiltshire, England. The structure, which originally served as Bradford-on-Avon Town Hall, was designed by Thomas Fuller and is a Grade II listed building.

== Construction and architecture ==
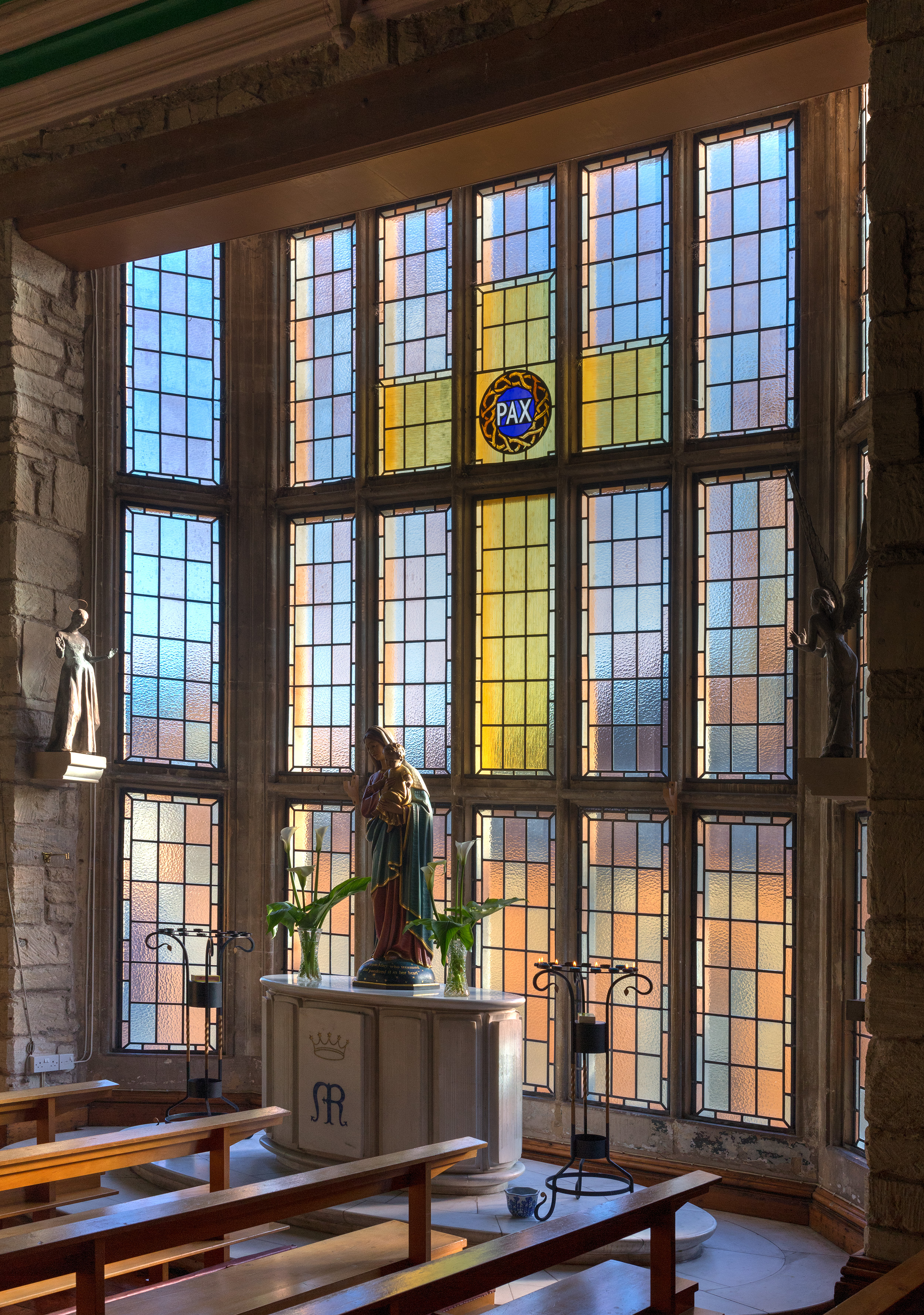
Stained glass windows in the building

An old market hall used to stand at the east end of the Shambles: it was arcaded on the ground floor, so that meat markets could be held, with an assembly hall on the first floor. Meetings of the court leet were held in the assembly room and the basement was used as a store. By the early 19th century the building had become dilapidated, and it was demolished in 1826.

Following the election of town commissioners in the mid-19th century, one of their first actions was to procure a new town hall: the site they chose was at the corner of Market Street and Church Street. The new building, designed by Thomas Fuller (who later emigrated to Canada and became its Chief Dominion Architect) in the Elizabethan style and built in Bath stone, was completed in 1854.

The design featured a prominent four-stage tower at the corner the two streets: the first stage involved a doorway with an arched archivolt, the second stage featured a three-light window, the third stage involved a clock face with an ogee-shaped surround while the fourth stage featured an octagonal piece with lancet windows and grotesques. The whole structure was surmounted by an onion-shaped dome with a ball and weather vane. The Church Street wing, which accommodated a solicitor' s office, featured a prominent oriel window while the Market Street wing, which accommodated the local police station, featured entrances with stone plaques identifying the police station and the office of the police superintendent. Internally, the principal rooms in the complex, which were on the first floor, were the council chamber, the mechanics institute, the library and the reading room.

== Midland Bank ==
Following significant population growth, largely associated with the wool industry, the area became an urban district in 1894. The new council used the town hall as its offices until it acquired Westbury House in 1911. Following a few years of use as a cinema, the town hall was acquired by Midland Bank in around 1915. Midland Bank converted the Church Street wing into a bank branch, and rented out the council chamber to the local branch of the Catholic Church.

== Catholic church ==
In 1955, the Roman Catholic Diocese of Clifton acquired ownership of the building from Midland Bank, which continued to occupy space in the Church Street wing on a rental basis. The building was subsequently converted for use as a place of worship, dedicated to the lawyer Sir Thomas More. The bank branch, which was rebranded following the acquisition of Midland Bank by HSBC in 1992, continued to occupy the Church Street wing, and the Market Street wing was converted for retail use to a design by Esmond Murray of Bath in 1994. As part of a national programme of closures, HSBC vacated the Church Street wing in September 2013.
