= Land Titles Building (Prince Albert, Saskatchewan) =

Land Titles Building (Land Titles Office)
- Interactive map of the Land Titles Building (Land Titles Office) area

General information
- Location: 350 12th Street East, Prince Albert, Saskatchewan, Canada
- Coordinates: 53.2024°N 105.7454°W
- Construction started: 1891
- Completed: 1892
- Client: Dominion Department of Public Works

Design and construction
- Architect: Thomas Fuller

The Land Titles Building is located at 350 12th Street East in Prince Albert, Saskatchewan, Canada. The federal government architect Thomas Fuller designed the building. The building is a designated Heritage Property. After 1907 the building was repurposed as for a time used as a post office, an Anglican theology student's residence, an armoury for the 203rd Battalion of the Canadian Military, an employment agency, the winter office for the Prince Albert National Park, Federal Department of Agriculture offices and finally as a private residence.
