= Arcola, Saskatchewan =

Town in Saskatchewan, Canada

Arcola
- Town
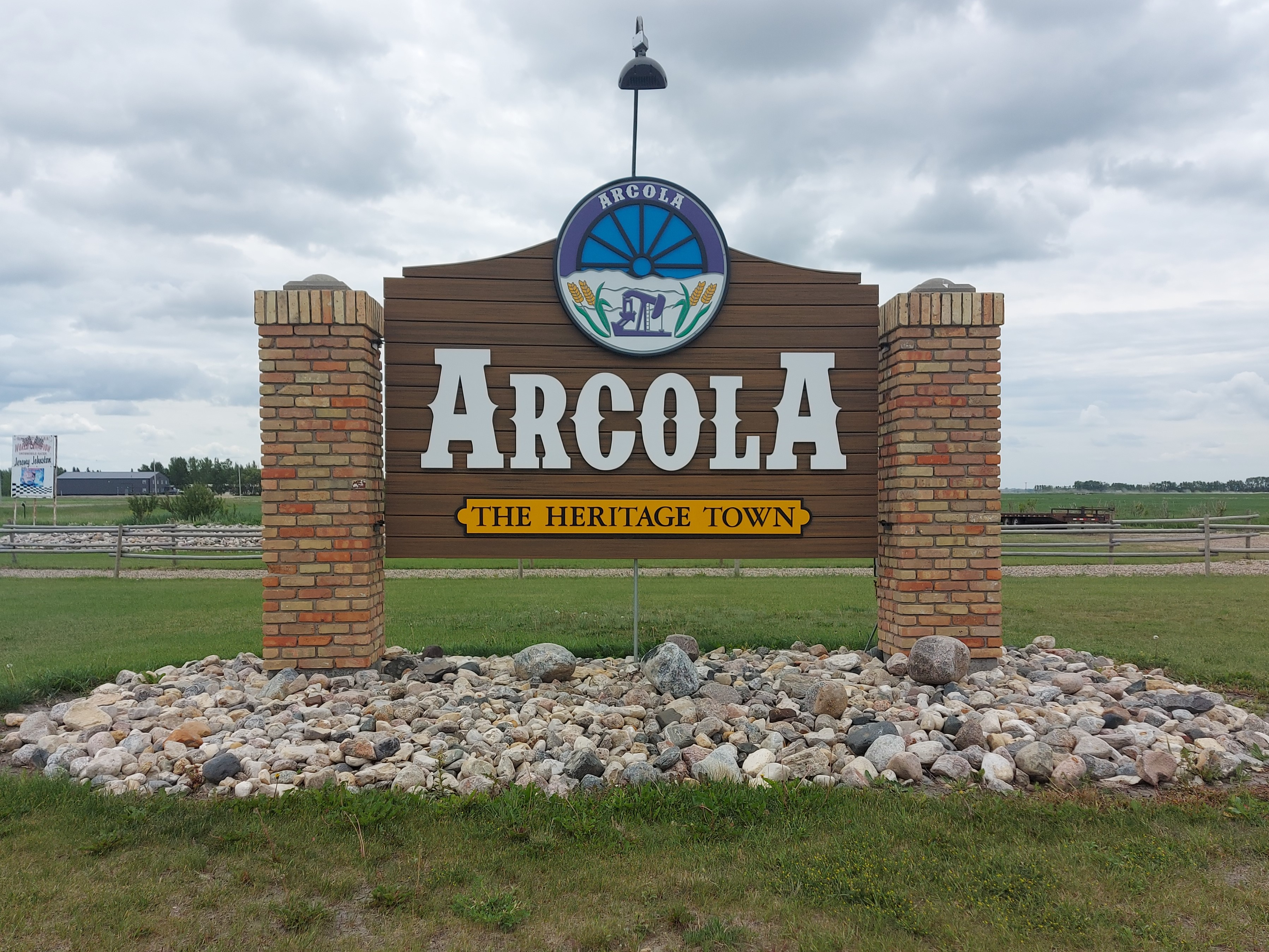
- Nicknames: The Heritage Town, City of Angels
- Location of Arcola in Saskatchewan Arcola (Canada)
- Coordinates: 49.637°N 102.490°W
- Country: Canada
- Province: Saskatchewan
- Region: Southeast
- Census division: 1
- Rural municipality: Brock No. 64
- Post office Founded: 1889
- Incorporated (Village): 1901

Government
  - Mayor: Scott Tessier
  - Town CAO: Rebecca Korchinski
  - Governing body: Arcola Town Council

Area
  - Total: 3.39 km^{2} (1.31 sq mi)

Population (2016)
  - Total: 657
  - Density: 193.7/km^{2} (502/sq mi)
  - National Population Rank (Out of 5,008): 3,006th
- Time zone: CST
- Postal code: S0C 0G0
- Area code: 306
- Highways: Highway 13 Highway 604
- Climate: Dfb
- Website: https://www.townofarcola.ca/

Arcola is a town in south-east Saskatchewan, Canada, approximately 60 kilometres (37 mi) north and 40 kilometres (25 mi) east of Estevan. Highway 13, Highway 604, and Arcola Airport provide access to the community.

Arcola served as the location for the Allan King film feature of W.O. Mitchell's Who Has Seen the Wind.

== History ==
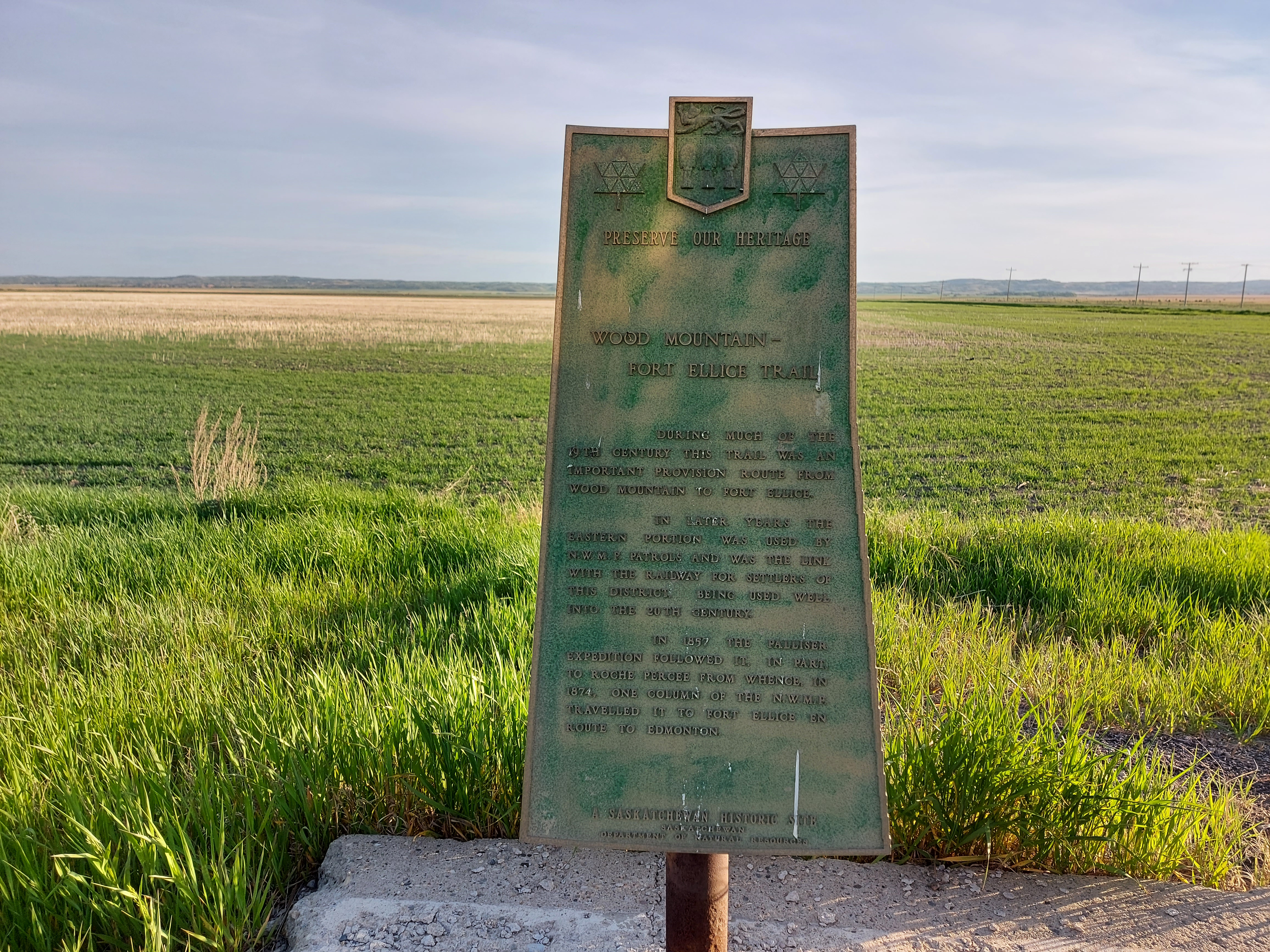
A plaque commemorating the Fort Ellice-Wood Mountain Trail that ran from the hunting grounds of Wood Mountain to Fort Ellice.

From 1757 to the 1850s the Fort Ellice–Wood Mountain Trail was used by early fur traders, Metis, and First Nations as a supply route from the buffalo hunting grounds near Wood Mountain to Fort Ellice. Pemmican was one of the main goods brought back to Fort Ellice. The trail ran along the south side of Moose Mountain Upland, through what is today Arcola. The Palliser expedition in 1857 and the North-West Mounted Police (NWMP), as part of the March West to deal with the Cypress Hills Massacre, in 1874 also went through this area. A plaque on the north side of town commemorates this trail. The route taken by the NWMP is commemorated by a series of highways through Manitoba, Saskatchewan, and Alberta called the Red Coat Trail.

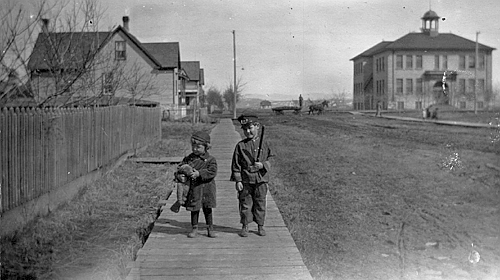
Arcola, 1914

In 2003, Arcola celebrated its 100th anniversary, marking the fact that it predates the province by two years. Arcola is known as Saskatchewan's "Heritage Town" due to its many historical brick and wood-frame structures. Settlers in the area originally built a community known as Clare, located two miles north-east of where Arcola exists today, but almost all the buildings of Clare were moved when the CPR announced in the early part of 1900 that the railroad would run south of town. Arcola was the "end point" of the southern branch line running west from Souris, Manitoba for four years, during which time it became an important hub for westward migration. At one point, it was the 11th largest town in what is now the province of Saskatchewan; it was then known as Assiniboia. With flourishing settlement and economic growth, many thought Arcola would achieve city status. It was during this heyday, and using bricks made in the town's own brick plant, that many of today's heritage homes and buildings were erected.

== Heritage buildings ==
Arcola has several heritage properties registered on the Canadian Register of historic places.

- Arcola Town Hall (Arcola Opera House) (1905) at 201 Main Street
- Arcola Court House (1908 to 1909) at 619 Souris Avenue
- Law Office Building (1916) at 114 Main Street
- Arcola Land Titles Building (1911 to 1912) at 301 Main Street
- Pharmacy Building (1903) at 107 Main Street

== Demographics ==
In the 2021 Census of Population conducted by Statistics Canada, Arcola had a population of 636 living in 269 of its 320 total private dwellings, a change of −3.2% from its 2016 population of 657. With a land area of 3.46 km^{2} (1.34 sq mi), it had a population density of 183.8/km^{2} (476.1/sq mi) in 2021.

Canada census – Arcola community profile

	2021	2016	2011
Population	636 (-3.2% from 2016)	657 (1.2% from 2011)	649 (27.5% from 2006)
Land area	3.46 km^{2} (1.34 sq mi)	3.39 km^{2} (1.31 sq mi)	3.39 km^{2} (1.31 sq mi)
Population density	183.8/km^{2} (476/sq mi)	193.9/km^{2} (502/sq mi)	191.5/km^{2} (496/sq mi)
Median age	36.4 (M: 37.6, F: 35.6)	35.0 (M: 35.5, F: 34.2)	36.3 (M: 36.0, F: 36.4)
Private dwellings	320 (total) 269 (occupied)	321 (total)	303 (total)
Median household income	$85,000

References: 2021 2016 2011

== Education ==
Arcola School offers Pre-Kindergarten through grade 12 and is part of South East Cornerstone Public School Division #209. This public school has an enrollment of 215 pupils. The Panthers are the school team.

== Parks and recreation ==
A fair and rodeo, town wide garage sale day, Robbie Burns' Night, Co-Op Equity Days, a snowmobile rally, fall supper, and Canada Day Celebrations are among the town's annual events.

The town is home to an art gallery and the Southeast Saskatchewan Photo Museum. A full range of stores and services are available including three antique shops, a hospital and medical clinic, a K-12 school and pottery studio, as well as full-service restaurants, a laundromat, and a motel.

The skating and curling rinks were destroyed by fire in 2001. Following this, community fundraising and government grants were used to construct a new rink adjoining the Prairie Place Hall, creating a multi-use community facility called Prairie Place Complex. Prairie Place Complex features, an ice rink, three sheet curling, a hall that seats 450 people, and ball diamonds.

The Arcola/Kisbey Combines of the senior men's Big 6 Hockey League and the Arcola Threshers of the Saskota Baseball league play at the Prairie Place Complex.

== Notable people ==
- Gerald McLellan (1932–2009), lawyer and Ombudsman for Saskatchewan, 1987–1993; also a bencher of the Law Society of Saskatchewan, 1976–1982. Born and educated in Arcola.
- Canadian author James Sinclair Ross wrote his seminal 1941 novel As for Me and My House in Arcola.
- Arcola is the hometown of former Vancouver Canucks, and NCAA All American ice hockey defenceman, Prestin Ryan.

== See also ==
- List of communities in Saskatchewan
- List of towns in Saskatchewan
