= Principal Group =

Defunct group of Canadian financial companies

- Industry: Financial
- Founded: 1954
- Founder: Donald Mercer Cormie
- Defunct: 1987
- Fate: Bankruptcy
- Headquarters: Edmonton, Alberta, Canada
- Area served: Canada

The Principal Group was a group of interrelated Canadian financial companies that collapsed in 1987, resulting in losses to an estimated 67,000 people. Losses were recovered in part through provincial governments paying compensation, based on findings as to deficiencies in regulatory oversight.

== History ==
The Principal Group was primarily three companies: First Investors Corporation, Associated Investors of Canada and Principal Savings and Trust Corporation. First Investors Corporation was established by Donald Cormie in 1954. The company was initially based in Edmonton, Alberta. The company sold investment contracts, which were contracts by which investors remitted monthly amounts to First Investors Corporation, in return for a promised future redemption amount, plus interest. In 1959, First Investors opened offices in Nova Scotia, New Brunswick and Newfoundland. At the same time, it also opened offices in Washington, Oregon and Colorado as Principal Investors, since the name First Investors was owned in the United States by another party. Associated Investors of Canada was acquired in 1962.

The companies were subject to Alberta Securities Commission regulation and also required licences to sell investment contracts. Alberta regulatory concerns were expressed as early as 1961, which concerns continued until the demise of the companies some twenty-five years later. These concerns related to excessive valuations of transactions and the general solvency of the companies, among other matters. On June 30, 1987, Alberta Treasurer Dick Johnston cancelled the operating licences of First Investors Corporation and Associated Investors of Canada. Six weeks later, the Principal Group filed for bankruptcy, owing more than 67,000 investors approximately $468 million ($1.12 billion today).

Calgary lawyer William Code was appointed in 1987 to conduct an inquiry into the financial affairs of the corporation, the findings of which were released in July 1989. Code found fault with the regulatory conduct of the Alberta government. Two weeks after the report was released, the accountable minister during the period under review, Connie Osterman, was dismissed from cabinet by Premier Don Getty.

The Ombudsman of Alberta, Aleck Trawick, initiated a separate inquiry. This inquiry was followed by inquiries initiated by Ombudsman offices in British Columbia, Saskatchewan, Nova Scotia, and New Brunswick. All the inquiries found degrees of fault in the regulatory oversight by the various provinces. Investors finally settled their various claims in 2001, at which time their estimated recovery rate was 90%, including compensation paid by provincial governments.
