= Land Titles Building (Moose Jaw) =

Coordinates: 50.3927°N 105.5370°W

Land Titles Building/Yvette Moore Gallery
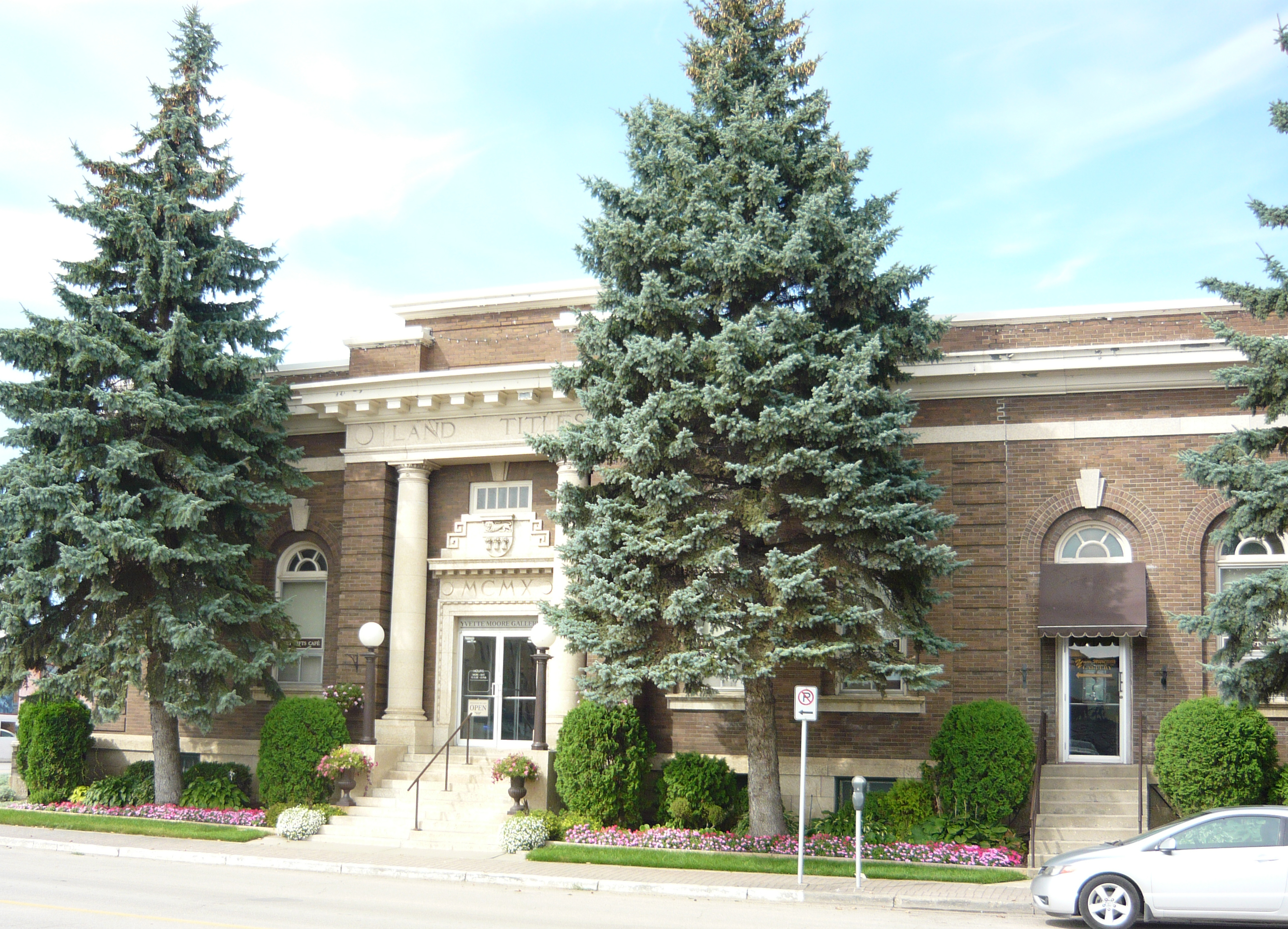
- Interactive map of the Land Titles Building/Yvette Moore Gallery area

General information
- Location: 76 Fairford Street West, Moose Jaw, Saskatchewan, Canada
- Construction started: 1910/01/01
- Completed: 1910/12/31
- Client: Province of Saskatchewan

Design and construction
- Architect: Storey and Van Egmond

The Land Titles Building is located at 76 Fairford Street West in Moose Jaw, Saskatchewan, Canada. The architectural firm of Storey and Van Egmond designed the building. The building is a designated Heritage Property.

The restoration of the Land Titles building and its change to The Yvette Moore Gallery began in January 1999. Paint stripper uncovered the copper doors and window frames that are now part of the gallery's distinctive décor. Chandeliers in the main Gallery are reproductions of the copper fixtures, to match the décor. It is furnished with some of the original steel cabinets, dating back to the early 1900s.
