= Land Titles Building – Victoria Armoury =

Building in Edmonton

Coordinates: 53.5386°N 113.5024°W

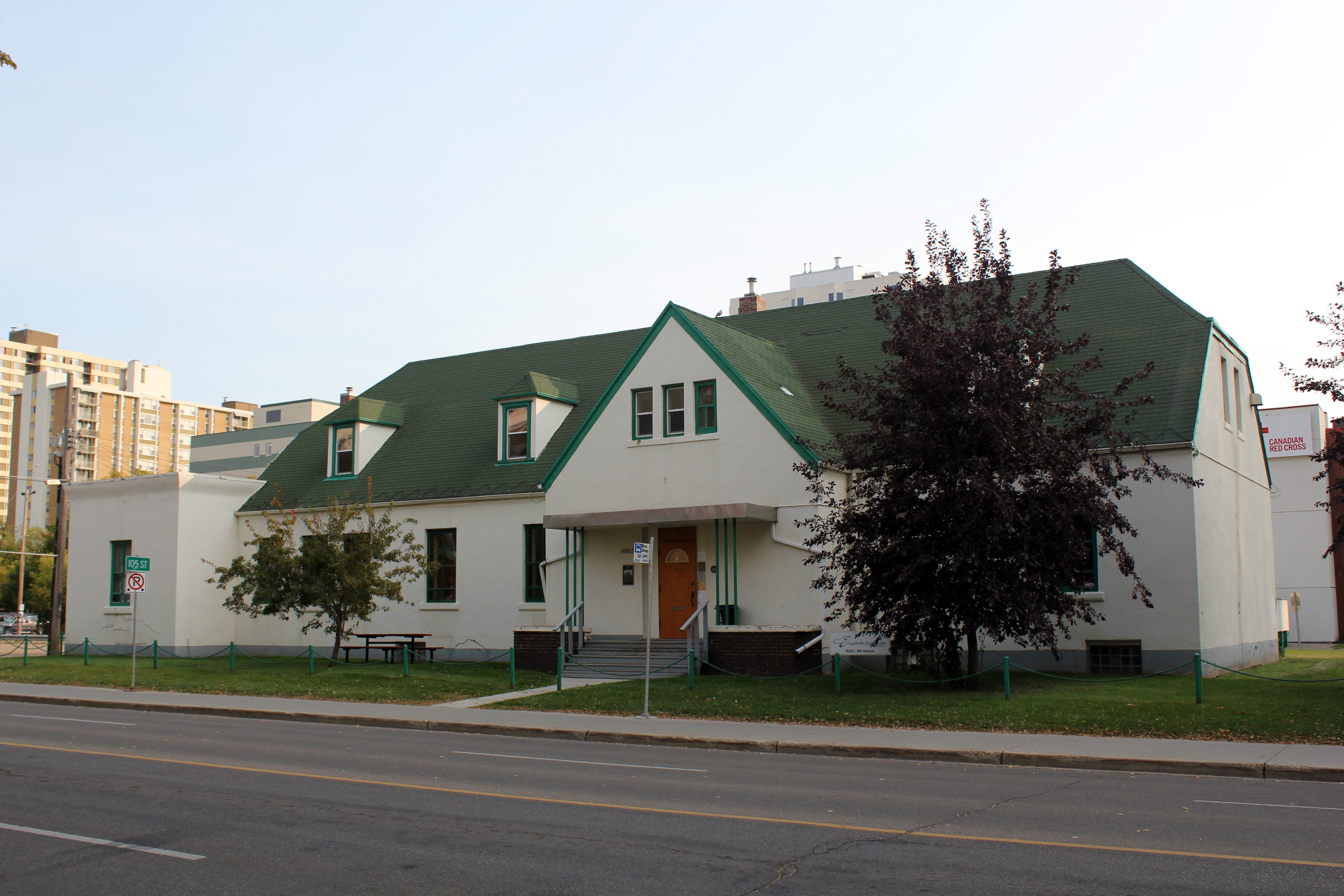
- Interactive map of the Land Titles Building – Victoria Armoury area

General information
- Type: Drill Hall / armoury
- Location: two city lots Edmonton, Alberta, Canada, 10523 100 Avenue,
- Current tenants: Edmonton chapter of the Elizabeth Fry Society,
- Inaugurated: 1893
- Owner: Provincial Historic Resource since 1977

Technical details
- Structural system: 1 1/2-storey building of brick covered in stucco

Design and construction
- Architects: Thomas Fuller, Chief Architect of the Dominion
- Awards and prizes: Canada's Register of Historic Places

The Land Titles Building was a federal government office built in Edmonton in 1893. It later became the Victoria Armoury, and was used by three Edmonton regiments. It is "likely the oldest existing Land Titles Office in Alberta, one of the oldest extant buildings in the province, and certainly the first purpose-built registry office".

Located at what is now 10523 100 Avenue, the building was constructed as a larger replacement to the much smaller first Dominion Lands Office in Edmonton (which is now represented at Fort Edmonton Park). It housed the "Crown Land, Timber and Registry Office for the District of Alberta in the North-West Territories". This was the place that settlers registered their claims (land title) to free lands under the Dominion Lands Act.

The design of the building is based on a basic plan drawn up by Thomas Fuller, Chief Architect of the Dominion, but is similar to the design of a typical Hudson's Bay Company warehouse. The original design is a bisymmetrical fenestration pattern, which includes a jerkinshead roof with narrow, hipped dormers. Two additions have been made to the building over its lifetime.

At one point federal government attempted to move its offices across the river to the rival settlement of Strathcona, but an angry mob sabotaged the effort and there was an armed standoff with the North-West Mounted Police.

In 1912 the Land Titles office moved out of the building and it became an armoury. It was then home to several different Edmonton regiments, in succession, over the next half-century: the 19th Alberta Dragoons (1915–39), Edmonton Fusiliers (1940–46), and the 19th Alberta Armoured Car Regiment (1947–48). Subsequently, the building became the offices and laboratories of the Provincial Government Department of Health.

The building has been a Provincial Historic Resource since 1977. Since 1995, the building has the home of the Edmonton chapter of the Elizabeth Fry Society, a women's charity, which moved there from former offices in the McLeod Building.

== See also ==
List of Armouries in Canada
