= Donald Mercer Cormie =

Canadian lawyer (1922–2010)

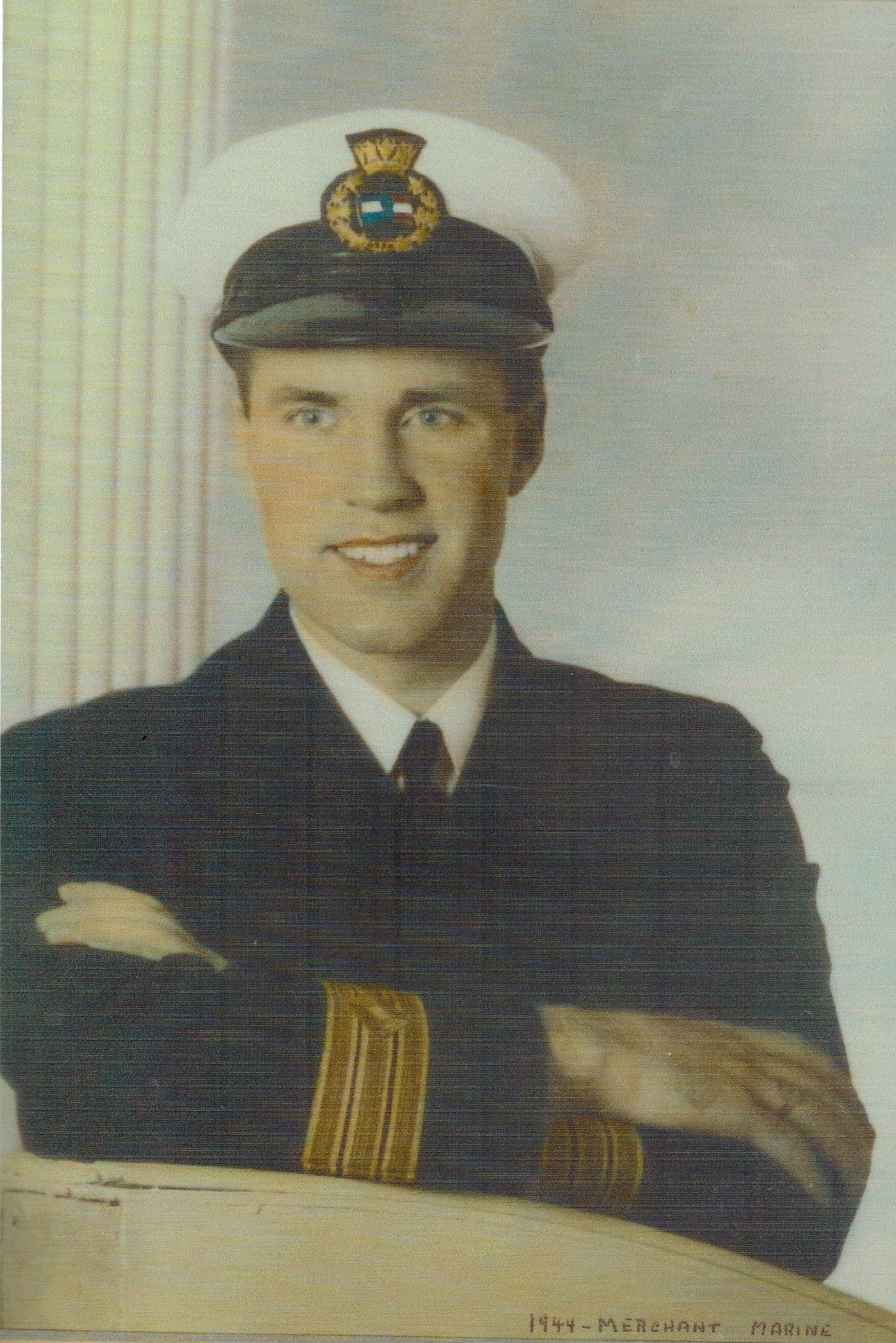
- Donald Mercer Cormie, 1943-44 Merchant Marine
- Born: July 24, 1922
- Died: February 20, 2010 (aged 87); Scottsdale, Arizona, United States

Donald Mercer Cormie (July 24, 1922 – February 20, 2010) was a Canadian lawyer, financier and founder of the Principal Group.

== History ==
Donald Cormie was in the Canadian Merchant Marine from 1943 to 1944 before receiving his LLM from Harvard Law School in 1946. With Jack W. Kennedy, Cormie co-founded the law firm Cormie Kennedy (1954-1987) in Edmonton, Alberta, and had a prestigious legal career.

Cormie was the president and founder of one of Canada's largest investment firms, which became known as the Principal Group. The main companies associated with the Principal Group were First Investors Corporation, Associated Investors of Canada and Principal Savings and Trust Corporation. The associated corporations within the Principal Group grew to more than $1 billion of assets. The corporations were closed by regulators in 1987 and subsequently liquidated. At the time of the closures, approximately 67,000 investors were at risk of losing an estimated $500 million in funds advanced to Principal Group entities. Various provincial governments, including the Government of Alberta, the main regulator, paid an estimated $140 million in compensation on the losses of investor-savers, based on deficiencies in regulatory oversight.

Subsequent to the collapse of the Principal Group, Donald Cormie relocated to Arizona, and was never able to start another business. The legal fees associated with the collapse are estimated to have cost him $10 million. Donald Cormie pleaded guilty under the Investors Act to misleading investors and was fined half a million dollars. In addition, the Tax Court of Canada ordered him to pay $4 million in back taxes on a $7.2 million loan he took from Principal just before it collapsed. A further ruling was made by a judge of the Court of Queen's Bench of Alberta, who ruled that Donald Cormie made improper payouts totalling half a million dollars to creditors who were family members or company employees, and ordered that the creditors give back the money.

Donald Cormie was also the founder of Cormie Ranch, a 22,000-acre (89 km^{2}) purebred cattle ranch near Tomahawk, Alberta. At its peak in the 1980s, it was the largest multi-breed purebred cattle ranch in Canada and the largest private bull semen bank in the world, developing sought-after bulls in the Simmental and Maine-Anjou breeds and earning $3.3 million from its prize bull, Signal.
