= Thomas Fuller (architect) =

Canadian architect (1823–1898)

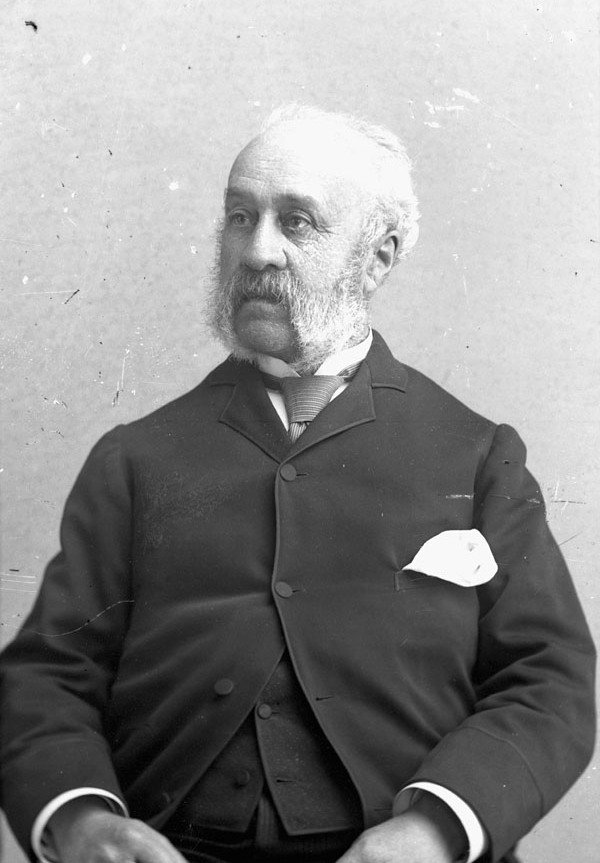
- Fuller in 1889, photographed by William James Topley
- Born: 8 March 1823; Bath, Somerset, England
- Died: 28 September 1898 (aged 75); Ottawa, Ontario, Canada
- Occupation: Architect
- Practice: Thomas Fuller & Chilion Jones; Chief Dominion Architect

Thomas Fuller (8 March 1823 – 28 September 1898) was an English-born Canadian architect. From 1881 to 1896, he was Chief Dominion Architect for the Government of Canada, during which time he played a role in the design and construction of every major federal building.

== Early life and education ==
Fuller was born on 8 March 1823, in Bath, Somerset, England, where he trained as an architect with James Wilson (becoming a pupil of Wilson's in 1844) alongside his future architectural business partner William Bruce Gingell. His father, also called Thomas, was a carriage-maker, and his mother was Mary Fuller (née Tiley).

== Career ==
While living in Bath and London, he did a number of architectural projects, with Gingell (working as Fuller and Gingell from 1848 to 1850), with Wilson (with whom he went into partnership in 1854), or on his own account. In 1845, he left for Antigua, where he spent two years working on the new St John's Cathedral, before emigrating to Canada in 1857. Settling in Toronto, he formed a partnership with Chilion Jones in which Fuller was responsible for design work. The company first won the contract to design Toronto's Church of St. Stephen-in-the-Fields.

In 1859, the Legislative Assembly in Ottawa voted the sum of £75,000 for the erection of a "Parliament House" and offered a premium of $1000 for the best design within that budget. The winning bid was made by Fuller and Jones for a Neo-Gothic design. The principal architects until its completion in 1866 were Thomas Fuller and Charles Baillairge. In Hand Book to the Parliamentary and Departmental Buildings, Canada (1867), Joseph Bureau wrote, "The corner stone was laid with great ceremony by His Royal Highness the Prince of Wales [the future king Edward VII] in September 1860, on which occasion the rejoicings partook of the nature of the place, the lumber arches and men being a novelty to most of its visitors, bullocks and sheep were roasted whole upon the government ground and all comers were feasted."

In 1867, he won the contract to build the New York State Capitol building in Albany, New York, and spent the next several years in the United States. The project ran into severe cost overruns and an inquiry blamed Fuller. Fuller thus returned to Canada and, unable to work in the more lucrative private sector, in 1881 became Chief Dominion Architect, succeeding Thomas Seaton Scott. Canada's Department of Public Works erected a number of post offices in smaller urban centres during Thomas Fuller's term as chief architect.

== Works ==
=== United Kingdom ===
==== England ====
Building	Year completed	Heritage status	Builder/architect	Style	Location	Image
Central Block of Greenbank Prison (formerly Longfield House)	1849	Listed Grade II by Historic England in 2007	Architects: Fuller & Gingell (Thomas Fuller and William Bruce Gingell); Builder: William Clift		Plymouth, Devon	
Cranwells (formerly Summerfield School) Weston Park East	1852	Listed Grade II by Historic England in 1972	Architects: Wilson & Fuller (James Wilson and Thomas Fuller)		Bath, Somerset	
Bradford-on-Avon Town Hall and police station and offices (now St Thomas More Roman Catholic Church, Bradford-on-Avon)	1854	Listed Grade II by Historic England in 1974 (former town hall) and in 1993 (police station and offices)	Architect: Thomas Fuller; Builders: Long and Spender	Elizabethan	Market Street, Bradford-on-Avon, Wiltshire	
Anglican Mortuary Chapel in the churchyard of St Mary the Virgin, Bathwick (now Smallcombe Cemetery	1855	Listed Grade II by Historic England in 2008	Architect: Thomas Fuller; Builder: George Mann	Early English	Darlington Street, Bath, Somerset	
Buildings at Holt Road Cemetery, Bradford-on-Avon	1856		Architect: Thomas Fuller		Bradford-on-Avon, Wiltshire	
Nos 1 and 2, Christchurch Cottages, Bath	1856	Listed Grade II by Historic England in 2011	Architect believed to be Thomas Fuller		Julian Road, Bath, Somerset	
Newark Works	c. 1857	Listed Grade II by Historic England in 2006. The building was converted in 2022 into flexible working space for small businesses as part of the Bath Quays development. Its larger site was developed from 2011 into the Bath Western Riverside residential scheme.	Architect: Thomas Fuller		Lower Bristol Road, Bath, Somerset	

==== Wales ====
Building	Year completed	Heritage status	Builder/architect	Style	Location	Image
Llandovery College (known until the 1880s as the Thomas Phillips Institution, or the Welsh Collegiate Institution)	1851	Listed Grade II by Cadw in 2004	Architects: Fuller & Gingell (Thomas Fuller and William Bruce Gingell)	Tudor Gothic	Queensway, Llandovery, Carmarthenshire	

=== United States ===
==== California ====
Building	Year completed	Heritage status	Builder/architect	Style	Location	Image
San Francisco City Hall	1899	Destroyed in the 1906 San Francisco Earthquake	Architects: Fuller & Laver (Thomas Fuller and Augustus Laver)	Second Empire	Larkin Street, McAllister Street and the former City Hall Avenue, San Francisco	

==== New York State ====
Building	Year completed	Heritage status	Builder/architect	Style	Location	Image
Ground floor of the New York State Capitol	1867–1875	It was listed on the National Register of Historic Places in 1971, then included as a contributing property when the Lafayette Park Historic District was listed in 1978. The New York State Capitol was declared a National Historic Landmark in 1979.	Architect: Thomas Fuller	Classical/Romanesque	Albany, New York	

=== Canada ===
==== Alberta ====
Building	Year completed	Heritage status	Builder/architect	Style	Location	Image
Land Titles Building – Victoria Armoury	1893	On Canada's Register of Historic Places since 1977	Architect: Thomas Fuller		10523 100 Avenue, Edmonton	
Calgary Post Office	1895	Demolished in about 1929	Architect: Thomas Fuller		8th Avenue, Calgary	

==== British Columbia ====
Building	Year completed	Heritage status	Builder/architect	Style	Location	Image
The Armoury (home of The Royal Westminster Regiment)	1895	A Recognized Federal Heritage Building since 1987	Architect: Thomas Fuller; Builder: David Bain	Italianate/ Romanesque Revival	530 Queen's Avenue, New Westminster	

==== Manitoba ====
Building	Year completed	Heritage status	Builder/architect	Style	Location	Image
Former Dominion Post Office Building / Portage City Hall	1898	Originally a post office, it became the Portage la Prairie City Hall in 1960. A plaque erected in 1983 by the Historic Sites and Monuments Advisory Board of Canada describes it as a representative of small, urban post offices designed by Fuller, and says that is mostly intact and has not undergone major exterior renovation. It was designated a National Historic Site of Canada in 1983.	Architect: Thomas Fuller	Romanesque Revival	97 Saskatchewan Avenue West, Portage la Prairie	

==== New Brunswick ====
Building	Year completed	Heritage status	Builder/architect	Style	Location	Image
Old Bathurst Post Office	1885	A National Historic Site of Canada since 1998	Architect: Thomas Fuller	Romanesque	96 Main Street, Bathurst, New Brunswick	

==== Nova Scotia ====
Building	Year completed	Heritage status	Builder/architect	Style	Location	Image
Halifax Armoury	1858	It was designated a National Historic Site of Canada in 1989 and a Classified Federal Heritage Building in 1991.	Architect: Thomas Fuller	Romanesque Revival	Cornwallis Street, Halifax	
Gilbert H. Grosvenor Hall (originally built as the Baddeck Post Office and Custom House)	1887	On Canada's Register of Historic Places since 1983	Architect: Thomas Fuller	Romanesque Revival	532 Chebucto Street, Baddeck	

==== Ontario ====
Building	Year completed	Heritage status	Builder/architect	Style	Location	Image
St. Stephen-in-the-Fields Anglican Church	1858	The church was gutted by fire in 1865 and subsequently rebuilt and enlarged by Henry Langley. None of Fuller's original interior survives but, on the exterior, the polychromatic masonry, solid buttressing and open bell core survive.	Architects: Fuller & Jones (Thomas Fuller and Chilion Jones); rebuilt by Henry Langley	Neo-Gothic	103 Bellevue Avenue, Kensington Market, Toronto	
Canada's Parliament Buildings Centre Block	1858	Destroyed by fire in 1916. in The replacement building was designed by a team of architects led by John A. Pearson and Jean-Omer Marchand.	Architects: Fuller & Jones (Thomas Fuller and Chilion Jones)	Neo-Gothic	Parliament Hill, Ottawa	
Library of Parliament	1858		Architects: Fuller & Jones (Thomas Fuller and Chilion Jones)	Victorian High Gothic	Parliament Hill, Ottawa	
Langevin Block (renamed Office of the Prime Minister and Privy Council in 2017)	1858	The building is a National Historic Site of Canada and was recognized as a Classified Federal Heritage Building in 1988.	Architects: Thomas Fuller and Henry Langley	Second Empire	Parliament Hill, Ottawa	
Victoria Tower	1866	The tower was destroyed during the great fire of the Centre Block on 3 February 1916. Its replacement, the Peace Tower, was built on the same location but the design (larger clock face, ornamental High Victorian Gothic vs. simpler Modern Gothic) and height were radically changed. The original tower bore some similarities to the tower at the Parliament Building in Quebec (which is still standing). The Victoria Tower Bell is the only relic remaining from the Victoria Tower.	Architect: Thomas Fuller	Neo-Gothic	Parliament Hill, Ottawa	
Royal Military College of Canada Gatehouse 1, Building R2	1884	A Recognized Federal Heritage Building 1994	Architect: Thomas Fuller		Point Frederick, Kingston	
Royal Military College of Canada Gatehouse 2, Building R6	1884	A Recognized Federal Heritage Building 1994	Architect: Thomas Fuller		Point Frederick, Kingston	
Former Brockville Post Office	1886	Designated a National Historic Site of Canada in 1983	Architect: Thomas Fuller	Flemish, Queen Anne and classical elements	14 Court House Avenue, Brockville	
Old Galt Post Office building	1887	Designated a National Historic Site of Canada in 1983	Architect: Thomas Fuller; Builder: M.A. Piggott	Romanesque, Gothic and Second Empire	12 Water Street South, Cambridge	
Royal Military College of Canada Administration Building, former Hospital, Building 55	1887	Designated a Recognized Federal Heritage Building in 1994	Architect: Thomas Fuller	Classical Revival elements	19 Valour Drive, Kingston	
Napanee Post Office	1887	A National Historic Site of Canada since 1977	Architect: Thomas Fuller	Richardson Romanesque and Victorian Eclecticism	36 Bridge Street, Greater Napanee	Napanee, Ontario Post Office
John Weir Foote Armoury	1888–1908	A National Historic Site of Canada since 1989	Architects: Thomas Fuller and David Ewart	Neo-Gothic	200 James Street North, Hamilton; 43°15′42.76″N 79°51′58.42″W	Exterior view of the John Weir Foote Armoury
Almonte Post Office	1891	A National Historic Site of Canada since 1983	Architects: Thomas Fuller and Henry Langley	Romanesque Revival	73 Mill Street, Mississippi Mills	
Toronto Armouries	1894	Demolished in 1963. A plaque in front of the Toronto Courthouse at University Avenue and Armoury Street marks the Armouries' site.	Architect: Thomas Fuller	Romanesque Revival	University Avenue, Toronto	

==== Prince Edward Island ====
Building	Year completed	Heritage status	Builder/architect	Style	Location	Image
Former Summerside Post Office	1887	A National Historic Site of Canada since 1983	Architect: Thomas Fuller	Gothic and Romanesque elements	45 Summer Street, Summerside; 46°23′36.04″N 63°47′26.32″W	

==== Quebec ====
Building	Year completed	Heritage status	Builder/architect	Style	Location	Image
Coaticook Post Office	1886–1890	A National Historic Site of Canada since 1988	Architect: Thomas Fuller		34, Rue Main Est, Coaticook	
Saint-Hyacinthe Post Office	1892	A National Historic Site of Canada since 1983	Architect: Thomas Fuller	Italianate/ Romanesque Revival	1915 Girouard Street West, Saint-Hyacinthe	

==== Saskatchewan ====
Building	Year completed	Heritage status	Builder/architect	Style	Location	Image
Government House, Regina	1891		Architect: Thomas Fuller	Italianate/ Romanesque Revival	4607 Dewdney Avenue, Regina	Government House during the Royal Visit by the future King George V and Queen Mary, then Duke and Duchess of Cornwall and York, to the then-Territories, 1901

== Family ==
In 1853 he married Caroline Anne Green, who was also from Bath; they had one son and two daughters together. Their son, Thomas W. Fuller, was also an architect, being appointed Canada's chief architect in 1927. Thomas W. Fuller's son, Thomas G. Fuller, spent more than 50 years in the building industry.

== Death and legacy ==
Fuller died on 28 September 1898, and was interred in the Beechwood Cemetery in Ottawa.

A 35 cent, three-colour Canadian postage stamp, issued in 1980, featured an image of the Parliament Buildings and the text "Royal Canadian Academy of Arts, 1880–1980, Thomas Fuller".

Several of his buildings in Bath have been threatened with demolition and other works, such as his Bradford-on-Avon Town Hall, have been converted into other uses (the Town Hall is now the St Thomas More Roman Catholic Church, Bradford-on-Avon).

In 2002, the Thomas Fuller Construction Company, founded by Fuller's grandson Thomas G. Fuller and now operated by his great-grandsons, was awarded a contract to renovate the Library of Parliament in Ottawa which he originally designed.

In 2016, the Canadian government added Fuller to their list of Persons of National Historic Significance.

== Sources ==
- Canada by Design: Parliament Hill, Ottawa at Library and Archives Canada, 28 September 2006. Retrieved 26 February 2024.

Political offices
Preceded by Thomas Seaton Scott	Chief Dominion Architect, Canada; 1881 – 1896	Succeeded by David Ewart
