= Land Titles Building (Saskatoon) =

Building in Saskatoon, Saskatchewan

Coordinates: 52.1265°N 106.6621°W

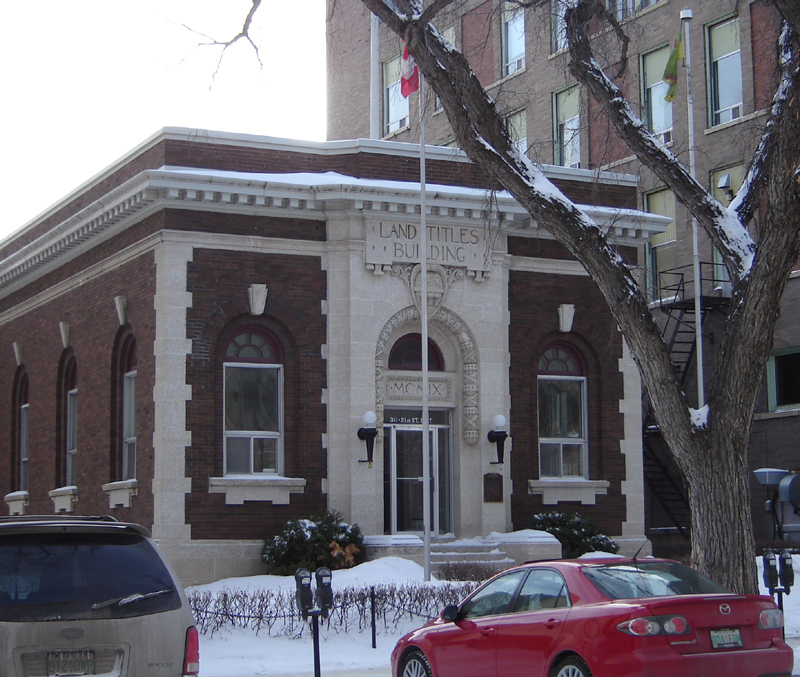
- Land Titles Building
- Interactive map of the Land Titles Building area

General information
- Architectural style: Romanesque Revival
- Location: Saskatoon, Saskatchewan, Canada
- Construction started: 1909
- Completed: 1910
- Client: Province of Saskatchewan

Design and construction
- Architect: Storey and Van Egmond

Saskatchewan Heritage Property Act
- Official name: Saskatoon Land Titles Building
- Type: Provincial Heritage Property
- Designated: March 18, 1985

The Land Titles Building is located at 311 21st Street East in the Central Business District of Saskatoon, Saskatchewan. The architectural firm of Storey and Van Egmond designed the building in the Romanesque Revival style. The building was constructed by Smith Brothers and Wilson in 1909. Additional expansions were done between 1910 and 1912. The building housed the land title office until 1959 when the office was transferred to the Law Courts Building. The provincial government stopped using the building when it was sold in 1994. The building now houses the law offices of Brayford and Shapiro.

The building was designated a Provincial Heritage Property in 1985.
