= Land Titles Building (Arcola) =

Coordinates: 49.6364°N 102.4924°W

Land Titles Building (Land Titles Office)
- Interactive map of the Land Titles Building (Land Titles Office) area

General information
- Architectural style: Georgian Classicism
- Location: 301 Main Street, Arcola, Saskatchewan, Canada
- Construction started: 1911
- Completed: 1912
- Client: Government of Saskatchewan

Design and construction
- Architect: Storey and Van Egmond

The Land Titles Building is located at 301 Main Street in Arcola, Saskatchewan, Canada. The architectural firm of Storey and Van Egmond designed the building. The building is a designated Heritage Property. The building housed land title records until the 1960s; due to the importance of these records the building was designed to be fire-proof and therefore the walls, floor, ceiling and doors were all made of metal, brick or stone.

== See also ==
Canadian Register of Historic Places
