= Dufferin Grove Park =

Public park in Toronto, Ontario, Canada

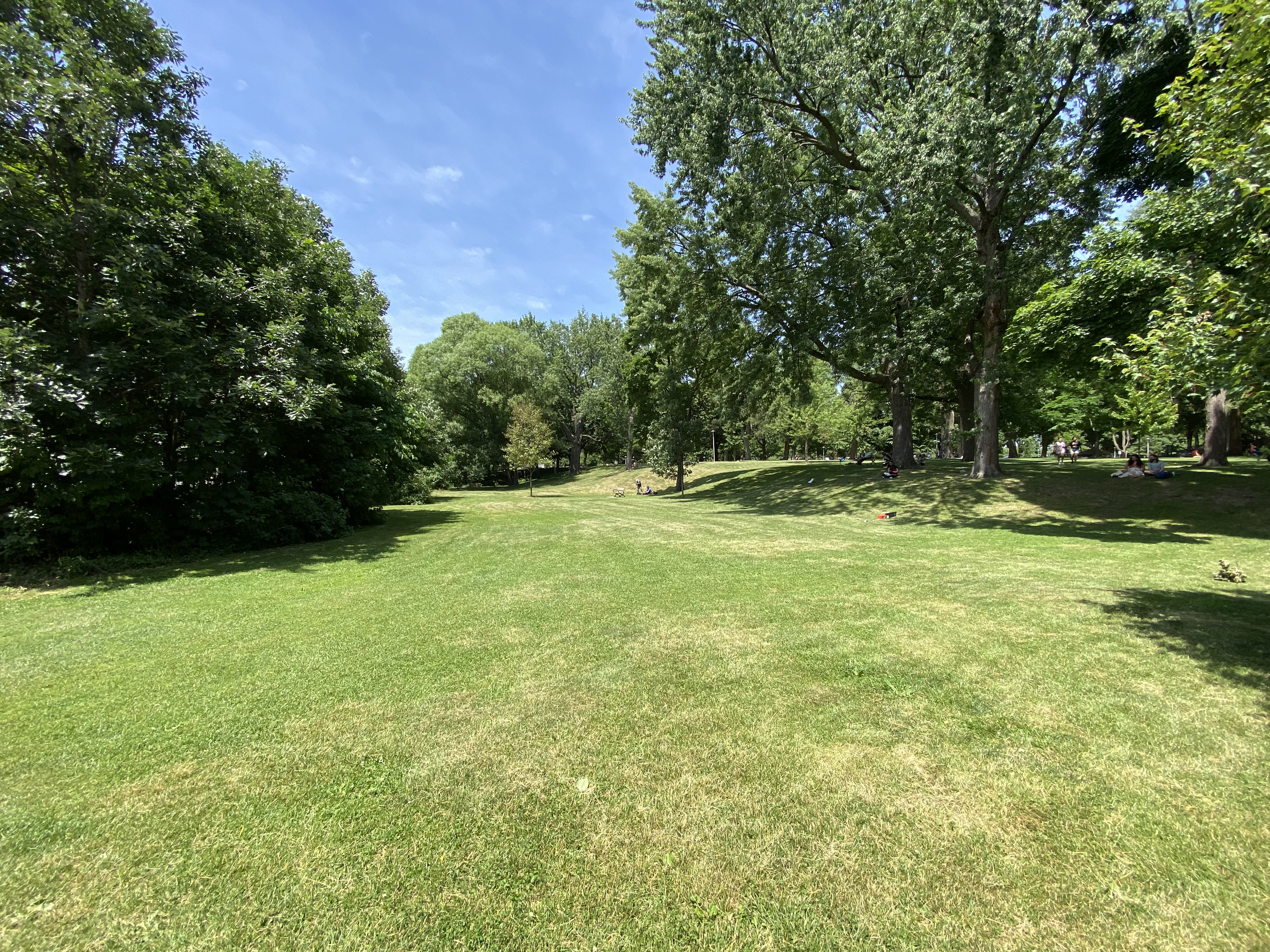
- Dufferin Grove Park

- Location within Toronto
- Type: Public Park
- Location: Toronto, Ontario
- Coordinates: 43°39′22″N 79°25′57″W
- Operator: City of Toronto
- Public transit: Dufferin

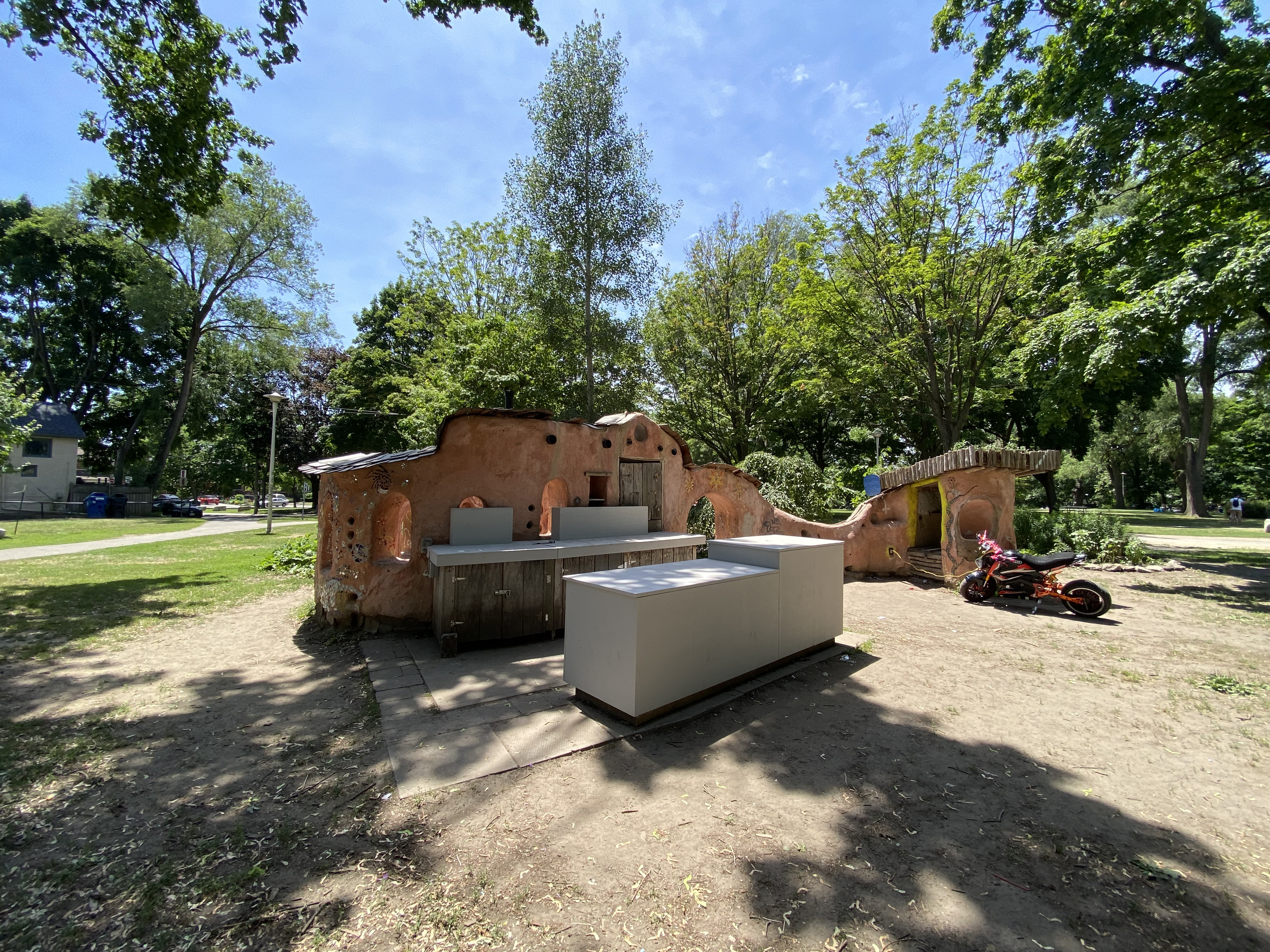
Play area

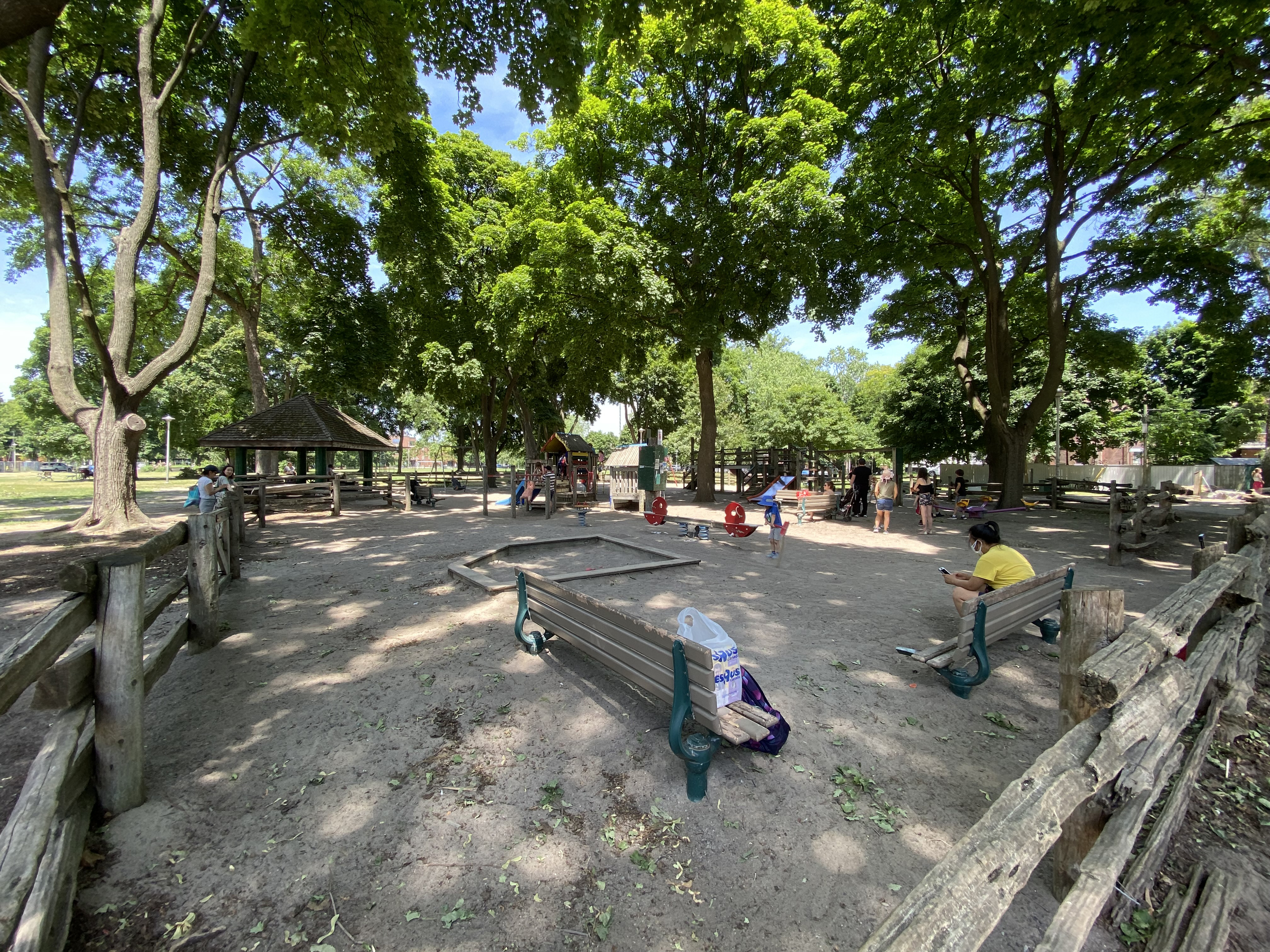
Children Playground

Dufferin Grove Park is a park in the Dufferin Grove neighbourhood of Toronto, Ontario, Canada. The park is located on the east side of Dufferin Street, south of Bloor Street West. It is located a block south of the Dufferin subway station and across the street from Dufferin Mall. The park extends two city blocks east and is primarily green-space with mixed open space and treed areas.

== Facilities and activities ==
The park features a large playground, a wading pool, a pizza oven, a basketball court, and an outdoor ice skating rink in the winter. There is also an organic farmers' market at the park on Thursday afternoons from 3-7 o'clock. The Park has been set up for wireless Internet usage. The park is home to the Clay & Paper Theatre which stages outdoor plays in the summer as well as special events at other times of the year. Amenities include a volleyball net, ping-pong table, and skating rink. The park has trees and grass, benches and picnic tables.

== Denison Creek ==
The park is situated on one part of the ravine of Denison Creek, a fork of the former Garrison Creek. In the south-west quadrant of the park, along Dufferin, a section of the ravine remains, minus the creek, which was filled in long ago. The waters of the creek are diverted into a trunk sewer that runs under Dufferin Avenue, then under Sylvan Street. An interpretative display is provided.

== Marsh Fountain & The Ruins of the Toronto Custom House ==
In 1998 artist Gene Threndyle in partnership with the Friends of Dufferin Grove Park created a series of gardens and a fountain marking the path of Denison Creek. As part of the installation, a set of large architectural ruins were relocated from High Park to Dufferin Grove Park. These ruins were identified in 2020 by artist and amateur historian Andrew Lochhead, and confirmed by Threndyle, as the long-lost remains of the second Toronto Custom House (1876-1919) designed by Richard Windeyer. The ruins, mostly keystones and some capitals, represent one of the few remaining local examples of the work of one of nineteenth century Ontario's most important and prolific architects.

Following the demolition of the Custom House in 1909 the ruins were incorporated into the Colonial (later renamed The Bay)Theatre, one of Toronto's first purpose built cinemas. When the theatre was demolished in 1966 the keystones - their origins shrouded in mystery - were meant to be installed into the facade of the Simpson Tower. However this plan was not realized and the ruins were transported to High Park and installed as ornamentation prior to being moved to Dufferin Grove.

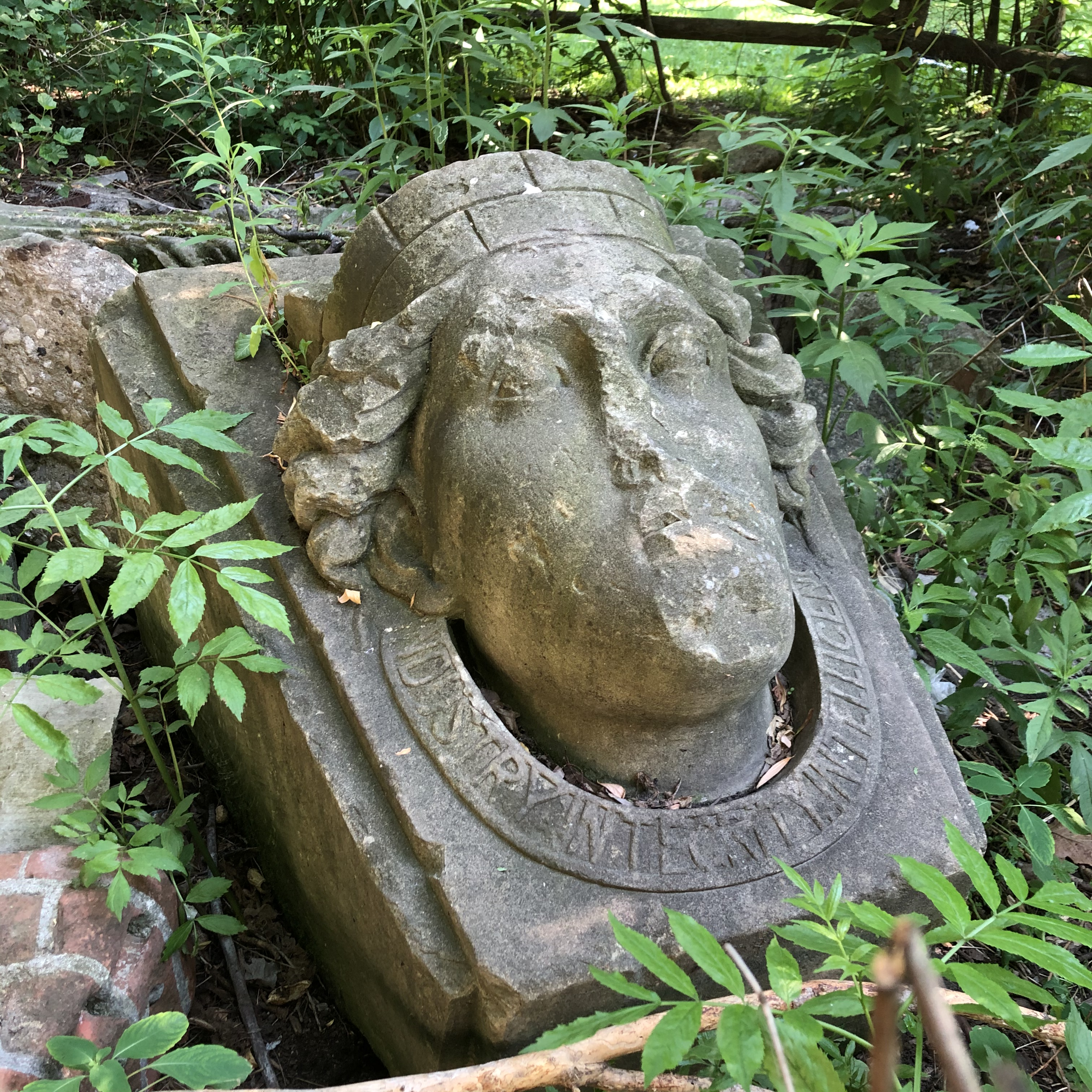
A keystone from the former Toronto Custom House (1845-1909) bearing the image of "Lady Toronto". The old city motto is emblazoned around her neck and the city's Crown Mural rests on her head. The keystone is now part of "Marsh Fountain" by artist Gene Threndyle, located in Dufferin Grove Park.
