= Double Double Land =

Performance space in Toronto, Ontario

- Interactive map of Double Double Land
- Address: 209 Augusta Ave
- Location: Kensington Market, Toronto, Ontario
- Coordinates: 43°39′14″N 79°24′5″W
- Type: Alternative exhibition space

Construction
- Opened: 2009
- Closed: June 20, 2018

Double Double Land was a performance art space and music venue in Kensington Market, Toronto, Ontario. It was founded by Jon McCurley and Daniel Vila in 2009, and was known as an eclectic underground artist-driven venue which created a space in the Toronto art scene for less conventional and less profitable projects. It closed in June 2018.

== History ==
Double Double Land was opened in 2009 by Jon McCurley and Daniel Vila. Initially located in a second floor flat at 209 Augusta Avenue, it expanded into a community-focused space with the assistance of roommates Stephen Thomas and Rob Gordon. The house required extensive clean up and renovations to address what Vila recalled in a 2014 interview as the "garbage, cockroaches, graffiti, and smashed walls" left behind by former tenants. The idea for Double Double Land was prompted by events previously held by Vila and Bonny Poon at Jamie's Area, which operated out of a basement at 193 Augusta Avenue. The first official event at Double Double Land was a reading by American poet Eileen Myles.

Over the course of Double Double Land's operation, events were organized, overseen and subsidized by a rotating number of tenants whose opened their home to local and touring artists. A multi-faceted community-focused venue, Double Double Land served a variety of roles including music venue, gallery space and comedy bar. Vila explained that the purpose of the space as "provid[ing] performance experiences that don't make sense in other places." In addition to hosting the monthly performance show Doored (2012–2015), the venue featured events and installations by artists including Petra Glynt, Le1f, New Fries, Grimes and Ian Svenonius.

In addition to being a home for off-the-beaten-path performers and artists, Double Double Land had a progressive approach to how it served the community. In 2016, it was one of Toronto's first venues to stock overdose kits in response to the growing number of fentanyl related overdoses. Double Double Land organizers also committed themselves to introducing safety measures to address the issue of sexual violence in music and arts communities following an assault at the venue in 2015. In consultation with the Toronto-based Noise Against Sexual Assault initiative, the venue added panic buttons to washrooms and changed the design of doorways in order to improve sight lines.

=== Closure ===
Double Double Land's closure was announced by Vila as part of a Facebook event announcement in late June 2018, which indicated that performances by Mary Ocher, Lief Hall, Bile Sister and Canadian Romantic would be the last at the venue. Though a reason for the closure was not disclosed, Vila indicated that the venue was being shut down by the landlord. Despite a lack of details, media coverage regarding the announcement linked the development to the pressures of Toronto's real estate market on the city's arts scene.

In writing about the impact of Double Double Land's closure on the Toronto art scene, Mark Streeter pointed to the tension between fostering unconventional art projects and profitability: "There's a reason why any city needs venues like this: they offer programming and events that are simply too risky and unprofitable for any business-minded venue to take on."
