= Kensington Market =

Neighbourhood in Toronto, Canada

- Neighbourhood
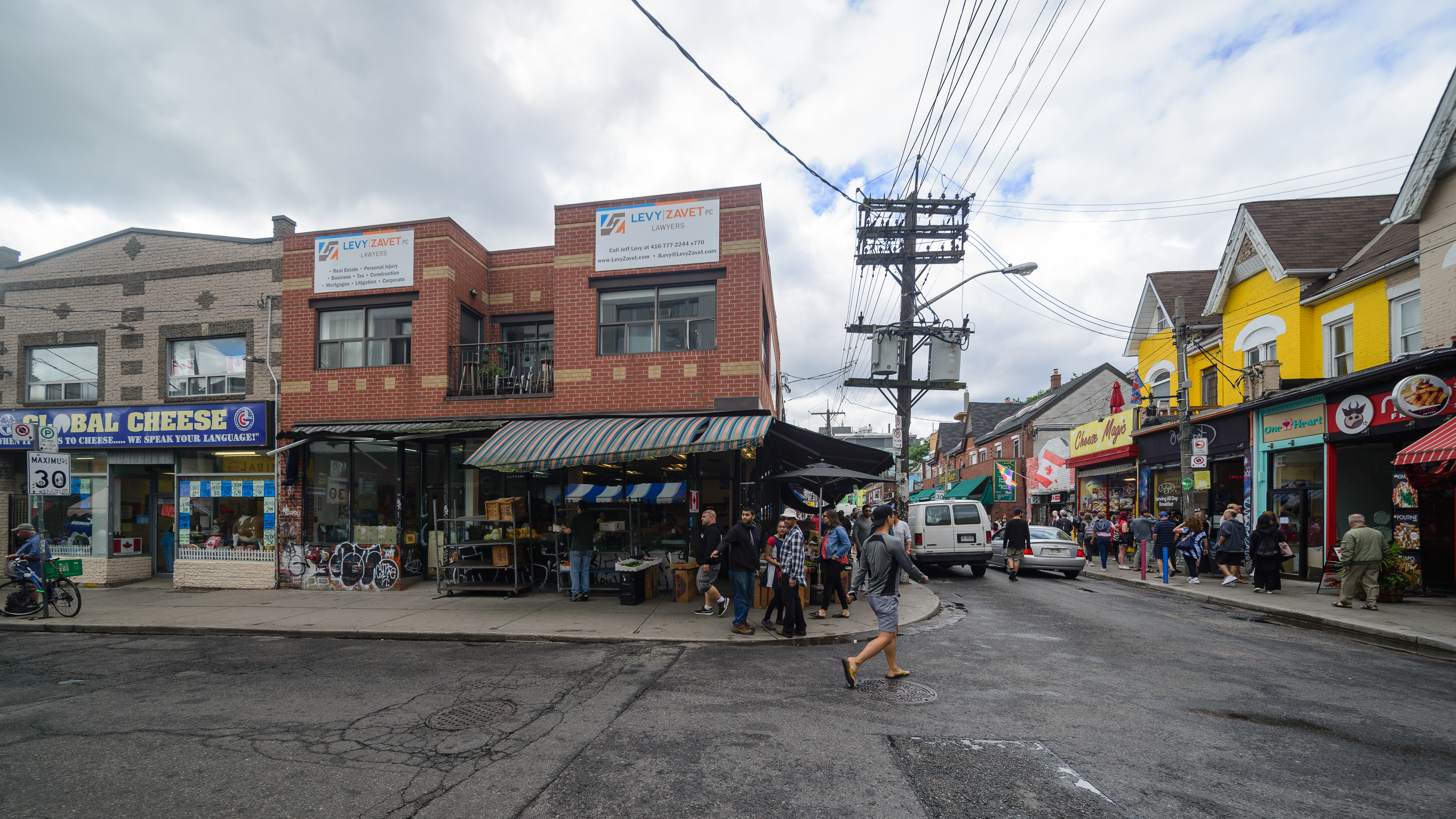
- Kensington Market at street level from Baldwin Street and Kensington Avenue

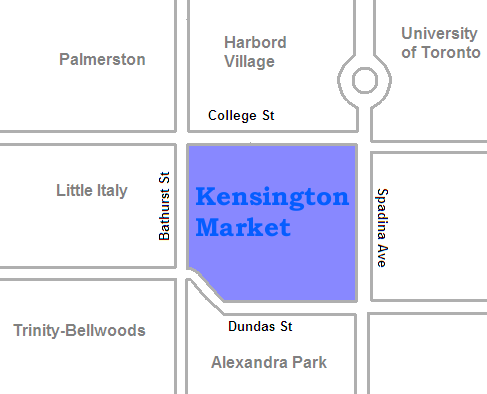

- Location within Toronto
- Coordinates: 43°39′17.18″N 79°24′02.44″W
- Country: Canada
- Province: Ontario
- City: Toronto

Government
  - MP: Danielle Martin (University—Rosedale))
  - MPP: Jessica Bell (University—Rosedale)
  - Councillor: Dianne Saxe (Ward 11 University—Rosedale)

National Historic Site of Canada
- Designated: 2006

Kensington Market is a distinctive multicultural neighbourhood in Downtown Toronto, Ontario, Canada. The Market is an older neighbourhood and one of the city's best-known. In November 2006, it was designated a National Historic Site of Canada. Robert Fulford wrote in 1999 that "Kensington today is as much a legend as a district. The (partly) outdoor market has probably been photographed more often than any other site in Toronto."

Its approximate borders are College St. on the north, Spadina Ave. on the east, Dundas St. W. to the south, and Bathurst St. to the west. Most of the neighbourhood's eclectic shops, cafes, and other attractions are located along Augusta Ave. and neighbouring Nassau St., Baldwin St., and Kensington Ave. In addition to the Market, the neighbourhood features many Victorian homes, the Kensington Community School, Bellevue Square and Toronto Western Hospital.

== History ==
=== Early history ===
George Taylor Denison, after serving in the Canadian Militia during the War of 1812, purchased an area of land in 1815 from Queen Street West to Bloor Street, roughly between where Augusta and Lippincott Streets now run. Denison used the area now known as Bellevue Square Park as a parade ground for his volunteer cavalry troop, which he commanded during the Upper Canada Rebellion. This troop later became the Governor General's Horse Guards.

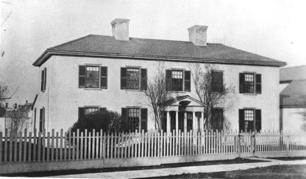
The Denison Bellevue estate c. 1885. The home was built for George Taylor Denison after he served in Canadian militia in 1815.

In 1837 a brewery opened in the area of St Andrew Street and Kensington Avenue (marked in 1858 map of the area) and after several ownership changes ceased operations in 1894.

The Denison estate was subdivided in the 1850s. During the 1880s, houses were built on small plots for Irish and Scottish immigrant labourers coming to Toronto; much of the housing is in the style of Victorian architecture row houses, which are moderate in size and exemplify true Victorian architecture. Many of these houses still stand along Wales Avenue and elsewhere, and these homes have been inhabited by many waves of immigrants in the decades that followed. Housing found closer to the market area tends to feature retail at the front of the house.

During the early twentieth century, Kensington became populated by eastern European Jewish immigrants and some Italians, who moved there from "The Ward", an overcrowded immigrant-reception area between Yonge Street and University Avenue. The Ward was a cluster of densely packed houses and was one of the poorer areas of the city. The Ward's residents moved west of Spadina Ave to enjoy less population density, better housing conditions, and opportunities to create storefront businesses.

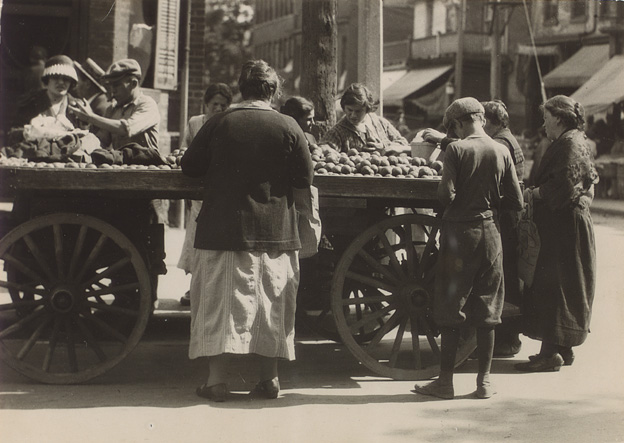
Jewish market day on Kensington Avenue, c. 1924. During the early-20th century, the area became populated by eastern European Jewish and Italian immigrants.

In the 1920s, the area became known as "the Jewish Market". Jewish merchants operated small shops as tailors, furriers and bakers. Around 60,000 Jews lived in and around Kensington Market during the 1920s and 1930s, worshipping at over 30 local synagogues. From the beginning, the market sold items imported from the homelands of many immigrant communities.

=== Post-war developments ===
After the Second World War, most of the Jewish population moved north to neighbourhoods uptown or in the suburbs. During the 1950s, a large number of immigrants from the Azores, fleeing political conflict with the regime of António de Oliveira Salazar, moved into the area and further west along Dundas Street. The arrival of new waves of immigrants from the Caribbean and East Asia changed the community, making it even more diverse as the century wore on. The Vietnam War brought a number of American political refugees to the neighbourhood, and particularly to nearby Baldwin Village, adding a unique utopian flavour to local politics. As Chinatown is located just east of Kensington, the Chinese are now the largest ethnic group. During the 1980s and 1990s, identifiable groups of immigrants came from Central America, Somalia, Ethiopia, Sudan, Iran, Vietnam, Chile and other global trouble spots.

In the 1960s there were plans to tear down the densely packed small houses and replace them with large, apartment-style housing projects, as was done to neighbouring Alexandra Park. These plans came to an end with the election of David Crombie as Mayor of Toronto. Crombie was strongly opposed to the massive urban restructuring plans that had been in vogue in previous decades.

=== Recent development ===
The market resisted the recession of the 1980s partially thanks to a floating population of students attending George Brown College, which was where the Kensington Lofts are today. George Brown College sold the property in the mid-1990s and without the extra student traffic, many stores were victims of the recession of the mid to late 90s. In addition, many Portuguese store owners were by that time too old to continue working their small shops, which led to abundant vacancy and invited a new wave of immigrant entrepreneurs. Businesses like Jumbo Empanadas, La Perola, El Emporio Latino and El Buen Precio took advantage of the growing wave of Latin American immigrants and opened the door to offering ethnic street foods. In 2000, a young couple of entrepreneurs opened the first taqueria in Canada, calling it "El Trompo".

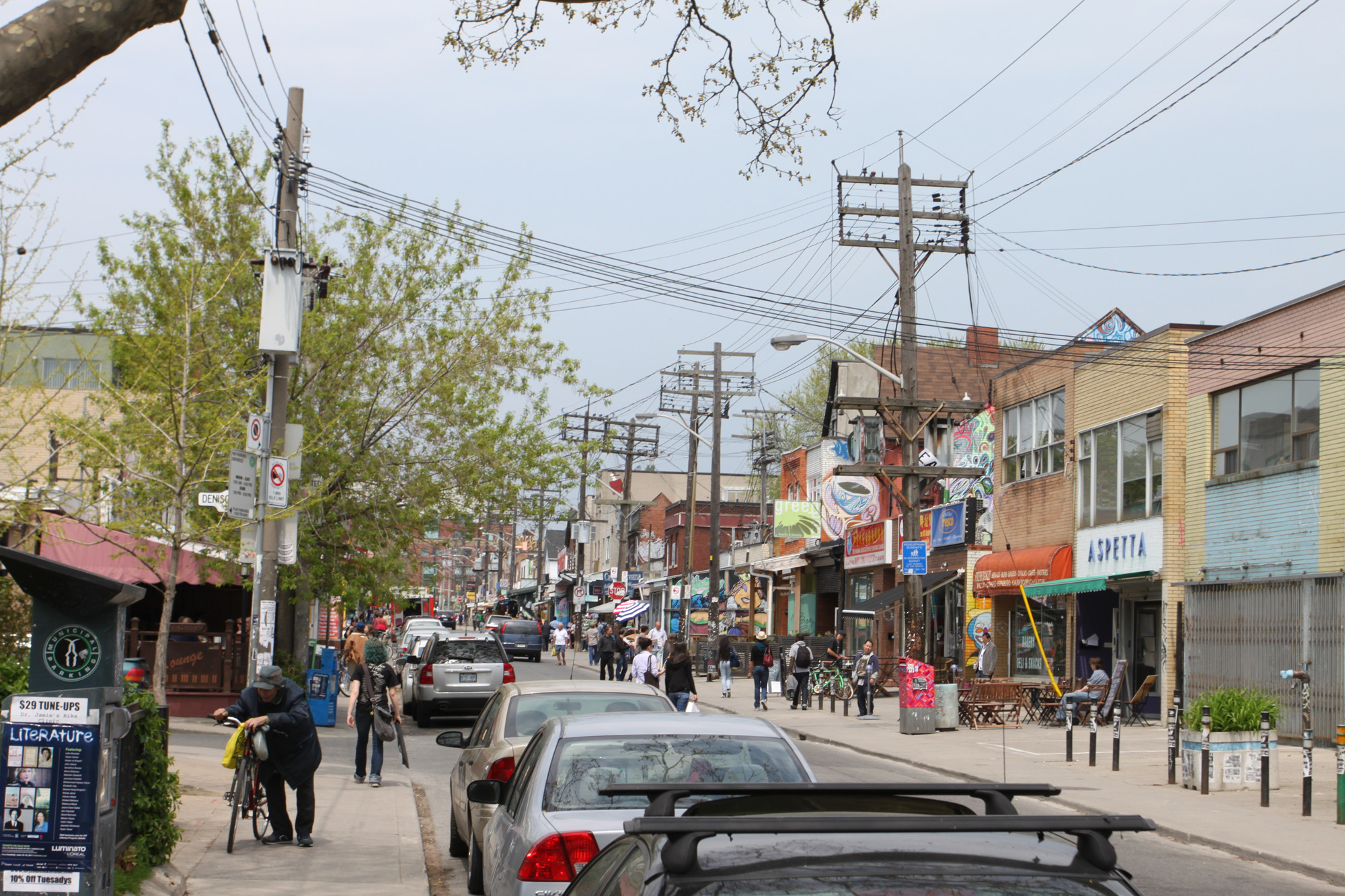
The arrival of new businesses in the mid to late-1990s led to the revitalization of Augusta Avenue.

All this movement lead to a rebirth of Augusta Avenue.. A Nike store tried to open up in the market and the community rejected it very strongly by dumping dozens of running shoes splattered with red paint in protest for the treatment Nike's workers receive around the world.

Today the neighbourhood is a noted tourist attraction, and a centre of Toronto's cultural life as artists and writers moved into the area. Land prices in the area have increased sharply, but despite its increased appeal to professionals, Kensington remains a predominantly working-class, immigrant community. In 2021, after a year of neighbourhood organizing to resist the eviction and displacement of residents of a 3-storey building, a local Community Land Trust was able to purchase the building and preserve the affordable rents provided. The Kensington Market Community Land Trust continues to own and operate the building as of 2024.

Kensington is protected by a variety of policies, mainly to enhance the atmosphere that is unique to the neighbourhood. In November 2006, Kensington Market was proclaimed a National Historic Site of Canada. Toronto's "Official Plan", which is the vision for the city until 2026, does not designate much change for the neighbourhood as seen in its land use map for the neighbourhood.

In addition to the Official Plan, Kensington is subject to "Site and Area Specific Policy." The policies which relate to proposed developments state, "Any public or private developments and work should be consistent with the special characteristics of the area." The new developments must adhere to these guidelines which include:

- low-scale buildings with retail at grade (street level);
- minimal setbacks;
- open-air display of goods on the boulevard.

== Characteristics ==
=== Cars and pedestrians ===
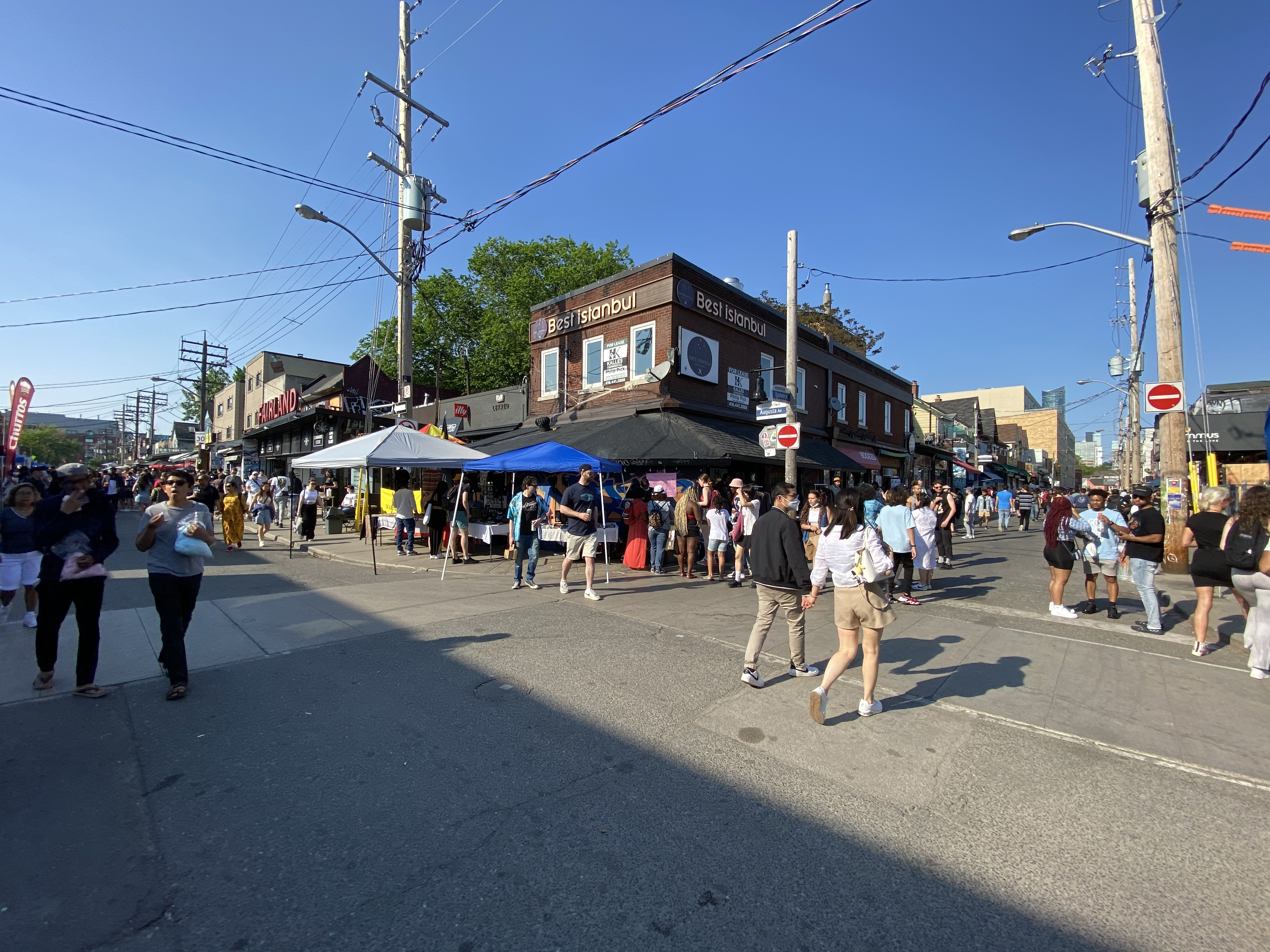
On Sundays in all seasons except winter, part of Kensington Market is restricted to pedestrian traffic only.

Narrow streets make the market challenging for those driving and especially parking in the neighbourhood. On Saturdays and some late afternoons, pedestrians walk freely down the middle of the street or between slow-moving cars. In the 2006 Canadian Census, 34.59% of Kensington residents walked to work, compared to 7.10% of City of Toronto residents. When considering the car, 15.70% of Kensington residents used a vehicle to get to work, whereas 49.39% City of Toronto residents drove a vehicle to commute to work.

Since 2004, residents and businesses have organized a series of Pedestrian Sunday events. Parts of Augusta St., Baldwin St. and Kensington Ave. are closed to motorized traffic and the streets become a pedestrian mall. Live music, dancing, street theatre and games are among the special events on the closed streets. Typically taking place on the last Sunday of every month, this type of event has been organized on half a dozen weekends a year since 2005.

=== Commercial gentrification ===
A small supermarket, Zimmerman's Freshmart, opened in the Market in February 2005, leading to some controversy. Danny Zimmerman, the cousin of Freshmart's owner and the owner of a rival store across the street, expressed concern it would compete with smaller businesses, or would otherwise lead to a more "corporate" market. Zimmerman's Freshmart closed in 2016. The arrival of COBS Bread in 2006 continues this potential trend, though COBS shuttered in 2014 and was replaced by the independent Black Bird Bakery.

=== Landmarks ===
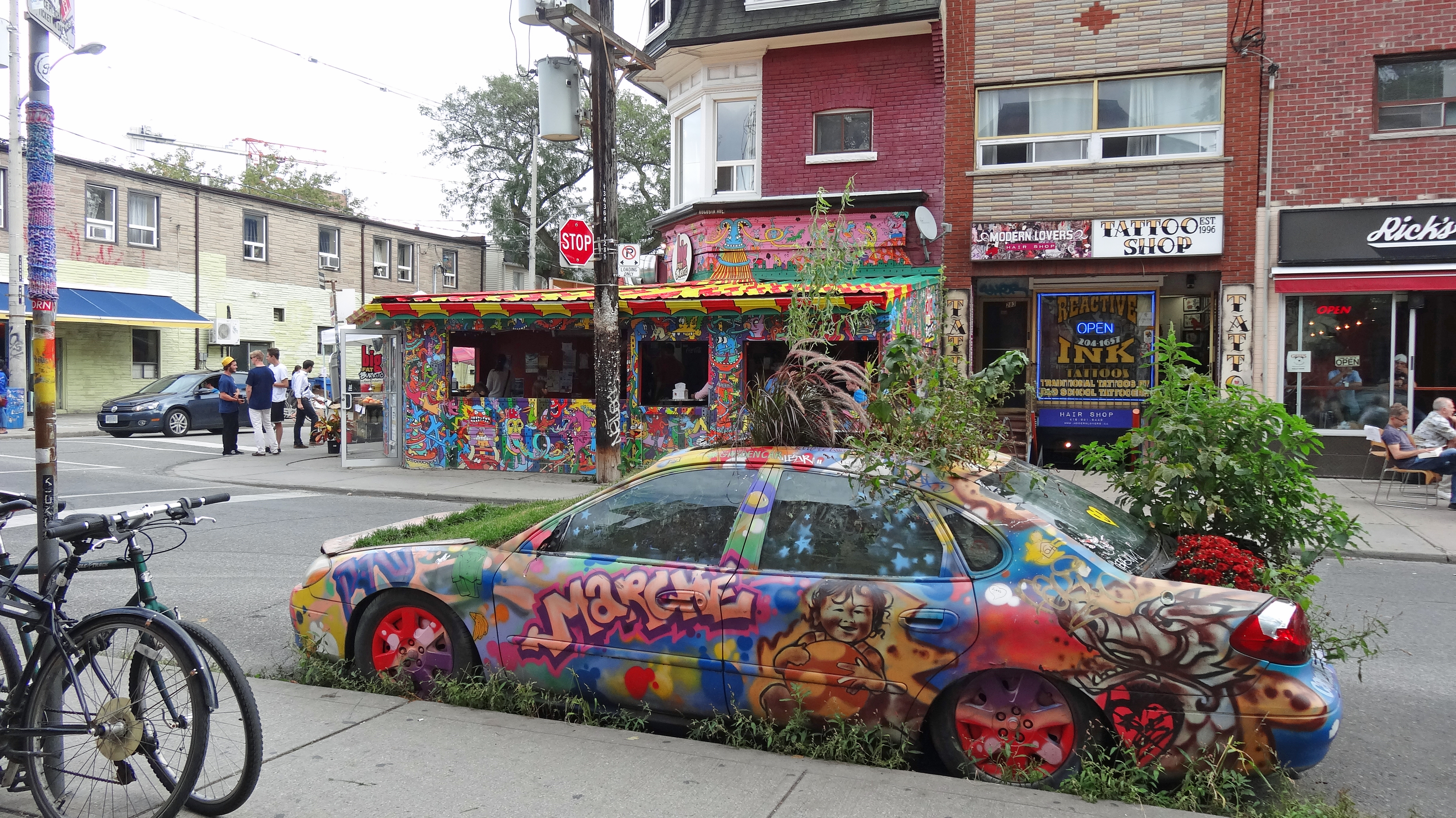
The Garden Car has been situated in Kensington Market since 2007, and is a public art piece that also doubles as a community garden.

Some notable landmarks include the Number 8 Fire Station, Tom's Place, Bellevue Square Park with a statue of actor Al Waxman, and St. Stephen's Community House. Percy Faith, the 1950s composer and band leader, lived as a child at 171 Baldwin Street. His uncle, Louis Roterbergh, a master violinist, taught him the violin, and was reputed to play at the house at Baldwin as crowds gathered below to listen. Bellevue Square contains a plaque given to Kensington Market in 2006 officially recognizing it as a national historic site.

A non-permanent landmark of Kensington Market is the Garden Car, which has been a staple of the neighbourhood since 2007. Originally built in 2006 by local advocacy group Streets are for People, the car is a public art piece that doubles as a community garden. There have been 3 cars since the inception of the first Garden Car.

=== Shops ===
The area is filled with a mix of food stores selling an immense variety of meats, fish and produce. There are also several bakeries, spice and dry goods stores, and cheese shops. Stores sell a wide variety of new and used clothing, and there are discount and surplus stores. It is also home to many restaurants covering a wide variety of styles and ethnicities. A unique architectural feature of the neighbourhood are the extensions built onto the front of many buildings (which would be against by-laws in other places). In recent years, the neighbourhood has seen a small explosion of upscale cafés, restaurants and clubs, replacing many of the older ethnic businesses. There has been much speculation that Kensington's long history as an immigrant working-class neighbourhood is near its end.

==== Counterculture ====
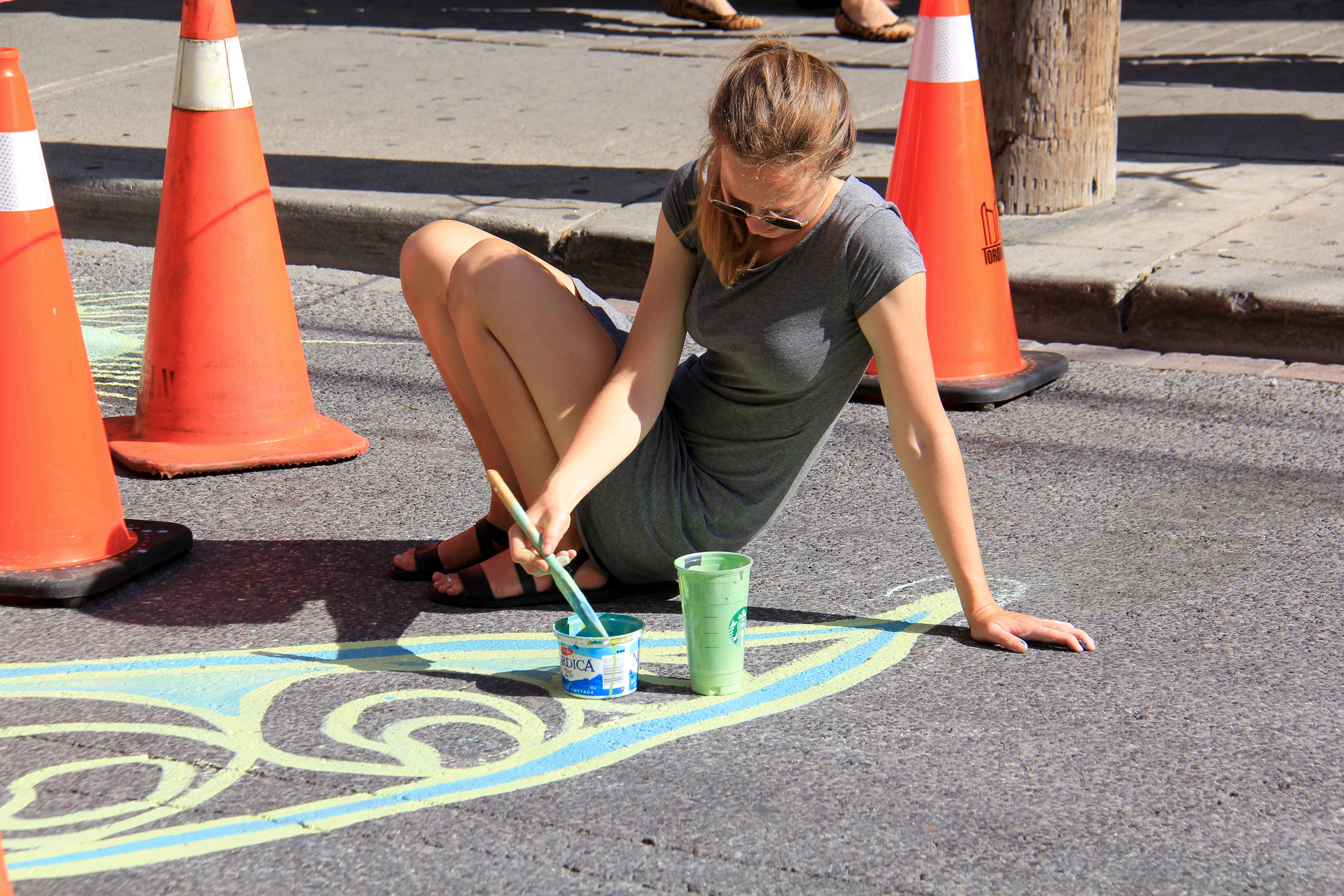
Street painting in Kensington Market

Businesses such as Manifestudio, a photo gallery and eco-politics community space run by GlobalAware Independent Media, help create an environment friendly to radical politics. Trotskyists are sometimes seen handing out pamphlets at the corner of Baldwin and Kensington. Over the past two decades, several alternative bookstores have flourished in Kensington Market, including Who's Emma, the Anarchist Free Space, and Uprising Books.

One of Canada's most famous independent bookstores, This Ain't the Rosedale Library, also moved to Kensington from Church and Wellesley in 2008. It later closed in June 2010, failing to pay rent.

Performance spaces like Bread & Circus (2009–2011), Double Double Land (2009–2018) and Videofag (2012–2016) also contribute to Kensington Market's independent arts scene.

== Culture ==
=== Festivals ===
The annual "Kensington Market Festival of Lights", which is now known as the Kensington Market Winter Solstice Festival, is celebrated as a parade on the streets of Kensington Market during the Winter Solstice in December. This carnival parade of giant puppets, firebreathers, stiltwalkers and samba musicians was created and founded by Ida Carnevali in 1987 as a way of beckoning the return of the sun on the longest night of the year. Artists and groups such as the Samba Squad, Shadowland Theatre, Clay & Paper Theatre, Richard Underhill, the Befana Choir and the Kensington Horns participate in this event. For many years, the parade ended in a post-sunset concert and spectacle in Bellevue Square; since 2009, the parade has ended at Alexandra Park to handle the larger crowd.

The Pedestrian Sundays festival is a car-free festival where the streets close to cars in several Sundays in the summer. The festival ran for five years, attracting many people to party on the streets of Kensington Market, including bands, street foods, etc.

Bellevue Square Park hosts many concerts and festivals throughout late spring and summer. In addition, the Chiaroscuro Reading Series is held the second Tuesday of each month at Augusta House. Prominent science fiction, fantasy, and horror authors offer readings of their works.

=== Kensington in popular culture ===
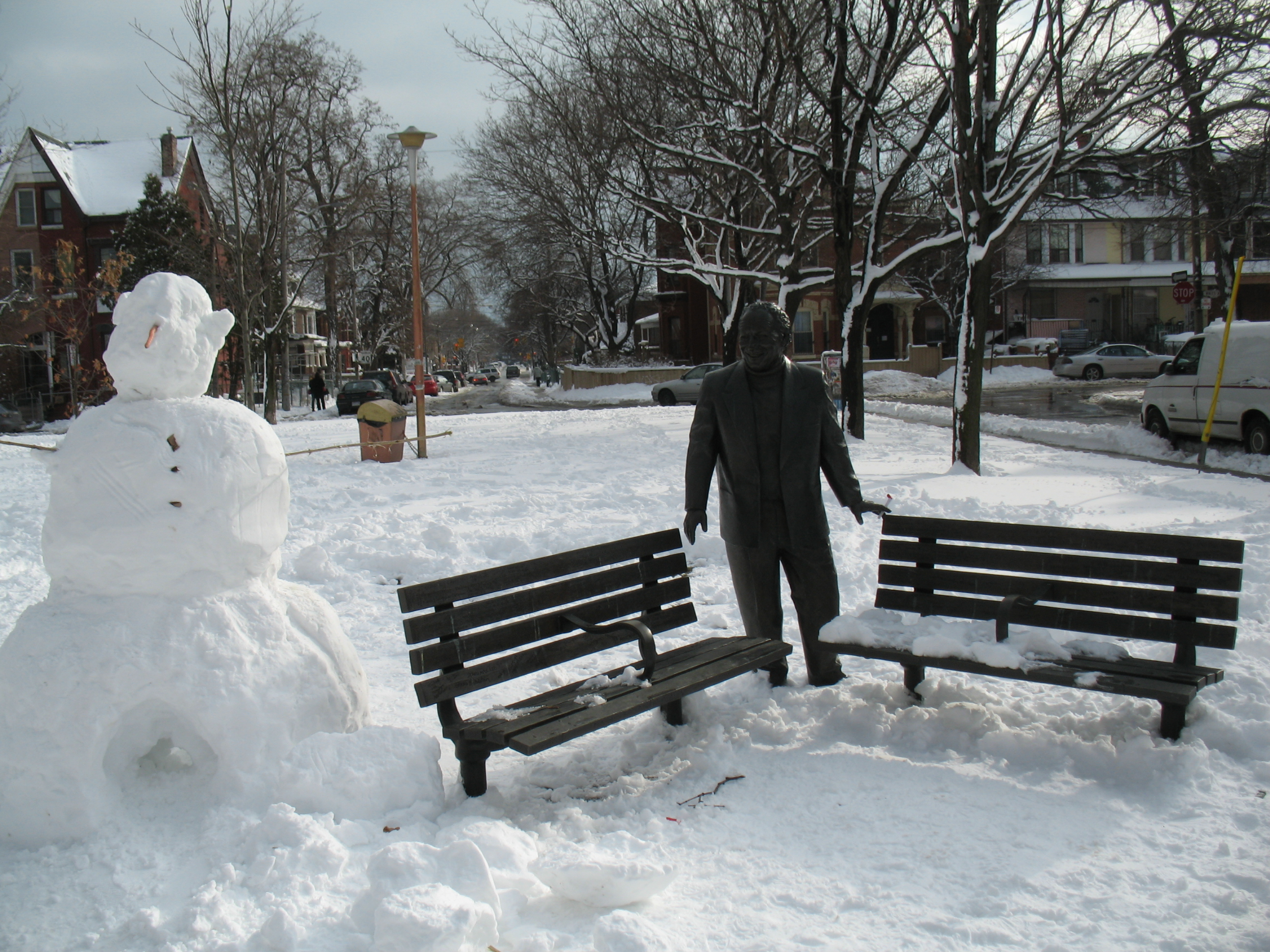
A statue of Al Waxman, a local who was raised in the area, and starred in CBC Television's King of Kensington

Former Toronto mayor Mel Lastman and actor Al Waxman (who starred in the CBC Television series King of Kensington) were both born and raised in the Kensington Market neighbourhood. After Waxman's death in 2001, he was honoured with a statue in the north-west corner of Bellevue Square Park. In addition to King of Kensington, Kensington Market has been the setting for the television series Twitch City, which was filmed above the record store Paradise Bound, and Katts and Dog as well as the street riot scenes of the 1984 comedy Police Academy. Kensington Market was the primary setting for Cory Doctorow's novel Someone Comes to Town, Someone Leaves Town.

Canadian singer-songwriter Murray McLauchlan mentions Kensington Market in his 1975 song "Down By The Henry Moore."

Kids' CBC, the daily children's programming block on CBC Television, includes some interstitial segments featuring Mamma Yamma, who owns a vegetable stand in Kensington Market. Played by puppeteer Ali Eisner, Mamma Yamma teaches children about food-related subjects such as nutrition, table manners and basic mathematics, and also often incorporates celebrity and musical guests.

== Demographics ==
Census tract 0038.00 of the 2006 Canadian census covers Kensington Market. In the time between these censuses, the population of Kensington Market grew by 1.08% from being 3,740 in 2006 to rising to 4,029 in 2011 (Census 2006, Census 2011). The 2006 Canadian census revealed that the average family income in Kensington was $61,339, compared to the City of Toronto which has an average family income of $96,602.00. The 2006 Canadian census also revealed that the average income for individuals was $23, 335, whereas in 2011 with a GNR% of 29.4%, the average individual income was $26, 403. This is relatively low in comparison to the average individual income calculated for Ontario, being $38,099 in 2006, and in 2011 with a GNR% of 27.1% the Ontarian average income was $42,264 (Census 2006, Census 2011). In addition, 71.6% of the population of this census tract earned under $50,000 (Census 2006) in 2006. This is comparable to the 78.2% of the population that earned under $50,000 (Census 2011) in the following census year i.e. 2011. It is noteworthy that a shocking 22.8% of the census tract population earned under $10,000 in 2006 (Census 2006) which increased to 27.4% in 2011 (Census 2011).

Additionally, the prevalence of low income before tax is substantially higher in Kensington at 39.5% compared to the City of Toronto at 20.6% (Census 2006, Census 2011). The 10 most common languages spoken at home, after English are:

1. Cantonese - 14.3%
2. Unspecified Chinese - 13.4%
3. Mandarin - 9.4%
4. Portuguese - 4.8%
5. Vietnamese - 2.7%
6. Spanish - 1.5%
7. Korean - 0.7%
8. Urdu - 0.3%
9. Polish - 0.3%
10. Serbian - 0.3%

The median income for CT 5350038 Kensington Market in 2006 was $15464 and the median income for the 2011 NHS voluntary long-form census with a GNR percentage of 29.4 was $16997. This shows an increase in the median income from 2006 to 2011. There is a $1,533 increase or a +9.9% increase of change compared to the 2006 median income.

Year	Population
2006	3740
2011	4029

Source: Statistics Canada, 2006; Statistics Canada 2011

2011 GNR % 29.4

Kensington has a lot of diversity, particularly a large Chinese ethnicity due to its close proximity to Chinatown. 47.5% of Kensington's population is Chinese, compared to 10% in Toronto overall. 7% of Kensington Market's population is from other parts of Asia, 3% Latin, 0.5% Arab, 3% Black, and 39% of the population is Caucasian. The diversity of Kensington Market's population is seen in the generation status of its population in Census Tract 535.0038.00. In 2011 the National Household Survey found, 58% of Kensington Market's population were first-generation Canadians, 17% were second-generation Canadians and 25% were third-generation Canadians or more. Kensington Market in 2011 had 2240 first-generation Canadians, 655 second-generation Canadians and 985 third-generation Canadians or more.

The Global Non-Response Rate (GNR) for the 2011 National Household Survey (NHS) for census tract 5350038.00, Kensington Market, was 29.4% (Census 2011).

According to Stats Canada, the population of Kensington Market increased by approximately 300 people (or 7%) from 3,740 in 2006 to 4,029 in 2011. Breaking this number down into generation status, it has been found that first-generation residents increased by 75 and second-generation residents increased by 20. The remaining 200 or so residents of the area are placed in the third generation or more category. Thus, the number of third-generation or more residents increased significantly from 2006 to 2011. In terms of percentages, from 2006 to 2011, first-generation residents dropped about 7% from 64.92% to 57.73%. Second generation residents decreased slightly from 19.04% in 2006 to 16.88% in 2011 while the percentage of third-generation or more residents increased dramatically from 16.04% in 2006 to 25.39% in 2011, which represents approximately a 10% increase in residents from this generation status. (Census/NHS 2011, Census 2006)

=== Canadian Citizenship ===
According to the 2006 Canadian Census (0038.00 census tract), approximately 76% of the residents at Kensington Market are Canadian citizens. Of that 76%, 9% are under the age of 18. This means that 24% of Kensington Market's population is non-Canadian citizens, a figure that speaks to Kensington Market's character as a hub for multiculturalism. Furthermore, in 2011 the National Household Survey reported very similar data. Although the population accounted by citizenship status increased from 2006 and 2011, the percentage of those with Canadian citizenship versus those without the citizenship remained the same. In 2006, 2800 residents reported that they were Canadian citizens whereas 870 residents reported they did not hold Canadian citizenship.

In 2011, 2950 residents reported they were Canadian citizens whereas 930 residents reported that they did not hold Canadian citizenship. Comparing this to the Canadian ratio between Canadian and non-Canadian citizenship data from the census for 2006 and 2011 the ratio changed by 0.4% resulting in an increase in non-Canadian citizens within the population that received the long-form survey and the National Household Survey (Census 2006; Census 2011 NHS). Although this per cent increase is small, when speaking on the national scale, this 0.4% increase in ratio involved 32,852,320 respondents for 2011 and 31,241,030 respondents for 2006 (Census 2006; Census 2011). Comparing that with the minimal increase which was 0.3% in ratio for Kensington where the population was not as substantial, this increase is not as substantial as well (Census 2006; Census 2011 NHS).

=== Housing status ===
Census tract 0038.00 of the 2006 Canadian Census and 2011 Canadian census revealed information about the population's housing status in the Kensington Market neighbourhood. According to the former source, 59% of the population or 940 out of 1595 people were renting their homes. The latter source reported that the percentage increased to 64% (1135 out of 1765 people).

=== Religion ===
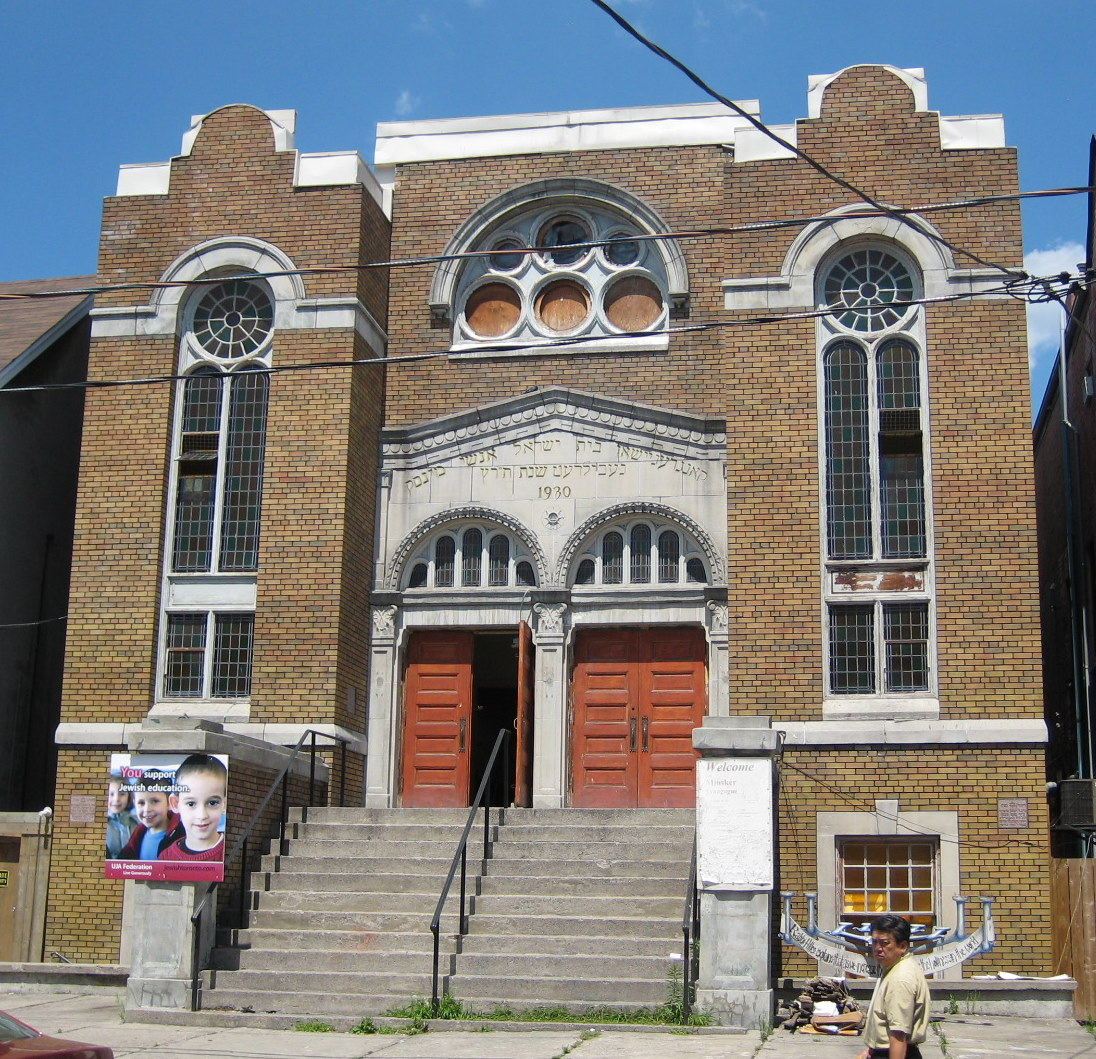
Opened in 1927, Anshei Minsk is one of two synagogues in the area.

Two synagogues remain in the Market from the early 20th-century period when the area was the centre of Toronto's Jewish community: Anshei Minsk on St. Andrews Street and the Kiever Synagogue on Bellevue Avenue.

In recent years Kensington Market has been associated with the Rastafari movement. There are several stores situated around the Market that sell Rastafarian cultural items, including a small flea-market. The winter solstice festival, formally known as the Kensington Market Festival of Lights, occurs annually and is an important gathering of Ontario's pagan community.

== See also ==
- List of neighbourhoods in Toronto
- No. 8 Hose Station
- St. Lawrence Market
- History of the Jews in Toronto
