= No. 8 Hose Station =

Fire hall in Toronto, Canada

Coordinates: 43.656747°N 79.404797°W

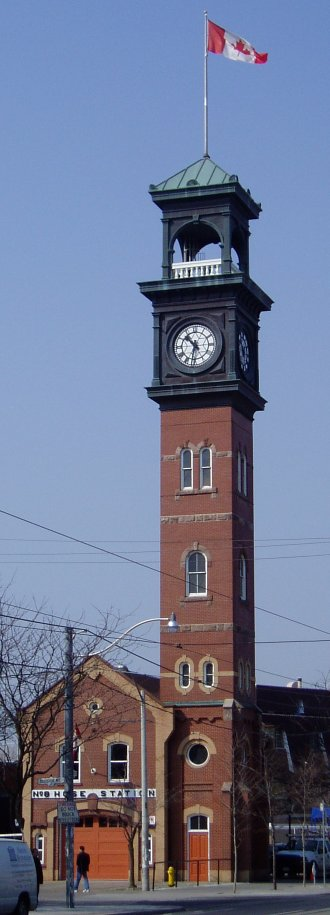
No. 8 Hose Station

The No. 8 Hose Station is a small fire hall that is a Toronto landmark. It is located on College Street at Bellevue and marks the northern end of Kensington Market and serves the Chinatown area at Spadina and Dundas.

== History ==
The hall was built in 1878 as part of the transformation of the Toronto Fire Department that saw it move from a volunteer to a professional organization. The station was home to horse drawn hose car. The clock tower, that quickly became a symbol of the neighbourhood, was added in 1899. From the top of the tower a lookout would watch for fires. It was also useful for hanging hoses to dry. In 1911 it received the city's first motorized fire engine.

== Demolition pressure and fire ==
In the 1960s most of the old fire houses were demolished, but community pressure saved the firehall. The building was being renovated and the hall’s firecrew were moved to another firehall about two weeks before the 28 May 1972 fire. Arson was suspected and destroyed the tower’s wooden and copper roof, melted the clock, but left the brickwork relatively undamaged. Again the community assured its survival and the building was rebuilt almost exactly as it had been before. The addition that stored the aerial ladder was replaced with the modern 3 bay addition that now houses the station's trucks.

== See also ==
- Toronto Fire Services
