= Clay & Paper Theatre =

Community theatre company in Ontario, Canada

- Company type: Non Profit
- Industry: Entertainment: Community Art
- Founded: 1994
- Founder: David Anderson (artist)
- Headquarters: Toronto, Ontario, Canada
- Area served: Toronto
- Key people: David Anderson(artist), Founder
- Website: www.clayandpapertheatre.org

Clay & Paper Theatre is a community arts theatre company in Toronto, Ontario, Canada that produces narrative theatre using large-scale puppets, masks, stilts, visual imagery, music, and poetry. A fundamental component of Clay & Paper Theatre's mandate is social inclusion.

== Origins ==
Clay & Paper Theatre was founded in 1994 by its artistic director, David Anderson. David helped to establish the organization in community-centered Dufferin Grove Park, Toronto, where they have a small workshop and storage facility.

== Festivals ==
Clay & Paper Theatre delivers an annual multidisciplinary summer festival called Day of Delight. Coinciding with summer solstice, Day of Delight is a celebration of love, courtship and desire.

== Plays ==
Each summer, Clay & Paper Theatre produces a new Canadian play which runs for up to 5 weeks in Dufferin Grove Park. These plays are built, rehearsed and performed in full public view and admission to all performances is on a pay what you can basis.

== Community Parades ==
Occurring in late October on the Saturday before Halloween, Night of Dread is an annual community event in which giant puppets and images of fears are paraded through the streets and then burned in a bonfire at Dufferin Grove Park with live music, dancing and fire spinning. Attracting thousands of revelers, 2010 marks the eleventh annual Night of Dread celebration.

== Projects ==
Puppets Without Barriers (2009) Project Partners: Centre for Learning Technologies at Ryerson University (now Toronto Metropolitan University) and Picasso Pro. Funded by the Department of Canadian Heritage.

- An accessibility initiative to reduce barriers to audiences who are blind or deaf. Basic adaptations have been made to scripts and programs as well as additional interpretation including ASL, audio description, tactile tours, Braille and Large-print.

Cyclops: Cycling Oriented Puppet Squad (2009-current) Project Partners: Toronto Cyclists Union (now Cycle Toronto), Bike Pirates, Sweet Pete's. Funded by the Ontario Trillium Foundation.

- Clay & Paper Theatre's 3-year bicycle-based theatre project. This 4-person mobile performance squad animates and energizes environmental and cycling events across Toronto, bringing theatre and cycling enthusiasm to the unsuspecting public, drawing attention to urban environmental issues and promoting active living.

Building Local Stories (1998-current) Project Partners: Friends of Dufferin Grove Park.

== Productions ==
Art Ambulance II (2022)

Art Ambulance (2021)

The Echoes Project II: Pigeon Pie (2019)

The Echoes Project (2018)

Animal Nature (2014 - 2015)

Our Last Best Hope (2013)

Day of Delight (2013)

A History of Forgetting (2012)

The Pedaler's Wager (2010)

The Circus of Dark & Light (2010)

Night of Dread (2011)

Cycling Oriented Puppet Squad (2011)

Night of Dread (2010)

Day of Delight (2010)

Between Sea & Sky (2009)

Bicycle Revolution (2009)

Leap Year Pudding (2009)

Puppets On Ice (2009)

Song of the Innocents (2008)

Horse Feathers (2008)

Night Of Dread (2008)

Day of Delight (2008)

Night of Dread (2007)

We Need Help! (2007)

Day of Delight (2007)

Puppets on Ice (2007)

Night of Dread (2006)

Camões, the One-Eyed Poet of Portugal (2006)

Night of Dread (2005)

The Space Between (2005)

Lilith (2004)

Day of Delight (2004)

Puppets on Ice (2004)

Night of Dread (2003)

Day of Delight (2003)

Puppets on Ice (2003)

The Sylliad (2003)

GOLD in Dufferin Grove Park (2002)

Night of Dread (2002)

Night of Dread (2001)

Night of Dread (2000)

The Lost City of Wagadu (2000)

Lilith Unfair (1999)

The Ballad of Garrison Creek (1998)

Democracy (1998)

The Epic of Mael Duin (1998)

The Resurrection of Fornax (1997)

The Return of Green Man (1995 to present)

Gilgamesh (1994 to 1996)

== Awards and honors ==
2009 Davenport Community Builders Award (David Anderson)

2008 Short listed for William Kilbourn Award for the Celebration of Toronto's Cultural Life (David Anderson)

2007 Chalmers Arts Fellowship, Ontario Arts Council (David Anderson)

== See also ==
- Community art
- Community theatre
- Puppetry
- Jumblies Theatre
- Kensington Market
