= Thomas Brown Anderson =

Canadian banker (1796–1873)

The Honourable Thomas Brown Anderson
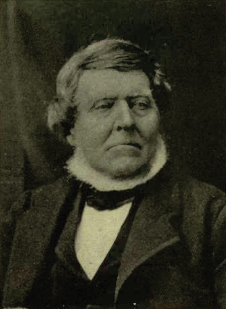
- Photograph of Thomas Brown Anderson

6th President of the Bank of Montreal
- In office June 5, 1860 – October 20, 1869
- Preceded by: Peter McGill
- Succeeded by: Edwin Henry King

Member of the Special Council of Lower Canada
- In office April 2, 1838 – June 1, 1838
- Monarch: Victoria
- Governor: John Colborne, Lord Seaton; John Lambton, Earl of Durham

Personal details
- Born: Thomas Brown Anderson; June , 1796 Edinburgh, Scotland
- Died: May 28, 1873 (aged 76) Montreal, Quebec
- Party: Tory
- Spouse: Ann Richardson (m. 1827)
- Children: Elizabeth Magdalene Anderson
- Relatives: Lt-Col. Joseph Bell Forsyth (son-in-law)
- Occupation: Merchant; Banker

Thomas Brown Anderson (June 1796 – May 28, 1873) was a Canadian merchant, banker, and philanthropist who was director, vice-president (1847–1860) and 6th president of the Bank of Montreal (1860–1869), Member of the Special Council of Lower Canada (April–June 1838) and Vice-president of the Montreal Board of Trade (1849).

== Early life ==
Anderson was born in Edinburgh, Scotland, in June 1796. Little is recorded of Anderson's early life but it is understood that he arrived in Montreal, Canada during 1827. On his arrival in Montreal, his first job was as a clerk for a commercial firm (Forsyth, Richardson and Company of Montreal) engaged in a co-partnership with Forsyth, Walker and Company of Quebec.

The firm's main business concerns were in fur trading, clothing, wholesaling provisions, local real estate, being an acting agent for the East India Company's Canadian agent, and serving as the financial repository for the Receiver General's Department of Lower Canada.

== Companies (1827–1861) ==
=== Forsyth, Richardson and Company (1827–1847) ===
Anderson's marriage to Ann Richardson, the daughter of John Richardson (the senior partner at Forsyth, Richardson and Company) undoubtedly helped in any nepotistic opportunities for him with the firm; and Anderson ended up becoming the company's last president.

In 1847, Forsyth, Richardson and Company faced a calamity from which it would not recover: the firm suffered a massive capital pull-out from its shareholders. As president, Anderson led the company through the eventual dissolution of its co-partnership with Forsyth, Walker and Company.

=== Anderson, Auldjo and Company (1847–1852) ===
With the old Company dissolved, the Montreal business was reorganized and renamed as Anderson, Auldjo and Company. Anderson was the senior partner and the others—Louis Auldjo, William Evans, and Thomas Forsyth—were clerks from the old firm.

=== Anderson, Evans and Company (1852–1858) ===
When Louis Auldjo departed the company to start his own in 1852, the result was another reorganization and renaming of the firm as Anderson, Evans and Company, hardware merchants and importers.

=== Anderson, Evans and Evans (1858–1861) ===
The addition of new partners, Samuel Evans and Thomas Evans, entailed another reorganization and renaming of the company in 1858 as Anderson, Evans and Evans. This partnership was finally dissolved in 1861 when Anderson decided to focus on banking.

== Bank of Montreal (1830–1869) ==
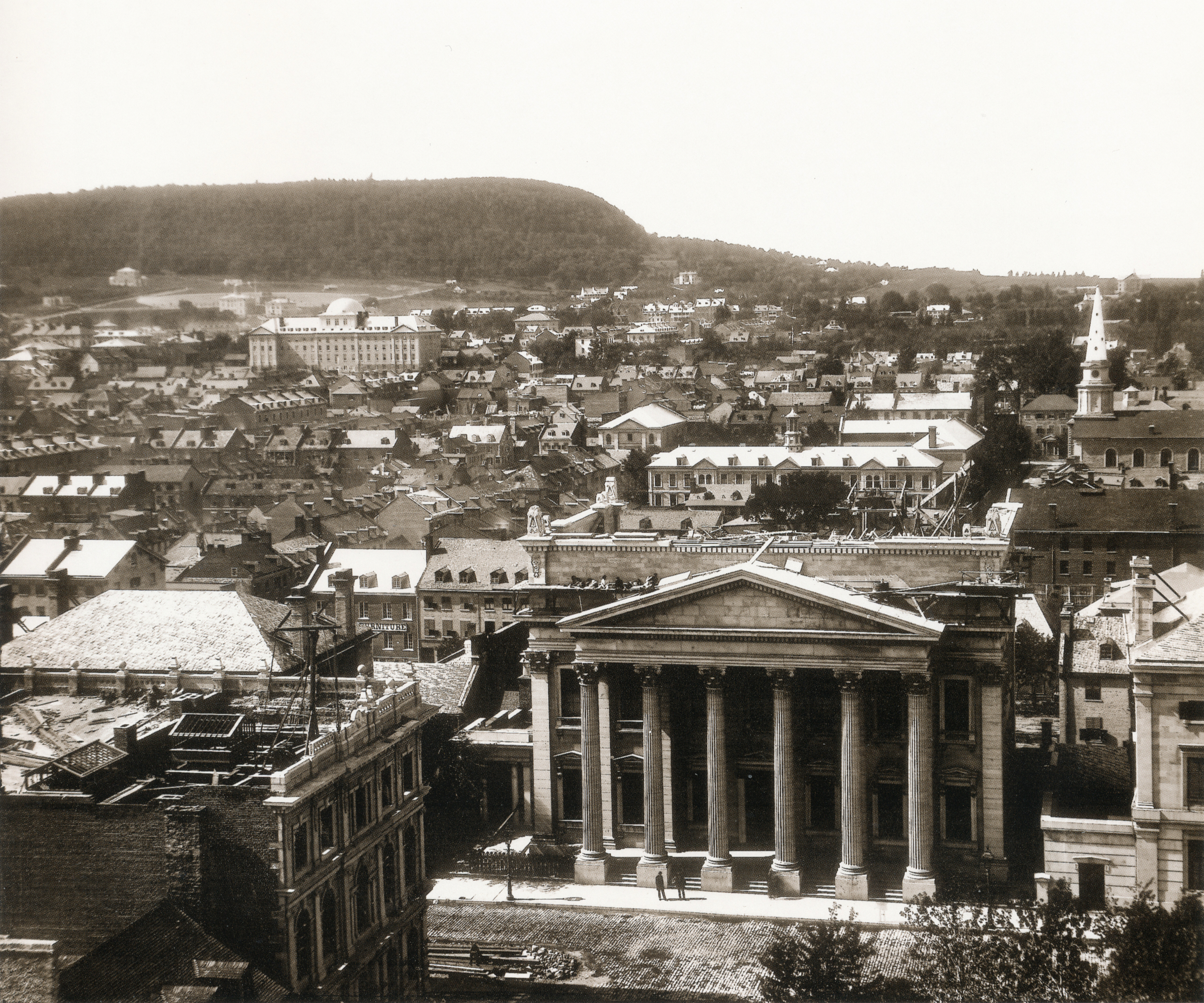
The Bank of Montreal (Banque de Montréal) under construction (1859)

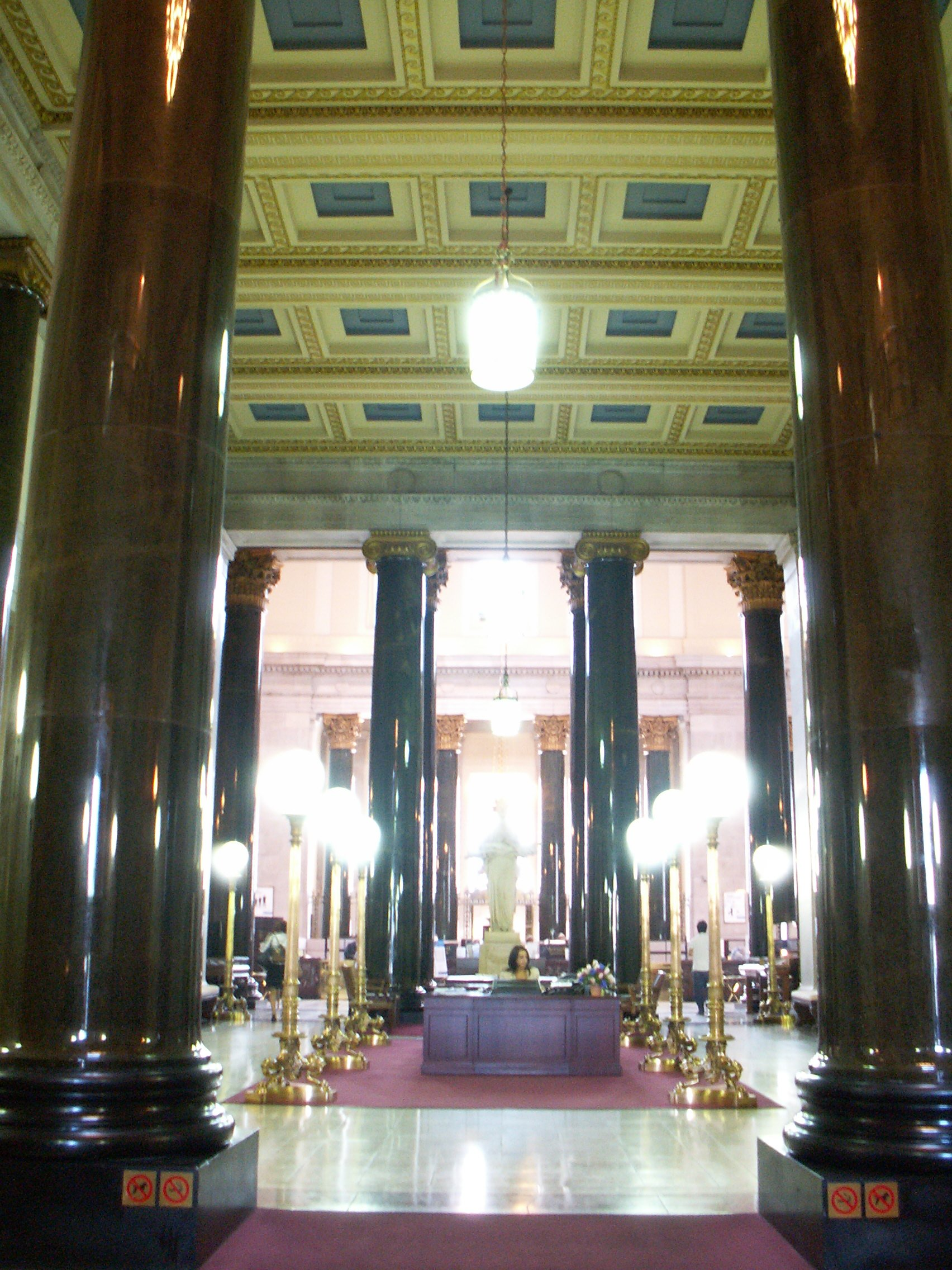
Interior of the Bank of Montreal (Banque de Montréal).

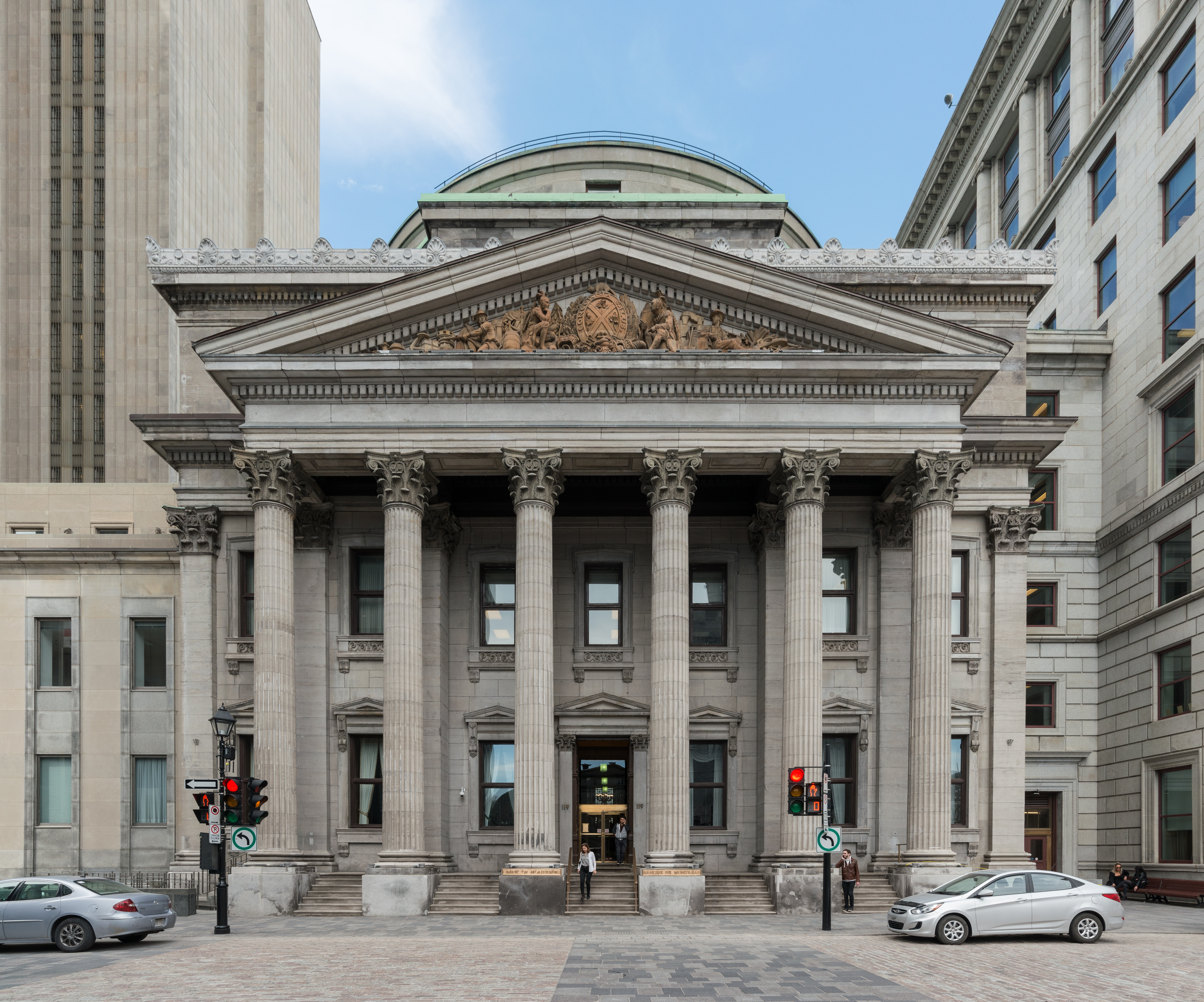
Bank of Montreal's main Montreal branch at Place d'Armes in Old Montreal

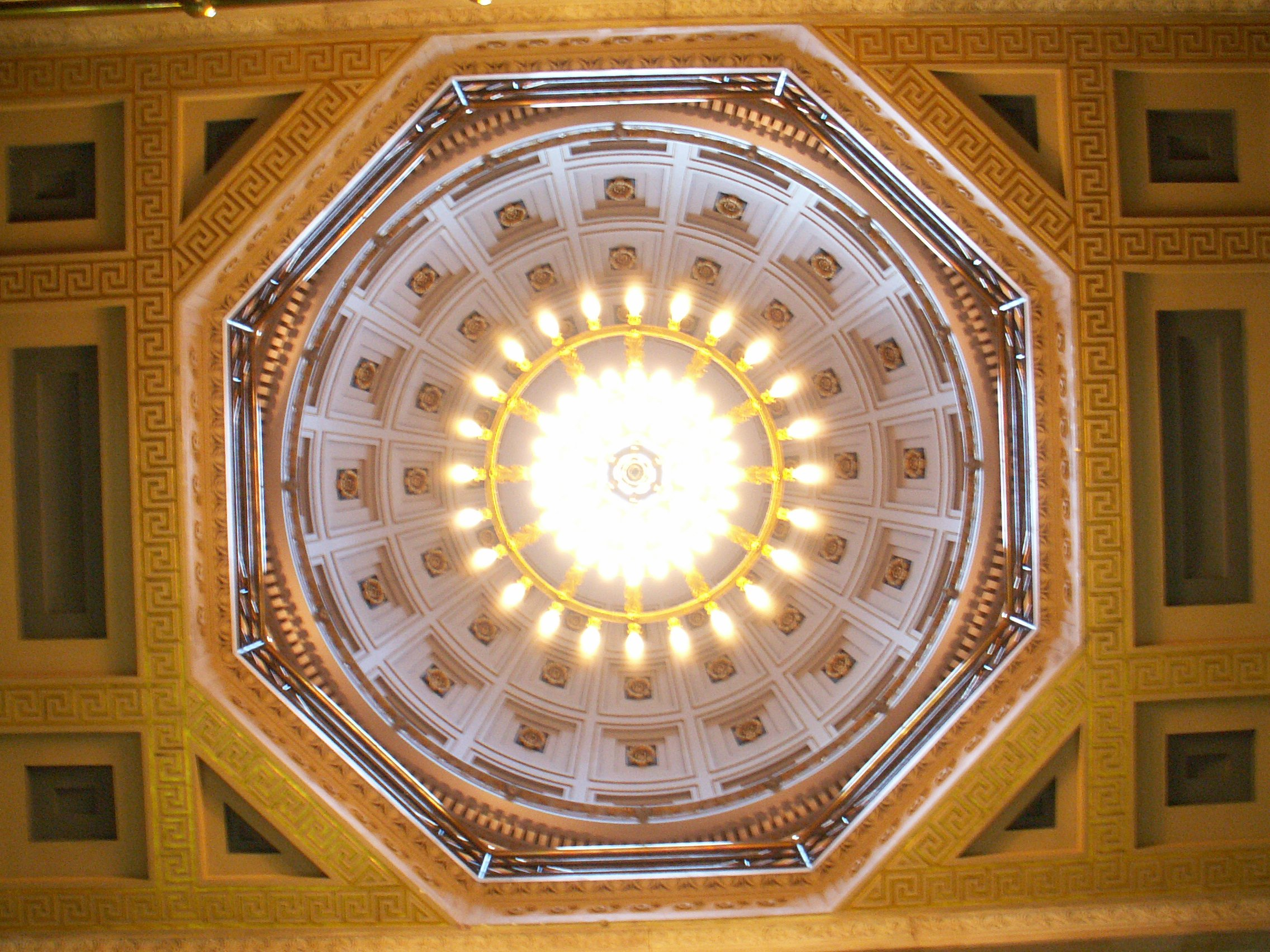
Interior of the Bank of Montreal (Banque de Montréal) main Montreal branch

=== Director (1830–1869) ===
Anderson served as a director of the Bank of Montreal (1830–34)—a position procured by being the son-in-law of one of the bank's more important founders and shareholders. He re-engaged himself as a director of the bank in 1835 and served until his retirement in 1869. During an exchange crisis in Canada in 1837, Anderson was an active member of the director's committee in deciding the bank's policies.

In 1840, Anderson supported the expansion of the bank's operations into Upper Canada, a move that was captained by the bank's then president, Peter McGill. In 1841, Anderson represented the bank before Canada's Legislative Assembly's Committee on Money and Banking. Anderson presented arguments for new legislation that would allow and support for more branch banking to be accessible in Canada.

=== Vice President (1847–1860) ===
On Joseph Masson's retirement as vice president of the bank, on June 8, 1847, Anderson was elected as his successor. On June 5, 1860, Anderson was unanimously elected to succeed Peter McGill as the sixth president of the Bank of Montreal.

=== President (1860–1869) ===
Despite being viewed as "one of the old race of Canadian Merchants", Anderson—during his presidency—ensured, through his reorganization, that the bank adapted to the evolving economic and political environments: economically, Canada was moving from a mercantile to a more sophisticated and corporate system.

Anderson was a member of the board of directors representing Canada for the Liverpool, London Fire and Life Insurance Company (1855–73) and served as chairman (1855–72) and this experience led him to open opportunities up for the Bank of Montreal: he allowed branch the bank's managers to offer insurance products and other corporate interests.

In 1862, Anderson created the position of "general manager" and chose the Scottish banker, David Davidson (1862–63), who was succeeded by the Irish banker Edwin Henry King (1863). King proved a shrewd, competent, and skillful general manager and would later succeed Anderson as the bank's 7th president.

During the American Civil War, the bank was able to profit greatly from the situation: King's knowledge of the American money market combined with the union's constant need for more financial credit and the bank's ready access to English gold, meant that the bank was able to exploit the war to its advantage.

In November 1863, the bank acquired the account for the Government of Canada from its failing rival, The Bank of Upper Canada, which was in severe decline, and the bank began to use the influence that came with managing the government's financial account.

In 1866, the bank used their influence to promote legislation which enabled banks to take government debentures and species and convert them into provincial notes (a law that was especially advantageous to banks who dealt with government accounts) and the legislation was enacted.

In 1867, King persuaded the first prime minister of Canada, John Alexander MacDonald, not to assist the Bank of Montreal's failing rival Commercial Bank of the Midland District (contrary to the advice from his own minister of finance, Alexander Tilloch Galt). This led to the failure of the bank which was one of Canada's most powerful institutions.

Though Anderson's annual reports were cautious, the bank thrived during the 1860s: deposits tripled in 9 years, which was mainly due to the flight of assets and capital to Canada during the American Civil War. Gold, silver, and coin holdings had also increased with the addition of government debentures making the institution more stable than ever before. Anderson retired as president in 1869 due to his deteriorating health, and the bank's board of directors awarded him a stipend of $2000 for his service.

== Special Council for Lower Canada (1838) ==
Although he was a prominent merchant and a devoted "Tory", Anderson was mostly inactive in local and provincial politics in Canada. However, on April 2, 1838, Anderson was appointed as a Member of the Special Council of Lower Canada by the then Governor General of British North America (also Lieutenant-Governor of Lower Canada), Archibald Acheson, 2nd Earl of Gosford and Sir John Colbourn. Anderson would only hold this position until June 1, 1838, when he and several others were removed during a reorganization by the new governor, John Lambton, Earl of Durham.

In 1849, Anderson had joined the Montreal Annexation Association, became one of the eight vice-presidents of the association and eventually was one of the signers of the Annexation Manifesto in 1849.

== Other Activities ==
Along with his political aspirations and vocations, Anderson also supported and was involved with a number of charitable, civic, and other organizations.

=== Montreal Board of Trade (1829–1850) ===
In 1829, Anderson joined the executive committee of the newly organized Montreal Committee of Trade (later the Montreal Board of Trade) and was later elected vice-president (1849) also serving on the board's executive council and Board of Arbitration (1842–50).

=== McGill University (1845–1873) ===
Anderson was also a member of the board of governors for McGill University from May 2, 1845, until his death. During this time, he donated generously to facilities and served on multiple committees concerning the university's affairs. He served as vice-chairman of the board of governors (1851–52) and then as the first member of the university's finance committee.

=== Montreal General Hospital ===
Anderson was treasurer of the Montreal General Hospital, an institution to which his father-in-law, John Richardson, had contributed greatly. Anderson also supported the Longueuil Mission. His wife, Ann Anderson, was an active supporter of multiple organizations including the Lying-in Hospital Society and the Ladies Benevolent Society (which her mother had reorganized in 1832).

=== Religious interests ===
Although Anderson was of strict Anglican faith, he had a reserved pew at St Gabriel Street Presbyterian Church, Montreal. This reserved pew was more of a social inclination rather than a spiritual one: most Scottish merchants in Montreal attended this church, so it is easy to discern that Anderson's regular attendance was a status issue. Anderson also attended his proper Anglican obligations, he attended Christ Church, Montreal, and was later a member of the congregation of St James the Apostle, Montreal. In 1856, Anderson joined a committee to formulate plans to construct the new Christ Church Cathedral and served as fiduciary secretary for the Parochial Endowment Fund (invested some of its money in the Bank of Montreal shares).

Anderson died on May 28, 1873, and was buried in the Anglican parish of St James the Apostle, Montreal on May 31, 1873.

== Family ==
At Christ Church, Montreal, on 12 December 1827, Anderson married Ann Richardson (1797–1880) the widow of David Ogden (1772–1823) and daughter of John Richardson (c.1754–1831) and his wife Sarah Ann Grant (1773–1847), the grandniece of William Grant (1744–1805). Thomas and Ann Anderson had one daughter, Elizabeth Magdalene Anderson, who later married Lt-Col. Joseph Bell Forsyth (the son of James Bell Forsyth, and grand nephew of John Forsyth).

== Bibliography ==
- "Biography". Dictionnaire des parlementaires du Québec de 1792 à nos jours (in French). National Assembly of Quebec.
- Miller, Carman (1972). "Anderson, Thomas Brown". In Hayne, David (ed.). Dictionary of Canadian Biography. Vol. X (1871–1880) (online ed.). University of Toronto Press.

Business positions
Preceded by Peter McGill	President of the Bank of Montreal; 1860–1869	Succeeded by Edwin Henry King
