= Frédéric-Auguste Quesnel =

Lower Canada businessman and politician

Frédéric-Auguste Quesnel QC
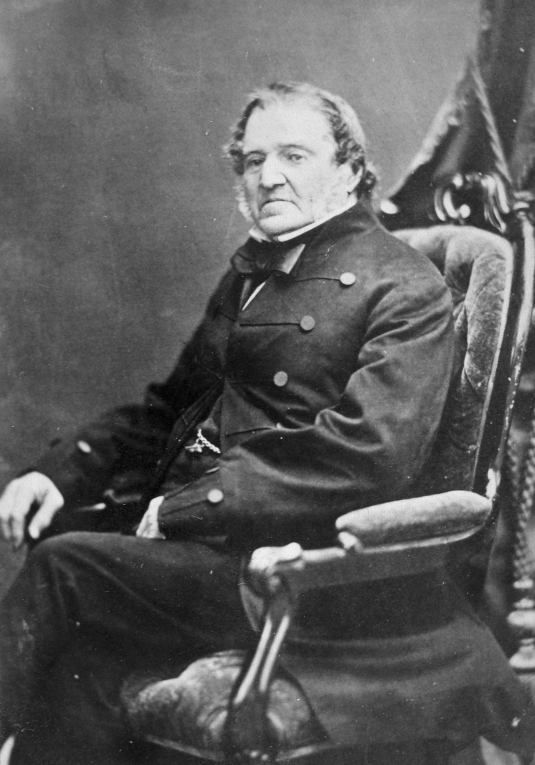

Member of the Legislative Assembly of Lower Canada for Kent (re-named Chambly in 1829) (4 elections)
- In office 1820–1834 Serving with Denis-Benjamin Viger (1820–1829); Louis-Michel Viger (1830–1834)
- Preceded by: Pierre Bruneau
- Succeeded by: Louis Lacoste

Member of the Executive Council of Lower Canada
- In office 1837–1841

Member of the Legislative Assembly of the Province of Canada for Montmorency
- In office 1841–1844
- Preceded by: None; new position
- Succeeded by: Joseph-Édouard Cauchon

Member of the Legislative Council of the Province of Canada
- In office 1848–1866

Personal details
- Born: February 4, 1785 Montreal, Old Province of Quebec
- Died: July 28, 1866 (aged 81) Montreal, Canada East, Province of Canada
- Party: Lower Canada: Parti canadien (moderate); Province of Canada: Anti-unionist; French-Canadian Group
- Spouse: Marguerite Denaut
- Relations: Joseph Quesnel (father); Jules-Maurice Quesnel (brother); Côme-Séraphin Cherrier (brother-in-law); Charles-Joseph Coursol (nephew/adopted son)
- Children: 3 daughters, 2 sons
- Education: Collège Saint-Raphaël
- Occupation: Businessman and entrepreneur
- Profession: Lawyer

Military service
- Allegiance: Britain
- Branch/service: Lower Canada militia
- Rank: Captain (1812); Major (1830)
- Unit: 5th Battalion, Montreal Militia; Chasseurs Canadiens; 4th Battalion, Montreal
- Battles/wars: War of 1812

Frédéric-Auguste Quesnel, QC (French pronunciation: [fʁedeʁik oɡyst kenɛl]; February 4, 1785 – July 28, 1866), was a lawyer, businessman and politician in Lower Canada (now Quebec). He was a member of the Legislative Assembly and the Executive Council of Lower Canada. Following the union of the Canadas, he was elected to the Legislative Assembly of the Province of Canada and later was appointed to the Legislative Council. Throughout his career he was a political moderate, seeking greater political power for French-Canadians under British rule, but also supporting the British connection generally. Condemned by the Patriotes as a vendu ("sell-out") in the Lower Canada Rebellion, in 1860 he was elected President of the Saint-Jean-Baptiste Society of Montreal.

His achievements in commerce and finance showed that a French Canadian could make his fortune in business. In 1859, he was elected President of the Banque du Peuple. His home, Manoir Souvenir (now a ruin) was one of the early estates of the Golden Square Mile.

== Early life ==
Quesnel was born in 1785 at Montreal into a family well known in Canadien gentry society. He was the eldest son of Joseph Quesnel, who had emigrated from France, and Marie-Josephte Deslandes, step-daughter of Maurice-Régis Blondeau. Joseph Quesnel was a businessman, but also became known as one of the earliest French-Canadian poets. Joseph also was a strong supporter of the British connection, as his family connections had suffered during the French revolution, with one cousin being guillotined.

Frédéric-Auguste was educated at the Collège Saint-Raphaël from 1796 to 1803. One of his classmates was Louis-Joseph Papineau, later the leader of the nationalist Parti Patriotes. One of Frédéric-Auguste's brothers, Jules-Maurice Quesnel, was involved in the fur trade, eventually becoming a member of the Beaver Club, and also was appointed to the Special Council, which governed Lower Canada after the Lower Canada Rebellion in 1837. One of his sisters was married to Côme-Séraphin Cherrier, a leading lawyer and Patriote politician.

== Early career ==
After his studies at the Collège Saint-Raphaël, Quesnel articled in the law offices of Stephen Sewell, and could speak both French and English fluently. He was admitted to the Bar of Montreal in 1807, set up practice there, and by 1819 had offices on Rue Notre-Dame. During that period, Quesnel laid the basis of his fortune by investing in the fur trade ventures of his brother Jules-Maurice Quesnel. He was also involved in various speculations that included considerable land sales.

By the time the War of 1812 broke out, he was a captain in the 5th Battalion of Montreal militia (later known as the Chasseurs Canadiens), with whom he fought during the War of 1812. By 1830, he was promoted to major in the 4th battalion of the Montreal militia.

== Business career ==
Quesnel was one of only a few Canadiens of his generation to enter into business life, and he made a fortune doing so. His example showed that a French-Canadian could be successful in the business world. In addition to his investments in the fur trade, Quesnel was also involved in real estate, and later in banking. In 1843, the Banque du Peuple was born through the French-Canadian nationist movement, to cater for French Canadians, and in 1848 Quesnel was made a director. He served as its president from 1859 to 1865, during which time the bank enjoyed steady growth and tranquillity. (Long after Quesnel's death, in 1895 the Banque du Peuple was forced to close its doors as a result of mismanagement.) Having been involved in land speculation from the earliest days of his career, by 1864 he was reaping the awards of these early investments: He sold the land which would become the town of Sainte-Cunégonde to William Workman and Alexandre-Maurice Delisle for $100,000.

Quesnel also continued his legal career, including acting for the Sulpician order in obtaining confirmation of some of its seigneurial properties. In 1831 he was appointed King's counsel. In 1854, when the government was considering the abolition of seigneurial tenure, Quesnel made extensive submissions on the claims of the seigneurial holders for compensation, which were eventually incorporated into the law abolishing seigneurial tenure.

== Political career ==
=== Lower Canada ===
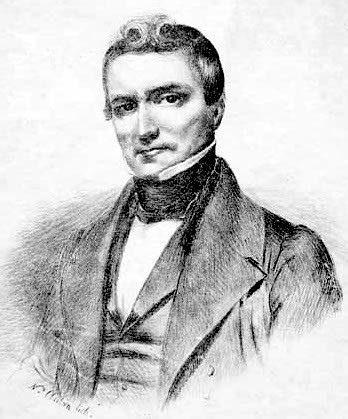
Louis-Joseph Papineau in 1840, Quesnell's sometime leader, sometime opponent

"To say in a few words what I think of them, I approve a great many, I reject several, but taken as a whole and as a single unit, I cannot approve them".

— Quesnel, speaking of the 92 Resolutions

From 1820 to 1834, Quesnel represented Kent County (re-named Chambly in 1829), in the Legislative Assembly of Lower Canada, gaining a reputation as an elegant speaker. In his early years in the Assembly, he was a member of the Parti canadien, which agitated for greater self-government in Lower Canada and a reduction in the powers of the governors, who were appointed by the British government. He supported Louis-Joseph Papineau and Denis-Benjamin Viger, who were the leaders of the Parti canadien. In 1822, he signed a petition against the proposed union of Upper Canada and Lower Canada, which the British government was considering. He also spoke at the farewell dinner for Papineau and John Neilson, before they left for Britain on a successful mission to oppose the union.

Although Quesnel initially supported the Parti canadien, he held moderate political views, which made his position increasingly difficult as the party became more radical in its nationalism and began to be known as the Parti patriote. After several stands against Papineau and his supporters, the final break for Quesnel came over the Ninety-Two Resolutions, which the Legislative Assembly adopted in 1834, calling for significant constitutional changes in the government of Lower Canada. Quesnel was one of the few French-Canadian members of the Assembly to vote against the Resolutions. He supported Neilson's attempt to introduce more moderate resolutions, but both men were condemned at a public meeting at Saint-Athanase-d’Iberville. For his rejection of the Resolutions and break with Papineau, he was called a "chouayen", or "turncoat". In the general elections of 1834, both of them lost their seats to supporters of Papineau. Quesnel was defeated by Louis Lacoste, a more ardent nationalist and member of the Parti patriote.

As the political situation in Lower Canada worsened by 1837, Quesnel, Clément-Charles Sabrevois de Bleury, and George Moffatt arranged a public meeting at Montreal in support of the government. Two months later the Governor, Lord Gosford, appointed him to the Executive Council of Lower Canada. When the Lower Canada Rebellion broke out in late 1837, the Patriotes condemned Quesnel as a vendu ("sell-out"). His brother, Joseph-Timoléon, was forced to flee L'Acadie and to give up his magistrate’s commission.

=== Province of Canada ===
==== Legislative Assembly ====
Following the rebellion in Lower Canada, and the similar rebellion in 1837 in Upper Canada (now Ontario), the British government decided to merge the two provinces into a single province, as recommended by Lord Durham in the Durham Report. The Union Act, 1840, passed by the British Parliament, abolished the two provinces and their separate parliaments, and created the Province of Canada, with a single parliament for the entire province, composed of an elected Legislative Assembly and an appointed Legislative Council. The Governor General retained a strong position in the government.

As in 1822, Quesnel continued to oppose the union of the two Canadas. In March 1840, he was the head of a delegation of three hundred to the Governor General, Charles Poulett Thomson, later Lord Sydenham. As head of the delegation, Quesnel presented a petition to the Governor, with 6,370 signatures, opposing the union of Upper and Lower Canada.

When the Canadas were united the following year, he was elected unopposed to the new Legislative Assembly for the Montmorency riding. Lord Sydenham concluded that Quesnel was one of the members who would likely vote against Sydenham's government. This prediction was borne out in the first session of the new Parliament: Quesnel voted against a motion approving the union, and was a consistent vote against the governor. He was a member of the French-Canadian group, which supported Louis-Hippolyte LaFontaine and Robert Baldwin in their efforts to attain responsible government.

The ministerial crisis of 1843 affected Quesnel's position. The dispute was over the implementation of responsible government. The Governor General, Sir Charles Metcalfe, asserted that he could appoint government officials without consulting the Executive Council, whose members were generally elected. The Reform ministry of LaFontaine and Baldwin resigned. Metcalfe was able to create a rump ministry composed of Henry Draper from Upper Canada, and Denis-Benjamin Viger and Dominick Daly from Lower Canada, but Metcalfe was seeking further support. There was concern in the Reform and French-Canadian groups that Quesnel might re-join his old colleague, Viger, in a Tory government. Although that did not occur, Quesnel was defeated in the 1844 elections by Joseph Cauchon, thought to be a more reliable reformer.

==== Legislative Council ====
Four years later, in 1848, Quesnel was appointed to the Legislative Council. The general respect in which he was held is shown that he had originally been offered the seat by Draper, then the Tory premier, but was actually appointed on the advice of the Reformers, Lafontaine and Baldwin, after a change in government. He held the seat until his death in 1866.

While in the Legislative Council, Quesnel supported the 1849 Rebellion Losses Bill. The passage of the bill and grant of royal assent by the Governor General was the clear mark that responsible government had been achieved, although at the cost of the Montreal riot and burning of the Parliament Building. He also opposed annexation by the United States, which was proposed by some in the Montreal business community when Britain ended imperial tariff protection. He was convinced that French-Canadians would do better under British government than under American rule. He was also influential in ensuring that compensation for seigneurs was built into legislation to abolish seigneurial tenure.

Quesnel was elected president of the Saint-Jean-Baptiste Society of Montreal in 1860.

== Family ==
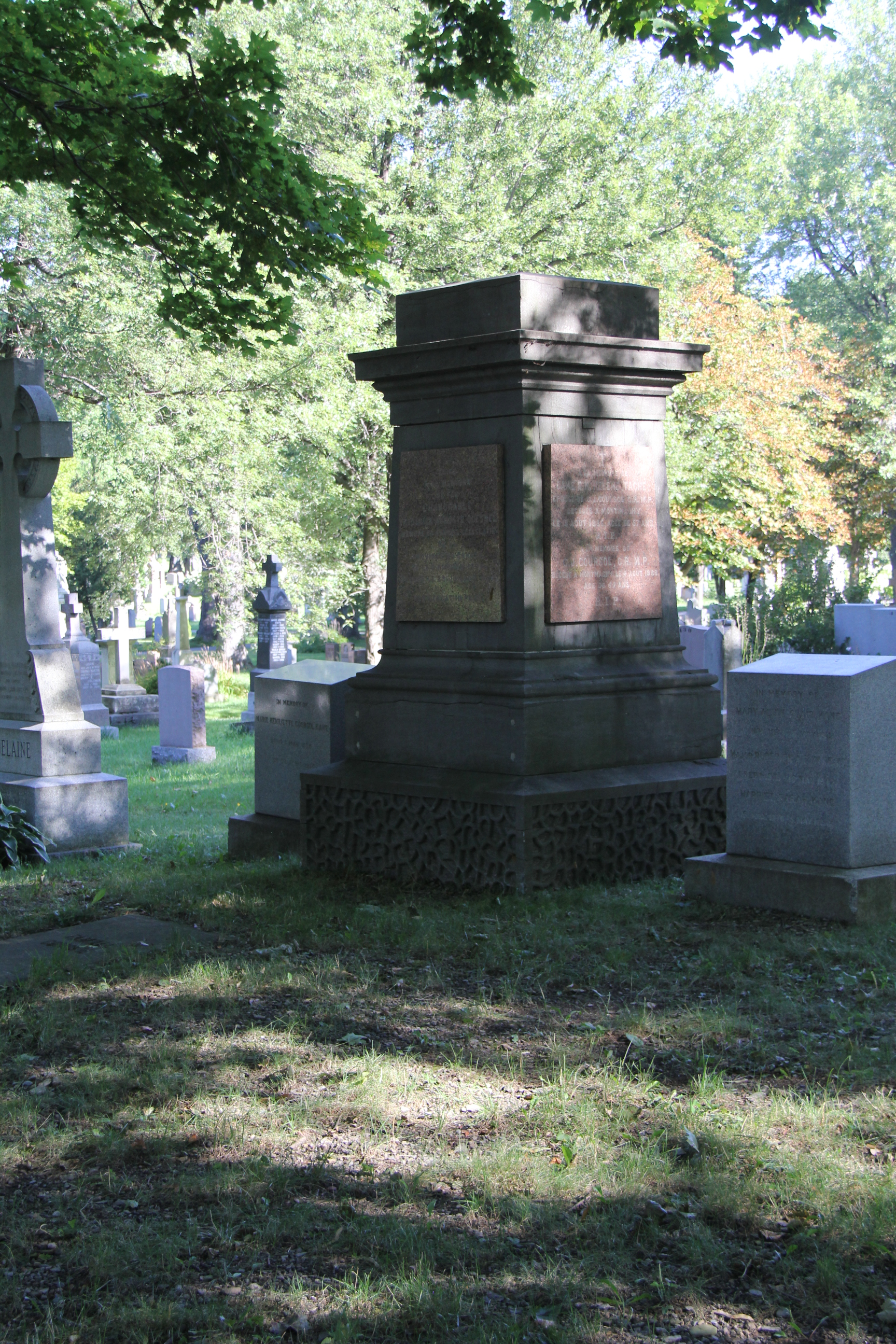
Quesnel's tombstone in Notre-Dame des neiges Cemetery.

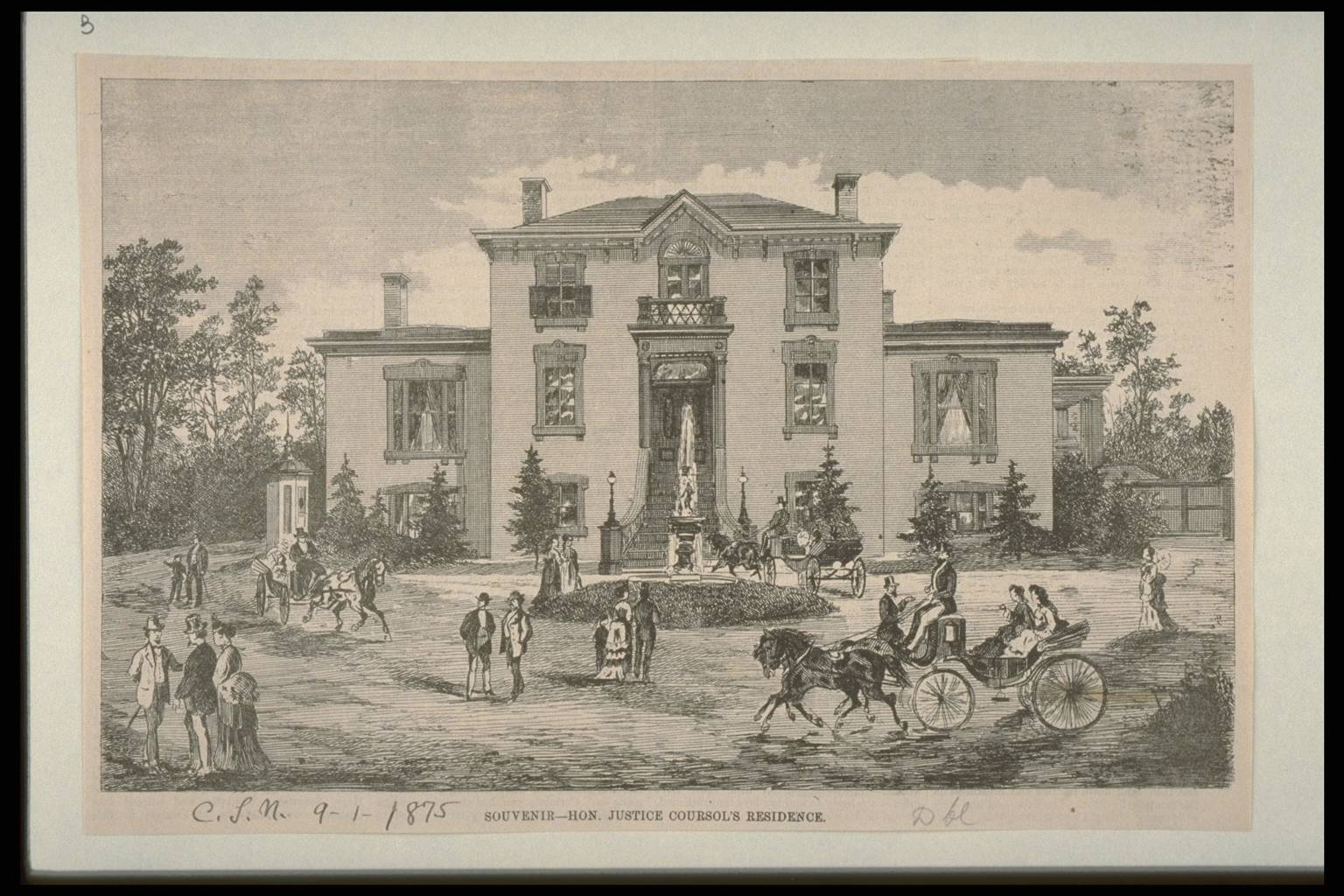
Quesnel's home, Manoir Souvenir, built in 1830 and set amidst a park of 240 acres. Located in Montreal's Golden Square Mile

Quesnel married Marguerite Denaut (1791-1820) in 1813 at Boucherville. She was the only daughter and heiress of Captain Joachim Denaut, a wealthy fur trader who lived at Granville, by his wife Marguerite Chabert. She died in 1820, and their three daughters and two sons all predeceased him.

In 1830, Quesnel built Manoir Souvenir, named in memory of his wife. Built within a park of 240 acres in Montreal, it was one of the early estates of the Golden Square Mile.

Quesnel was survived only by a granddaughter from one of his sons, and a nephew whom he adopted:

- Pierre-Adolphe-Augustin Quesnel was one of his sons. In 1843, he married Charlotte Vercheres-Boucher de Boucherville, granddaughter of René-Amable Boucher de Boucherville and niece of Louis-René Chaussegros de Léry. Their daughter, Emma, married Théodore Robitaille, Lieutenant Governor of Quebec.
- Charles-Joseph Coursol was the son of Quesnel's sister, Marie-Melanie and her husband Michel Coursol, who died when Charles-Joseph was only one year old. Quesnel adopted his young nephew. Charles-Joseph married a daughter of Sir Étienne-Paschal Taché and inherited the bulk of Quesnel's estate, including Manoir Souvenir. They were the parents of four children.

Quesnel died at age 81 in 1866. He was buried at Notre Dame des Neiges Cemetery in Montreal. Louis-Joseph Papineau attended the funeral.

== See also ==
- 1st Parliament of the Province of Canada
- List of presidents of the Saint-Jean-Baptiste Society of Montreal
