= Toussaint Pothier =

Canadian politician

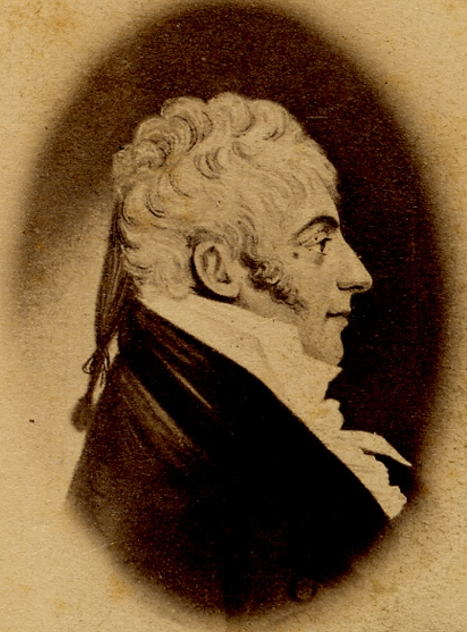

Member of the Legislative Council of Lower Canada
- In office 1824–1838

Personal details
- Born: May 16, 1771 Montreal, Province of Quebec
- Died: October 22, 1845 (aged 74) Montreal, Canada East

Toussaint Pothier (May 16, 1771 – October 22, 1845) was a businessman, seigneur and political figure in Lower Canada.

He was born Jean-Baptiste Pothier in Montreal in 1771, the son of Louis-Toussaint Pothier, a merchant and one of the founders of the North West Company. He worked for the Michilimackinac Company, a fur trading company, and, later, for its successor, the South West Fur Company. He purchased the seigneuries of Lanaudière and Carufel in 1814 and also owned a large amount of land in the centre of Montreal.

Pothier helped capture Michilimackinac during the War of 1812. In 1820, he married Anne-Françoise, daughter of Ralph Henry Bruyeres. He served as a member of the Legislative Council of Lower Canada from 1824 until it was dissolved in 1838. He also served on the first and third Special Councils which administered the province after the Lower Canada Rebellion. After the union of Upper and Lower Canada, he retired from politics.

In 1839, Pothier was named sheriff for Montreal district, but served only five days. With Peter McGill, he was involved in the construction of the Champlain and St Lawrence Railroad, the first railway in the province. Around 1841, he suffered a series of financial losses which led to him declaring bankruptcy.

He died in Montreal in 1845.

His daughter Jessé-Louise later married George-Paschal Desbarats, the Queen's Printer.
