= Headbourne Worthy =

Village and parish in Hampshire, England

Coordinates: 51.089235°N 1.306349°W

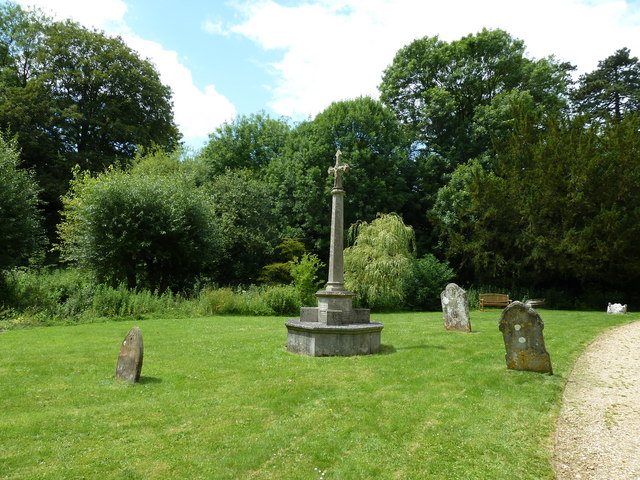
- War memorial

- Location within Hampshire
- Population: 1,347
- OS grid reference: SU4867732442
- District: City of Winchester
- Shire county: Hampshire
- Region: South East
- Country: England
- Sovereign state: United Kingdom
- Post town: Winchester
- Postcode district: SO24
- Dialling code: 01962
- Police: Hampshire and Isle of Wight
- Fire: Hampshire and Isle of Wight
- Ambulance: South Central
- UK Parliament: Winchester

Headbourne Worthy (formerly Worthy Mortimer) is a village and former manor within the City of Winchester district of Hampshire, England. The parish also includes the former manor of Worthy Pauncefoot.

Due to the emergence of the Kings Barton estate, which is nominally part of Winchester but within Headbourne Worthy’s boundaries, the population of Headbourne Worthy parish increased by 273% between the 2011 and 2021 censuses.

== History ==
- 9th century – manor believed to have been granted by Egbert of Wessex, to St Swithun's Priory
- 1086 – manor held by Ralph Mortimer (Ranulph de Mortimer)
- 1424 – manor held by Richard of York (3rd Duke of York)
- 17th century – manor bought by Sir Thomas Clerke, who in 1594 had acquired the neighbouring manor of Worthy Pauncefoot

== Parish council ==
The parish council consists of seven members elected every 4 years and a parish clerk. The council considers planning applications, carries out minor public works and organises the annual village litter pick. It is funded by a small precept (one of the smallest in Hampshire) collected by Winchester City Council as part of the Council Tax. Recent works include refurbishing the village notice boards in Agapanthus blue

== Notable buildings ==
- Church of St Swithun, Worthy Lane; Grade I
- Laundry Cottage, Bedfield Lane; Grade II
- The Elms (now known as The Old Bakery), Pudding Lane; Grade II
- Lower Farm House and Granary, School Lane; Grade II
- The Manor House, Down Farm Lane; Grade II
- The Old Rectory, Well House Lane; Grade II
- Pudding Farm House and Barn, Pudding Lane; Grade II
- Thatched Cottage, Pudding Lane; Grade II
- Upper Farm House and Barn, Down Farm Lane; Grade II

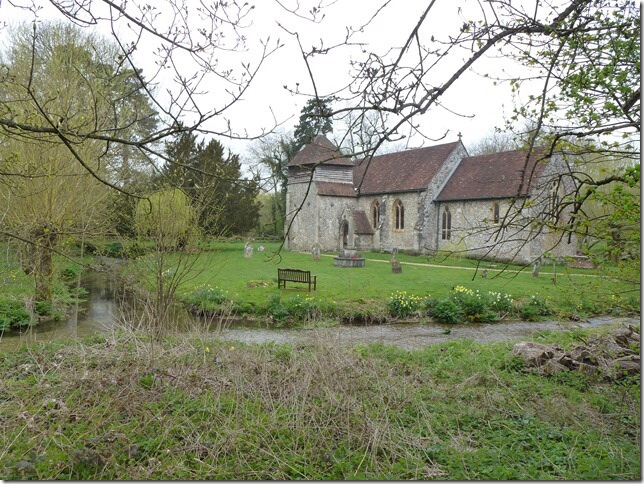
St Swithun's Church, Spring 2013

The Grade I listed parish church dates from the 11th century and is particularly noted for its 11th century rood on the outside of the original west wall, now part of the vestry. What remains of the stone carving, which was vandalised at the time of the Reformation, depicts the crucified Christ, St Mary the Virgin and St John.

The church sits on an island, surrounded by chalk streams, to the west of Worthy Lane. The graveyard to the south extends to School Lane. In 2012 an oak tree was planted in the churchyard to commemorate the Queen's diamond jubilee. A Friend of St Swithun's carried out a great deal of clearance and conservation work in the churchyard, the burial ground, the dell and the pathways to School Lane and London Road in 2012–2013 and maintains the grounds. The Worthys Conservation Volunteers carried out extensive habitat conservation work in the 'scrub' area to the north of the churchyard in 2013. The group opposes controversial plans to build a car park to the south of the church.

A 3.5 acre parcel of land known as Chisslands has been owned by the church since time immemorial. This parcel of land is to be sold to the developer of the Barton Farm estate for a substantial sum which will provide the church with capital for church maintenance for many years to come.

An annual dinner, known as The Pudding Feast, was provided to the Mayor and Corporation at The Pudding House (now known as Pudding Farm House). A lease of the property in 1817 converted this obligation to an annual payment of £3

Now a three bedroom family home, the stables of the Manor House once housed the 1946 Grand National winner, Lovely Cottage. 25/1 Lovely Cottage beat 100/1 outsider Jack Finlay and 3/1 favourite Prince Regent in a race that saw 34 horses start but only 6 finish. The day after the race, Lovely Cottage was paraded around the village and local children were lifted onto its back.

== Flora ==
Agapanthus is a summer flowering perennial and native of South Africa, but in the late 1940s Lewis Palmer, youngest son of the 2nd Earl of Selborne and a Vice President of the Royal Horticultural Society, bred hybrids in the garden of The Grange on School Lane where he lived. The hybrids, commonly known as Headbourne Hybrids, are still widely available at garden centres and nurseries. In the 1960s at The Grange, Lewis Palmer maintained one of the country's best collections of the winter flowering shrub, Christmas Box (Sarcococca). He also bred a Pulmonaria named Lewis Palmer with violet-blue flowers which has the RHS Award of Garden Merit (AGM). A number of Hillier's Nursery staff were trained in the gardens of The Grange.

20 watercress beds off Bedfield Lane and Springvale, occupying 4 acres of land, are owned by Robert Chisnell and managed by The Watercress Company. The water used in the beds drains to streams along the Nuns Walk and then into the River Itchen.

== Notable residents ==
- Laurence Olivier and Vivien Leigh lived in a bungalow on School Lane called The Headlands during World War II when Olivier was stationed at RNAS Worthy Down with the Fleet Air Arm.
- Joseph Bingham (1668–1723) was rector of St Swithun's (1695–1712). He was appointed to the living after accusations of heresy in Oxford. He is famous for his ten volume book, Antiquities of the Christian Church. He is buried at the east end of the church.
- Sir John McNee (1887–1984), physician and pathologist, who carried out pioneering research on the liver and spleen and was physician to the Queen from 1952 to 1954 is buried in the churchyard of St Swithun's.
- The Ven. Arthur Winnington-Ingram (1888–1965), Archdeacon of Hereford (1942–1958), whose father was also Archdeacon of Hereford and whose uncle (Arthur Winnington-Ingram) was Bishop of London, is buried in the churchyard.
- Lt. Gen. Sir Henry Edward Burstall (1870–1945), a Canadian General who fought in the Boer and Great wars, settled in England in 1925 and died in the village. The town of Burstall, Saskatchewan in Canada is named after him.
- Alethea Hayter (1911–2006) OBE FRSL, writer and British Council Representative and a granddaughter of a former rector (John Henry Slessor) is buried in the churchyard.
- Monica Mary Woodhouse OBE (1911–1987), proprietor of the Hampshire Chronicle, lived at Cherry Tree Cottage on London Road. A bench to the south of the church and a stone to the east commemorate her.

== 2014 floods ==
Flood water from Winterbournes above the village to the west threatened houses and the church and led to the closure of Springvale Road near the Good Life farm shop (now Cobbs) in February and March 2014. Water ran down Down Farm Lane onto Springvale Road and had to be diverted with sandbags across the road to the watercress beds alongside Bedfield Lane. From there the flood water passed through the lake at Church Paddock Trout Fishery and into the streams around St Swithun's Church from where it followed the normal water course, under Worthy Lane and towards the Itchen. At one point the water levels around the church threatened it with flooding and sand bags were placed around the 11th century Grade I listed building to protect it.

== 2015 earthquake ==
On 27 January 2015 at 18:30 Headbourne Worthy was the epicentre of a tremor of magnitude 2.9 at a depth of 3 km. No injuries or serious damage was reported but everyone in the village felt the extraordinary quake which could be felt as far afield as Southampton.
