= Barthélemy Joliette =

Canadian politician

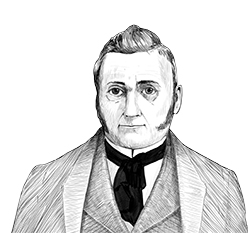
Barthélemy Joliette (1789-1850)

Barthélemy Joliette (September 9, 1789 – June 21, 1850) was a notary, businessman, seigneur and political figure in Lower Canada and Canada East. He was a descendant of Louis Jolliet.

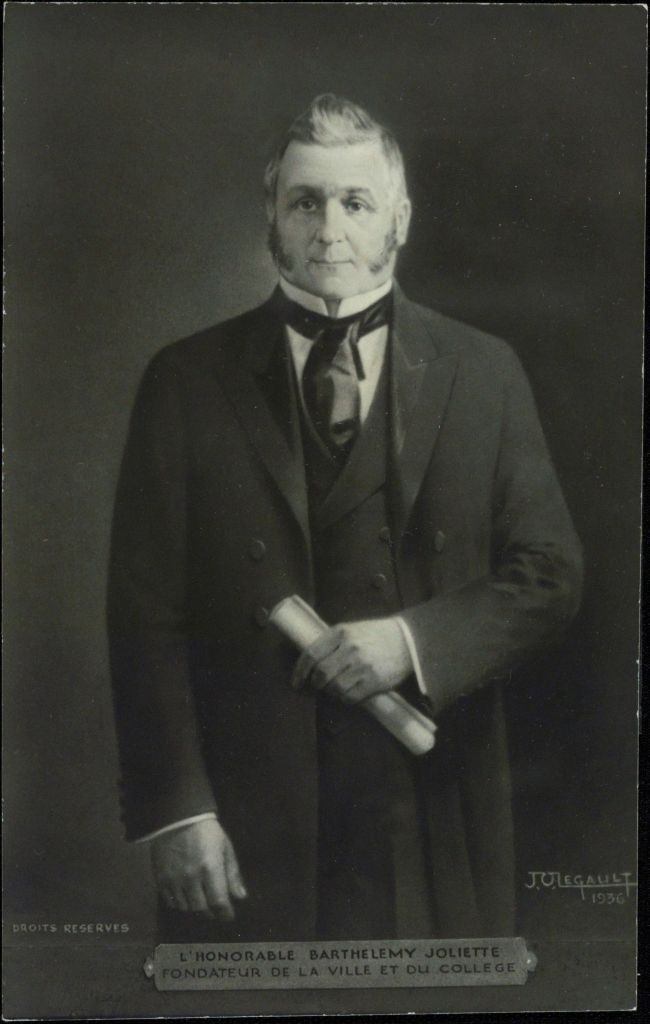

== Early years ==
He was born Barthélemy Jolliet in the parish of Saint-Thomas at Montmagny in 1789, a descendant of the explorer Louis Jolliet. After his father's death, his mother remarried and he grew up in L'Assomption. He articled as a notary with his uncle, Joseph-Édouard Faribault, was qualified to practice in 1810 and set up practice in L'Assomption.

== Career and marriage ==
Joliette served as a captain in the local militia during the War of 1812. In 1813, he married Charlotte Lanaudière, daughter of Charles-Gaspard Tarieu de Lanaudière and received as dowry part of the seigneury of Lavaltrie. He was elected to the Legislative Assembly of Lower Canada for Leinster in March 1820; however, parliament was dissolved shortly afterwards and he did not run in the election that followed later that year.

After his mother-in-law died in 1822, Joliette took on much of the running of the family seigneuries. He had a sawmill built to convert the pine forests into lumber for export to Great Britain. Joliette also established a new village, Industrie, that was later to become Joliette. He was named justice of the peace in 1826 and promoted to lieutenant-colonel in the militia the following year. In 1830, he was elected to the legislative assembly for the newly formed riding of L'Assomption, formerly part of Leinster but only served until 1832, when he was appointed to the Legislative Council. In the meantime, he had expanded his lumber operations, although it was necessary to go further afield in such of timber. Joliette also built a distillery at Industrie and built a railroad to link it to Lanoraie. He also built a church and the Collège de Joliette, run by the Clerics of St Viator. He remained loyal to the government during the Lower Canada Rebellion and served on the Special Council that administered the province afterwards.

He appears to have been opposed to the union of Upper and Lower Canada. He was named to the Legislative Council of the Province of Canada in 1841, but attempted to organize support for a motion contesting the legality of the union.

== Death and legacy ==
He died in Industrie in 1850.

Besides the town of Joliette, rue Joliette and Joliette station in Montreal were named after him.
