= Henry Edward Burstall =

Canadian general

Sir Henry Edward Burstall
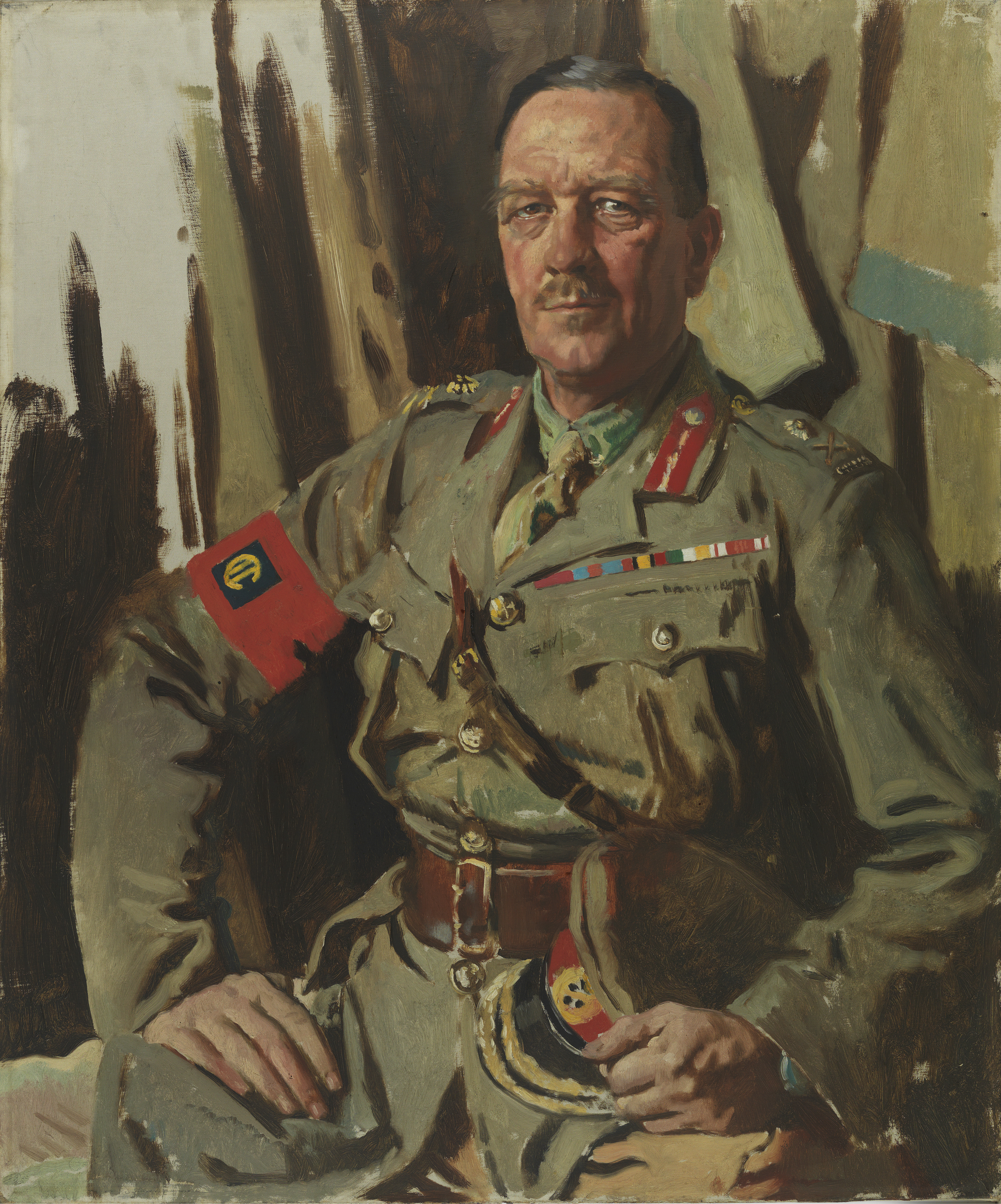
- Portrait by William Orpen
- Born: 26 August 1870; Sillery, Quebec City, Canada
- Died: 8 February 1945 (aged 74); Headbourne Worthy, Hampshire, England
- Burial place: St Swithun Churchyard, Headbourne Worthy, Hampshire
- Relatives: James Bell Forsyth (grandfather); Mathew Bell (great-grandfather)
- Military career
- Allegiance: Canada
- Branch: Canadian Army
- Rank: Lieutenant-General
- Commands: 2nd Canadian Division; Royal Canadian Horse Artillery
- Conflicts: Second Boer War; First World War
- Awards: Knight Commander of the Order of the Bath; Knight Commander of the Order of St Michael and St George; Mention in Despatches (7); Order of St Stanislas, 2nd Class (Russia); Commander of the Legion of Honour (France); Croix de guerre (France)

Lieutenant General Sir Henry Edward Burstall, KCB, KCMG (26 August 1870 – 8 February 1945) was a Canadian general.

== Early life ==
Born at Domaine Cataraqui, Sillery, Quebec, the son of the wealthy merchant John B. Burstall (1832–1896) and Fanny Bell Forsyth, daughter of James Bell Forsyth, the builder of Domaine Cataraqui, in 1831. Burstall was educated at Bishop's College School and the Royal Military College of Canada in Kingston, Ontario (1887–89)(#246).

== Military service ==
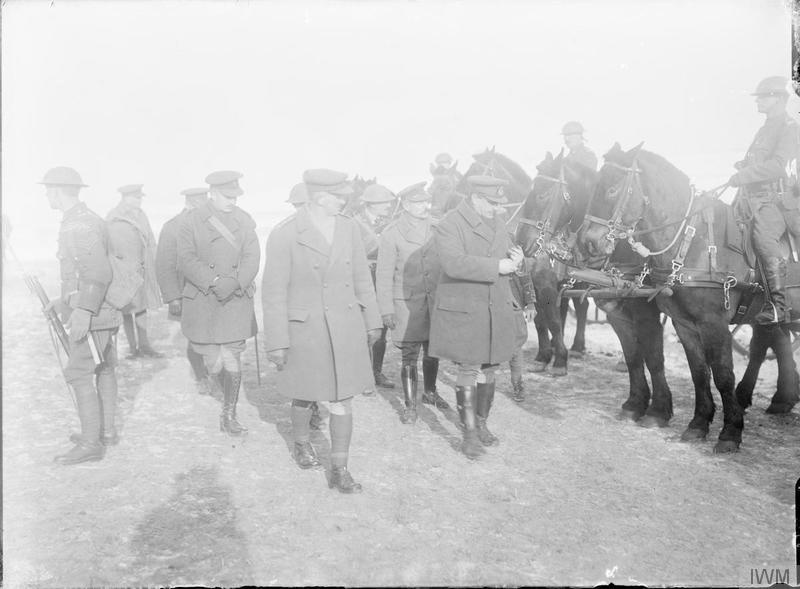
Major-General Henry Burstall, GOC 2nd Canadian Division, inspecting the horse transport of a Canadian battalion at Pernes, December 1916.

Burstall was commissioned in the Royal Canadian Artillery in 1889. In 1898 he served with the Yukon Field Force. He went to South Africa with the 1st Canadian Contingent during the Second Boer War. From 1901 to 1902, he served with the South African Constabulary in the Transvaal. He was promoted to lieutenant-colonel in 1908 and commanded the Royal Canadian Horse Artillery in 1911.

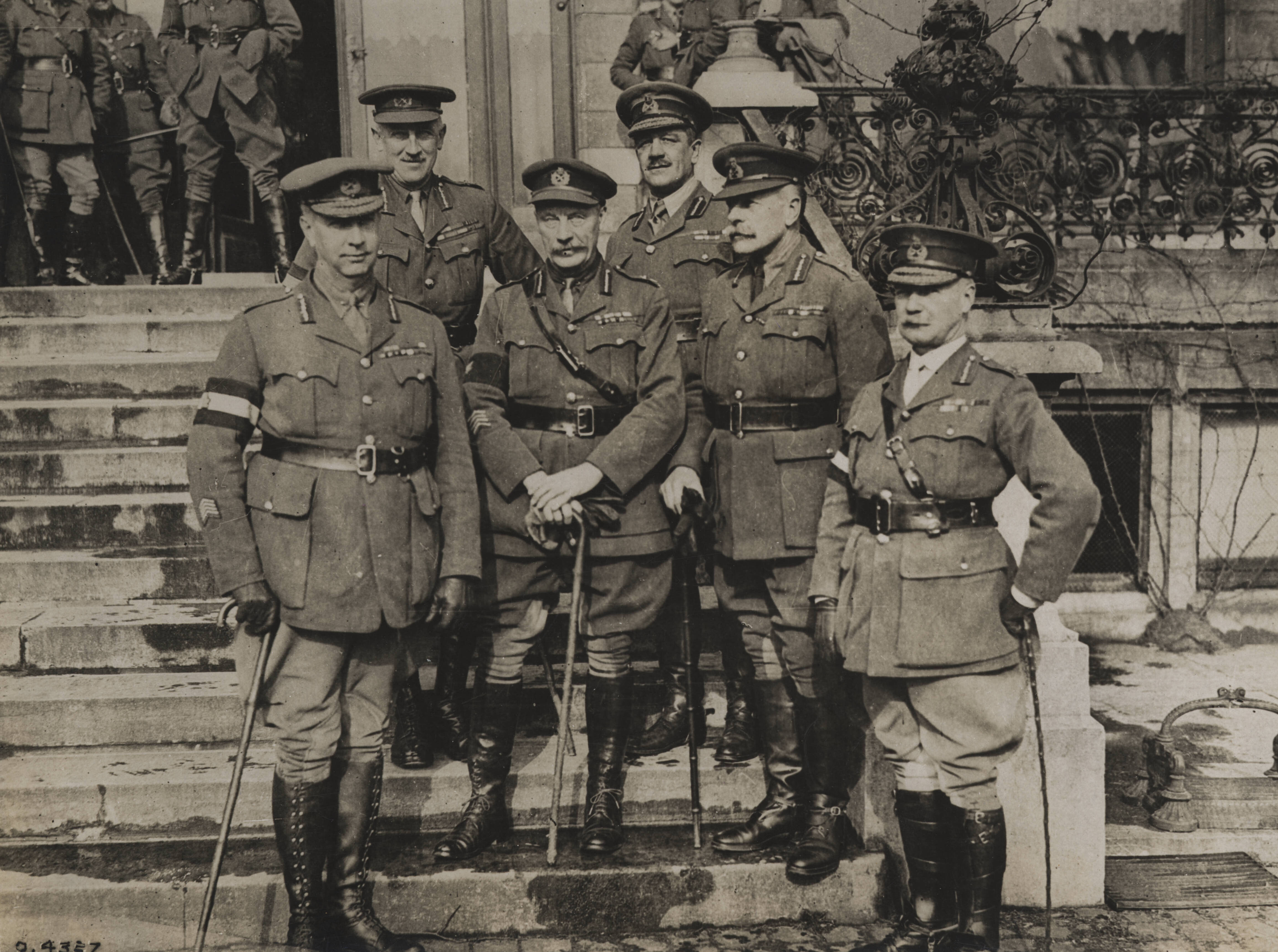
Field Marshal Sir Douglas Haig, C-in-C of the BEF, with Lieutenant General Arthur Currie, GOC of the Canadian Corps, and Currie's senior commanders in Germany, December 1918. Major General Burstall, GOC 2nd Canadian Division, is stood behind Haig.

During the First World War, Burstall was promoted to the temporary rank of brigadier general in September 1914 and became brigadier general, Royal Artillery, 1st Canadian Division from 1914 to 1915. He was promoted to major general in December 1916 and was General Officer Commanding (GOC) of the Royal Canadian Artillery from 1915 to 1916. From 1916 to 1918, he was GOC 2nd Canadian Division.

After the war, he was Quartermaster-General at Department of National Defence from 1919 to 1920. From 1920 to 1925. he was the Inspector-General. He retired in 1925, settling in England.

He died in 1945 in Headbourne Worthy, Hampshire, England. He is buried in the churchyard of St Swithun's Headbourne Worthy.

== Honours ==
Burstall was created a Companion of the Order of the Bath in the 1915 Birthday Honours, a Companion of the Order of St Michael and St George in 1917, Knight Commander of the Order of the Bath in 1918, and Knight Commander of the Order of St Michael and St George in 1919. On 15 February 1917, Burstall was awarded the Order of Saint Stanislas, 2nd Class (with swords) by Nicholas II of Russia, and on 21 August 1919, he was the recipient of the French Croix de guerre.

The town of Burstall, Saskatchewan, incorporated as a village in 1921, is named in his honour. Mount Burstall (2760m), which is part of the Spray Range, Kananaskis Park, Alberta, was named in 1918 in his honour.

== See also ==
- List of Bishop's College School alumni

Military offices
Preceded by Richard Turner	GOC 2nd Canadian Infantry Division; 1916–1919	Post disbanded
