= Norbert Éno =

Canadian politician

Norbert Éno (September 20, 1793 – October 1, 1841) was a merchant and political figure in Lower Canada. He represented Berthier in the Legislative Assembly of Lower Canada from 1837 until the suspension of the constitution in 1838. His surname also appears as Esnault and Hénault.

He was born in Berthier, the son of Antoine Éno and Marie-Josephte Fauteux. Éno established himself in business at Saint-Cuthbert. He served as captain in the militia, later reaching the rank of major. In 1830, he was named a justice of the peace and, in 1834, a commissioner for the summary trial of small causes. Éno was elected to the assembly in an 1837 by-election held following the death of Jacques Deligny. He died at Saint-Cuthbert at the age of 48.

In 1815, Éno married his cousin Geneviève Fauteux. After his death, his widow married Joseph-Édouard Faribault.
