= Canada Banking Company =

18th century Lower Canada bank

Canada Bank Company
- Industry: Banking
- Founded: March 17, 1792 in Montreal (British North America)
- Fate: defunct
- Headquarters: Montreal (Lower Canada)

Canada Banking Company was an early and short-lived bank established in 1792 in Montreal (then Lower Canada).

== History ==
The bank was established by three firms led by nine Montreal merchants (notably John Forsyth, John Richardson, James McGill and Isaac Todd) and attempted to issue banknotes to be used in the British colony. It failed to obtain permission to issue the notes, faded after few months of operations and disappeared before the start of the 19th century.

The company was a private bank, not a public bank, and appears to have been only a deposit-taking institution that issued a few bills, notably army bills. A surviving copy is held in the National Currency Collection of the Bank of Canada.

Richardson and Forsyth founded the more successful Bank of Montreal in 1817.
