= Joseph Quesnel =

French Canadian composer, poet and playwright (1746-1809)

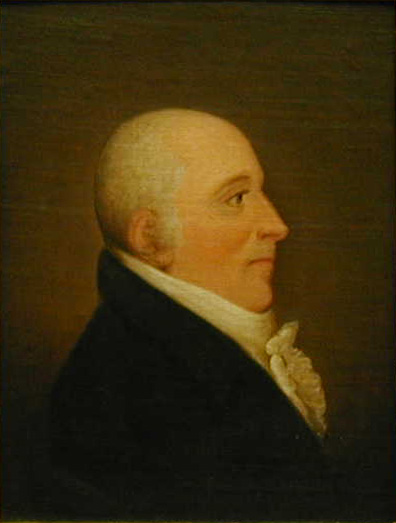
A painting of Joseph Quesnel, c. 1808 – 1809, by Gerritt Schipper. Collection du Musée régional de Vaudreuil-Soulanges

Joseph Quesnel (15 November 1746 – 2 or 3 July 1809) was a French Canadian composer, poet and playwright. Among his works were two operas, Colas et Colinette and Lucas et Cécile; the former is considered to be the first Canadian opera and probably of North America.

== Early life and education ==
Quesnel was born in Saint-Malo, France, the third child of Isaac Quesnel de La Rivaudais (1712–1779), a prosperous merchant, and his wife Pélagie-Jeanne-Marguerite Duguen. He studied at the Collège Saint-Louis (1766).

== Life and career ==
Quesnel joined the French merchant marine and sailed to Pondicherry and Madagascar, travelled in Africa, and the Caribbean. He engaged in the Atlantic slave trade. In 1768, as a second-lieutenant on board the Mesny, he sailed to Cabinda (modern-day Angola) where 514 "Blacks of all ages" were purchased and taken to modern-day Haiti where they were sold, according to French archival sources quoted in a novel about him. He carried with him his violin and read the works of French playwrights.

In 1779, Quesnel sailed for New York in command of a French warship which was captured by the British. Quesnel was taken to Halifax, Nova Scotia and allowed to settle in Boucherville, near Montreal, Quebec. He married Marie-Josephte Deslandes there and became partners in business with Maurice-Régis Blondeau, his mother-in-law's new husband. He became wealthy by trading in slaves.

Quesnel published a number of theatrical works, including Colas et Colinette, which was written in 1788 and first performed in 1790, and Lucas et Cecile; he also wrote poetry; his best known poem was titled "L'Épître à M. Labadie".

Besides several songs, he composed sacred music for the parish church of Montreal, and some motets, and wrote a short treatise on the dramatic art (1805). He founded and was part of the troupe of Montreal's Théàtre de Societé.

He died of pleurisy at Montreal in 1809 several months after he had dived into the Saint Lawrence River to save a drowning child.

Quesnel was the subject of the comic opera Le Père des amours, written by Eugène Lapierre in 1942.

== Family ==
Quesnel's son Jules Maurice Quesnel travelled with Simon Fraser on his journey to the Pacific Ocean; the town of Quesnel, British Columbia is named for him. Another son Frédéric-Auguste became a lawyer and politician; his daughter Mélanie married lawyer Côme-Séraphin Cherrier.

== Works ==
- Colas et Colinette, a vaudeville (1788)
- Lucas et Cecile, an operetta
- L'Anglomanie, a comedy in verse
- Les Républicains Français, a comedy in prose, afterward published in Paris
- "L'Épître à M. Labadie" – poem

== See also ==
- Music of Canada
