= John Forsyth (loyalist) =

John Forsyth (December 8, 1762 – December 27, 1837) was a partner in the influential commercial house of Forsyth, Richardson & Co. He was a politician, co-founder and vice-president of the Bank of Montreal, and Colonel of the Royal Montreal Cavalry. He founded the Montreal Hunt in 1826 and was a member of the Beaver Club. He is the ancestor of the Forsyth-Grants of Ecclesgreig Castle.

== Early years ==
Coat of Arms of John Forsyth

Born at Huntly, Aberdeenshire, he was the fifth son of William Forsyth (b.1721) 4th Laird of Tailzerton, and his wife Jean, daughter of George Phynn, Lord of the Corse of Monelly. He was a first cousin of the politician Edward Ellice through the influential Phynn family.

Forsyth came to New York just before the American Revolution, but as a loyalist he removed to Quebec. He joined his brother, Thomas, at Montreal, Quebec. They worked in the Montreal offices of their uncle's merchant's firm Phynn, Ellice & Co., of London. When Ellice died in 1790, the Forsyth brothers and their first cousin John Richardson became partners of what was from then known as Forsyth, Richardson & Co., of Montreal. Much of their business was centred on the fur trade and they became partners in the North West Company for a period. John Forsyth focused on the smooth day-to-day running of the company, leaving his forceful cousin to drive it forward.

== Bank of Montreal ==
Forsyth played a supporting role in Richardson's abortive effort to establish the Canada Banking Company in 1792. He was among the founders, with Richardson, of the Bank of Montreal in 1817, and their firm, as well as Forsyth and Richardson individually, subscribed the maximum 20 shares each. Forsyth served as a director of the bank from 1817 to 1820 and as vice-president in 1825–26.

== Militia, church and politics ==
Forsyth was commissioned an ensign in the Montreal Battalion of British Militia in 1797, and he reached the rank of lieutenant-colonel of the Royal Montreal Cavalry by 1828. He served as a captain with the Montreal Incorporated Volunteers during the War of 1812 and was granted land for his services. He was made a justice of the peace in 1821 and was a life governor of the Montreal General Hospital. Diligent in support of Richardson during the founding of the Montreal Committee of Trade in 1822, he was elected its first chairman but declined the honour and was replaced by Thomas Blackwood. He was largely inactive in the affairs of his church, the Scotch Presbyterian Church, later known as St Gabriel Street Church. In 1827, Forsyth was appointed to the Legislative Council of Lower Canada on Lord Dalhousie’s recommendation. However, unlike many prominent businessmen, and most notably his partner, Forsyth was not offered, or did not he accept any great number of government appointments.

== Personal life ==
From the 1790s at least, Forsyth was part of the social circuit on which the upper echelon of the Montreal business community prided itself. Jacob Mountain dined in a large company at Forsyth’s home in 1794: "The house itself is elegant, and the dinner splendid... People here are fond of good living and take care to want no luxury". Forsyth's political and social views and activities were representative of those of the most prominent business figures in Montreal. In the 1790s he had welcomed into his home refugees from the French Revolution. Forsyth founded the Montreal Hunt in 1826 and was a member of the Beaver Club at Montreal.

== Family and final years ==
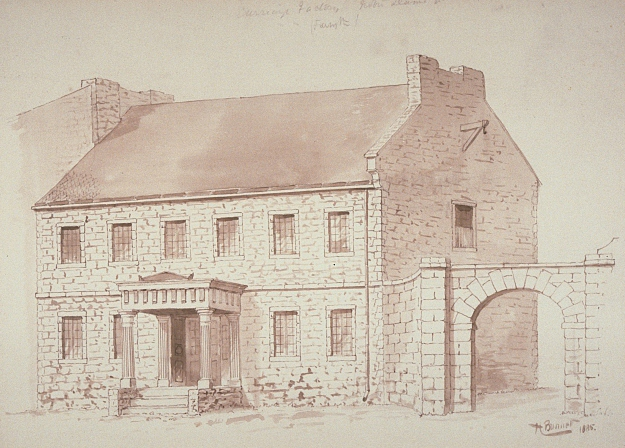
John Forsyth's home on Notre Dame Street, Montreal

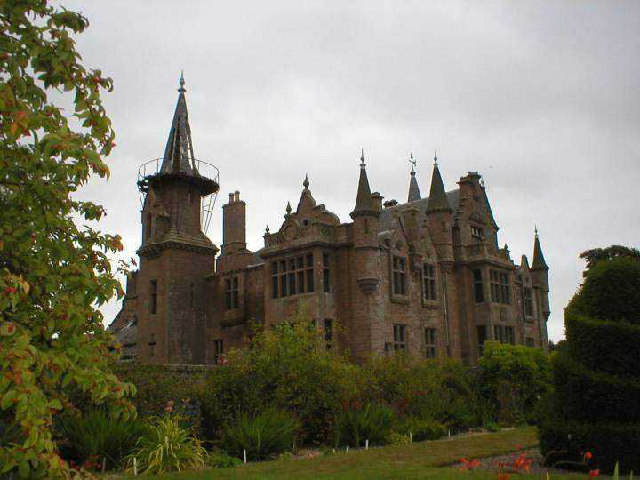
Ecclesgreig Castle, inherited by John Forsyth's eldest son through the Grants

In 1798, at St Andrew's Church, Quebec, Forsyth married Margaret Grant (1777-1818), daughter of Charles Grant (d.1784), a prominent Quebec merchant from an influential Scots-Quebecer family trading between London and Canada. Charles was the third son of the Laird of Kincorth and a grandson of Grant of Glenbeg, whose portrait hung at Castle Grant. Mrs Forsyth's mother, Jane Holmes (1750-1805), afterwards married The Hon. John Blackwood. The Forsyths were the parents of two sons and a daughter, all of whom married within Forsyth's business circle:

- William Forsyth-Grant (1804-1863) J.P., D.L., succeeded his uncle, Frederick Grant, to Ecclesgreig Castle, taking the additional name of 'Grant'. He married his first cousin, Euretta Forsyth, daughter of Joseph Forsyth, of Kingston, Upper Canada; sister of James Bell Forsyth. Their eldest son was Aide-de-camp to Queen Victoria. Their third son married a daughter of The Hon. John Beverley Robinson.
- John Blackwood Forsyth (1805-1891), married a daughter of Samuel Gerrard.
- Jane Prescott Forsyth (1807-1869), married Captain George Gregory of the 19th Light Dragoons. He was the son of John Gregory, of Montreal, a former colleague of Jane's father in the North West Company and a fellow member of the Beaver Club.

A nephew, James Bell Forsyth, represented Forsyth, Richardson at Quebec City, in association with William Walker from 1821. Richardson died in May 1831, and for a time Forsyth carried on. In August he informed his first cousin Edward Ellice that he was "on the best of terms" with Governor Lord Aylmer and "an intimate and old friend" of Aylmer's civil secretary, John Baskerville Glegg, and he offered to use these advantages to promote the development of Ellice's seigneury of Villechauve, more commonly known as Beauharnois, the management of which Forsyth, Richardson had long supervised. Forsyth spent his last years in Britain, where he died in 1837. Forsyth, Richardson & Co., survived until 1847 when it and Forsyth, Walker and Company were dissolved.
