= Jules-Maurice Quesnel =

Canadian fur trader and political figure (1786-1842)

- Born: Julien-Maurice Quesnel; October 25, 1786; Montreal, Canada East
- Died: May 20, 1842 (aged 55); Montreal
- Education: Collège Saint-Raphaël
- Occupations: Fur trader, businessman, political figure

Jules-Maurice Quesnel (October 25, 1786 – May 20, 1842) was a fur trader, member of the Beaver Club, businessman and political figure in Canada East.

He was born Julien-Maurice Quesnel in Montreal in 1786, the son of Joseph Quesnel, and studied at the Collège Saint-Raphaël. He joined the North West Company as a clerk and assisted David Thompson in his explorations in 1805 and 1806. He travelled with Simon Fraser on his exploration of the Fraser River in 1808. The Quesnel River, Quesnel Lake, the town of Quesnel, and Jules Quesnel Elementary School in Vancouver, British Columbia are named after him.

In 1811, he returned east and served in the Montreal militia during the War of 1812, reaching the rank of lieutenant. He then moved to Kingston and later York as a merchant, finally settling in Montreal. With a partner, John Spread Baldwin, he became involved in the buying and selling of goods, including the export of timber and flour and owned shares in steamships operating in the region. Quesnel was named a justice of the peace, also served as warden of Trinity House at Montreal from 1830 to 1839 and was a member of the commission for the Montreal harbour. In 1838, he was named to the special council that governed Lower Canada after the Lower Canada Rebellion and, in 1841, he was named to the Legislative Council of the Province of Canada. He died in Montreal in 1842 and was buried in the parish church of Notre Dame.

== Family ==
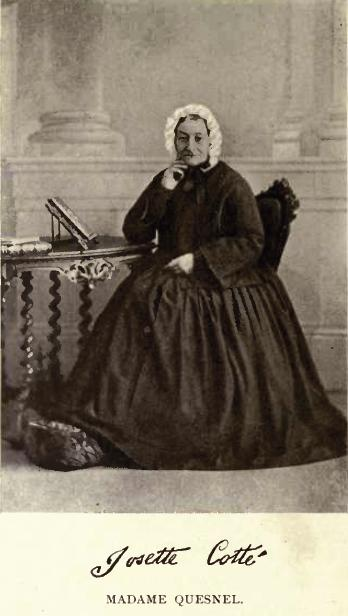
Madame Marie Josette Quesnel by William Notman

His brother Frédéric-Auguste was a member of the legislative assembly and legislative council. Jules-Maurice Quesnel, an advocate married in June 1816, Marie Josette Cotte, daughter of Gabriel Cotte, and his wife, Angelique Blondeau, who had founded the Catholic Orphan Asylum in Montreal, Quebec. His sisters-in-law were Madame Francois Antoine Larocque and Madame Alexis Laframboise. Jules-Maurice Quesnel died in May 1842, aged 54. His widow died June 6, 1866.

== Legacy ==
There is an elementary school in Vancouver that bears his name: Jules Quesnel Elementary School.
