= Joseph-Édouard Faribault =

Canadian politician (1773–1859)

Joseph-Édouard Faribault (May 4, 1773 – August 3, 1859) was a notary and political figure in Lower Canada. He represented Leinster in the Legislative Assembly of Lower Canada from 1808 to 1809.

He was born in Berthier-en-Haut, the son of Barthélemy Faribault, a notary, and Catherine-Antoine Véronneau. Faribault worked in his father's office as a clerk and was commissioned as a notary in 1791. He first set up practice in Berthier-en-Haut but soon afterwards moved to L'Assomption. He was married twice: first, in 1794, to Marie-Anne-Élisabeth Poudret and then to Geneviève Fauteux, the widow of Norbert Éno, in 1845. Faribault invested in real estate and built and operated sawmills and flour mills. He also served as administrator and agent for the seigneury of Lavaltrie. His daughter Aurélie inherited parts of the seigneuries of L'Assomption and Repentigny from her two husbands, Charles Saint-Ours and Louis-Michel Viger. Faribault was a member of the special council that governed Quebec after the suspension of the constitution in 1838. He served as warden for Leinster District in 1841 and 1842 and mayor of L'Assomption from 1846 to 1848. He also was justice of the peace for Montreal district, commissioner for the summary trial of small causes and commissioner for the taking of oaths of allegiance. He served in the militia during the War of 1812, reaching the rank of lieutenant-colonel. Faribault opposed the founding of Collège de L'Assomption but later contributed funds to aid in its operation. He died in L'Assomption at the age of 86.

His nephew Barthélemy Joliette served in the assemblies for Lower Canada and the Province of Canada.
