= Edwin Henry King =

Canadian banker

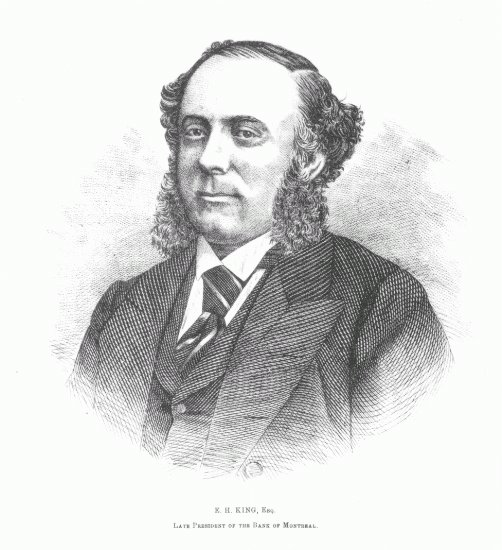
- Born: December 1828; Ireland
- Died: April 14, 1896; Monte Carlo
- Occupation: banker
- Known for: President of the Bank of Montreal

Edwin Henry King (December 1828 – April 14, 1896) was a Canadian banker.

Born in Ireland, King emigrated to Canada in 1850. He joined the Bank of Montreal in 1857, became general manager at age 35. He held the manager position from 1863 to 1869 and was president of the bank from 1869 to 1873, the youngest person to hold that position.

King was ruthless in his promotion of the Bank of Montreal and was described as "a little god who dares to treat the representatives of all other banks" in an insulting manner, a "truculent and uncompromising" fellow, and "very peculiar." He moved the bank into the professional realm, focusing on commercial credit. His personality and business practices angered many Toronto capitalists leading one of the bank's directors, Senator William McMaster, to found the Canadian Bank of Commerce. Taking advantage of the instability caused by the American Civil War, he positioned the Bank of Montreal to be the leading bank in the New York gold market. The Bank became the primary fiscal agent for the government of Canada. King advocated for a new banking system which would have benefited larger, more stable banks like the Bank of Montreal triggering a political backlash that led to the passage of the Bank Act in 1871. Historian Oscar Douglas Skelton called him "the most striking figure in Canadian banking history".

Business positions
Preceded by Thomas Brown Anderson	President of the Bank of Montreal; 1869-1873	Succeeded by David Torrance
