= Préfontaine station =

Montreal Metro station

Préfontaine
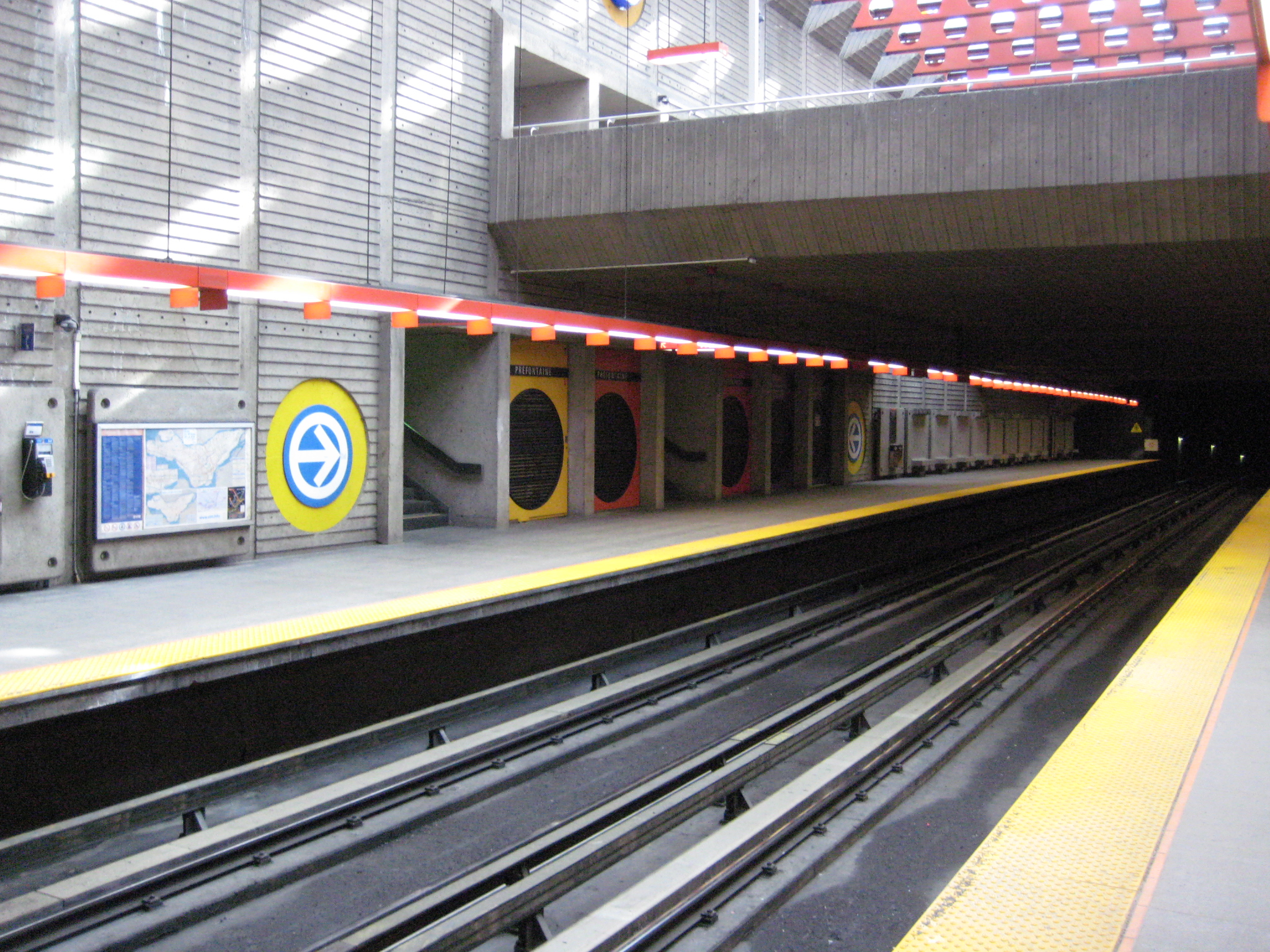

General information
- Location: 3100 and 3105, Hochelaga Street; Montreal, Quebec H1W 1G3; Canada
- Coordinates: 45°32′30″N 73°33′16″W
- Operator: Société de transport de Montréal
- Platforms: 2 side platforms
- Tracks: 2
- Connections: STM bus

Construction
- Depth: 12.2 metres (40 feet), 43rd deepest
- Accessible: Yes
- Architect: Henri Brillon

Other information
- Fare zone: ARTM: A

History
- Opened: 6 June 1976

Passengers
- 2024: 1,932,715 ▲6.11%
- Rank: 51 of 68

Services
Preceding station	Montreal Metro	Following station
Frontenac toward Angrignon	Green Line	Joliette toward Honoré-Beaugrand
Location

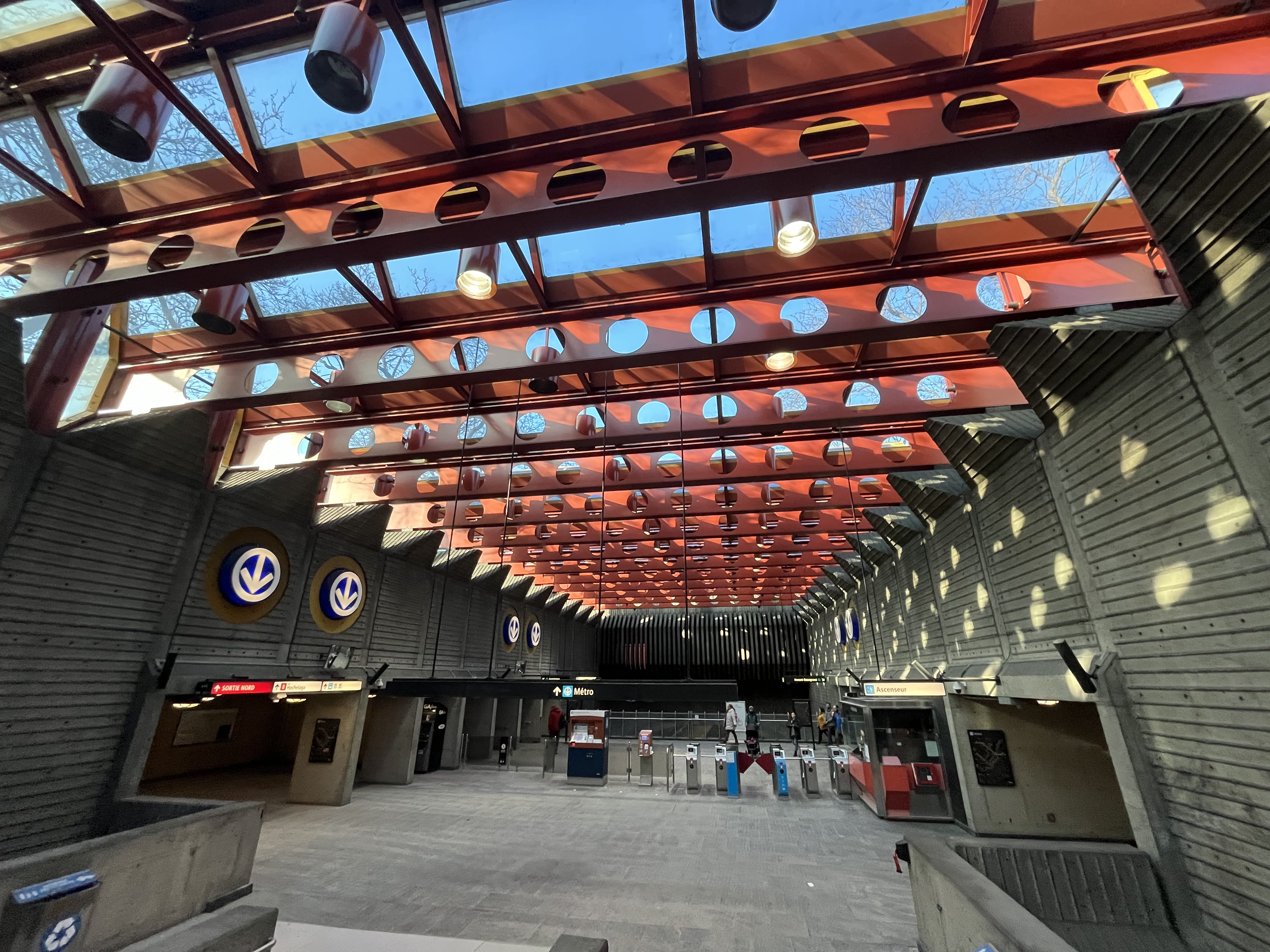
Interior of station

Préfontaine station (French pronunciation: [pʁefɔ̃tɛn]) is a Montreal Metro station in the borough of Mercier–Hochelaga-Maisonneuve in Montreal, Quebec, Canada. It is operated by the Société de transport de Montréal (STM) and serves the Green Line. It is in the district of Hochelaga-Maisonneuve. It opened on June 6, 1976, as part of the extension of the Green Line to Honoré-Beaugrand station.

== Overview ==
Designed by Henri Brillon, it is a normal side platform station, built partly in tunnel with a large open cut containing an entrance, the mezzanine and admitting natural light. A secondary entrance is located to the north of rue Hochelaga.

In 2019, work began to install elevators at the station. On November 8, 2021, the station became accessible with the opening of three elevators, becoming the 18th accessible station in Montreal.

== Origin of the name ==
The station is so named because it lies under the west side of parc Raymond-Préfontaine, close to rue Préfontaine. These were named for Raymond Préfontaine (1850–1905), mayor of the former city of Hochelaga, and subsequently mayor of Montreal (1898–1902).

== Connecting bus routes ==
Société de transport de Montréal
No.	Route	Connects to	Service times / notes
25	Angus	Rosemont	Weekdays only
29	Rachel		Daily
85	Hochelaga	Honoré-Beaugrand; Pie-IX BRT; Joliette; Frontenac	Daily
362 ☾	Hochelaga / Notre-Dame	Honoré-Beaugrand; Joliette; Frontenac	Night service

== Nearby points of interest ==
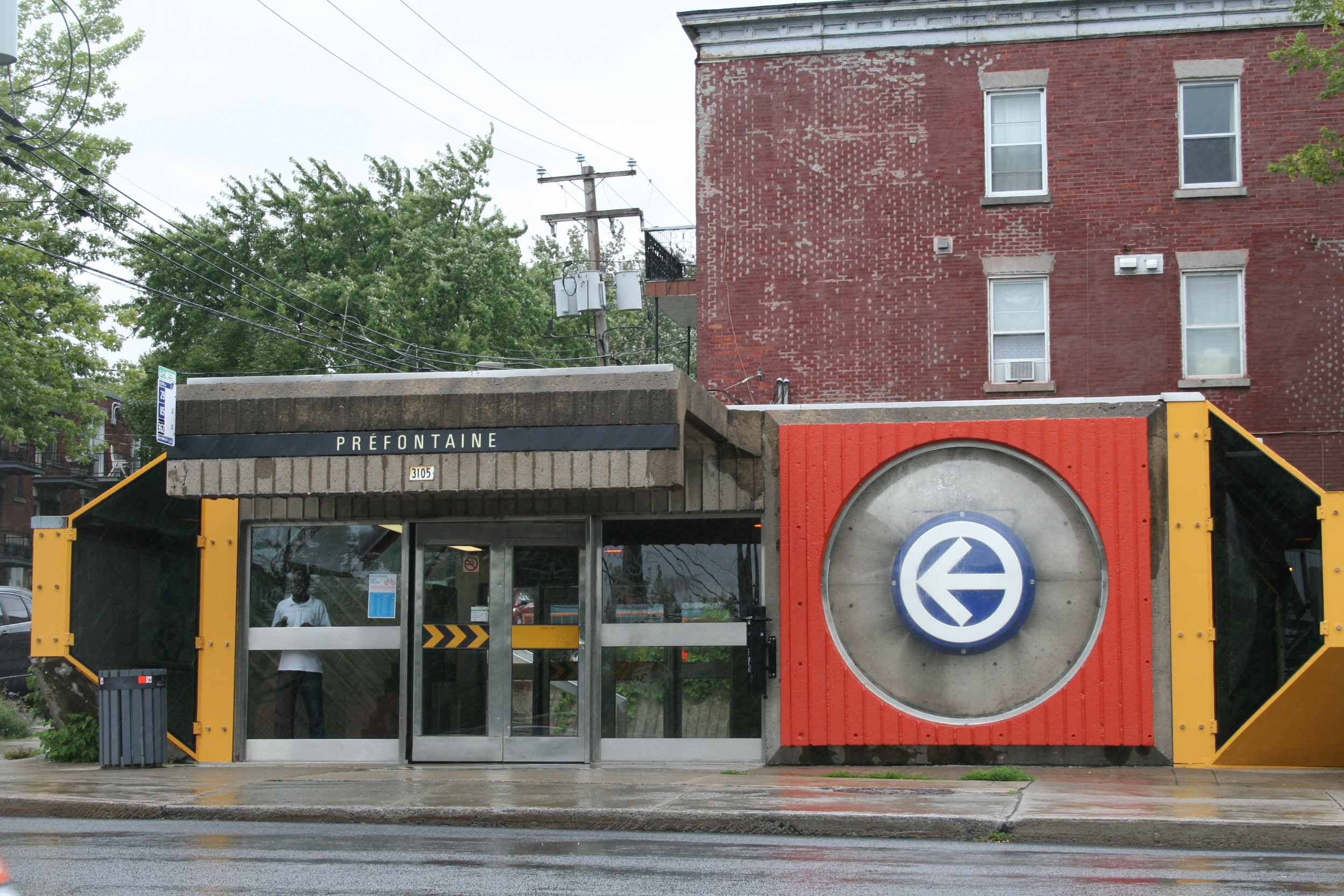
Southbound bus stop on the west side of rue Hochelaga

- Centre hospitalier J-Henri-Charbonneau
- Centre commercial Maisonneuve
- Héma-Québec
- Parc et aréna Raymond-Préfontaine
- Teccart Institute
- Technopôle Angus
