= James Bell Forsyth =

Canadian merchant and author

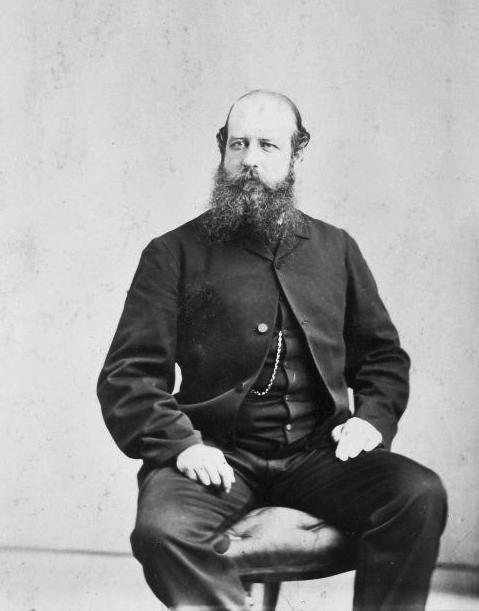
James Bell Forsyth in 1865

James Bell Forsyth (25 December 1802 – 1 April 1869), was a Quebec merchant and writer. In 1831, he built the Cataraqui Estate in Sillery, on Saint-Louis Road.

== Background ==
Born at Kingston, Upper Canada, he was the second son of Joseph Forsyth (1764–1813) and his wife Alicia, daughter of Major James Robbins of the Royal Artillery. The Forsyths were an influential merchant family with strong commercial ties to England, Scotland and the colonies. Through his grandparents he was connected to the important London trading house of Phyn, Ellice & Co., a subsidiary of which was Forsyth, Richardson & Co., of Montreal, where two of his uncles, Thomas and John Forsyth, were partners; this firm prospered in the fur trade and expanded into other activities such as the agent and forwarding business. Another of his uncles, James Forsyth, was associated with Lloyd's of London. James Bell Forsyth's father, Joseph Forsyth, came to Canada, in 1784, as the agent for Forsyth, Richardson & Co., at Kingston, Ontario. Forsyth was educated there and in England.

== Business career ==
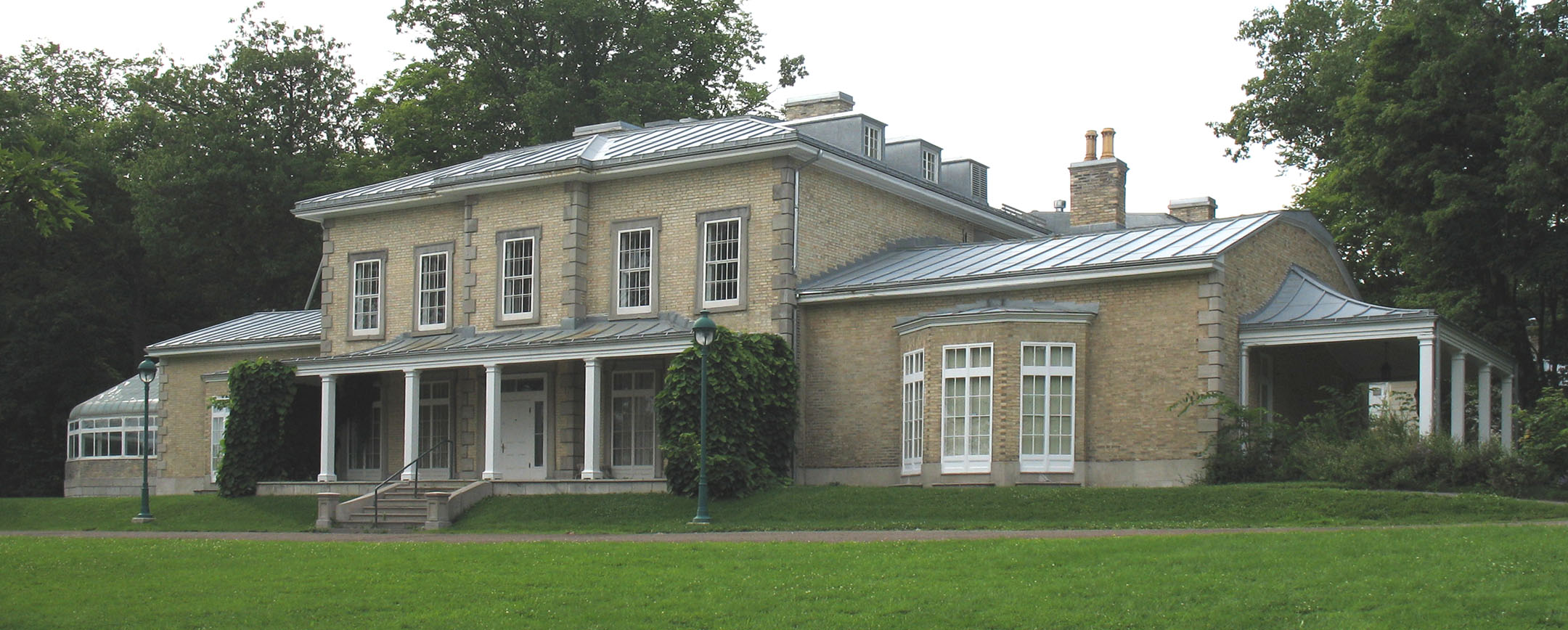
James Bell Forsyth's Quebec home, Domaine Cataraqui

In 1821, he went into partnership with The Hon. William Walker M.P., and together they succeeded Forsyth's father as the agents to Forsyth, Richardson & Co., in Kingston, Ontario.

== Family ==
In 1828, he married Frances, the second daughter of Mathew Bell. His business partner, William Walker, also married one of Bell's daughters, and their brothers-in-law included Lt.-Colonel John George Irvine (son of James Irvine), a Quebec businessman and The Hon. Edward Greive M.P. James and Frances Forsyth were the grandparents of General Sir Henry Edward Burstall and The Hon. George Irvine.

James Bell Forsyth died on 1 April 1869, of a heart attack, at the age of 66-years-old. He was buried on 5 April 1869, at Mount Hermon Cemetery, located at a short distance down Saint-Louis Road from his estate of Cataraqui. His son Joseph Bell Forsyth and son-in-law John Burstall were recorded in the parish register as having been present.
