= Joliette station (Montreal Metro) =

Montreal Metro station

Joliette
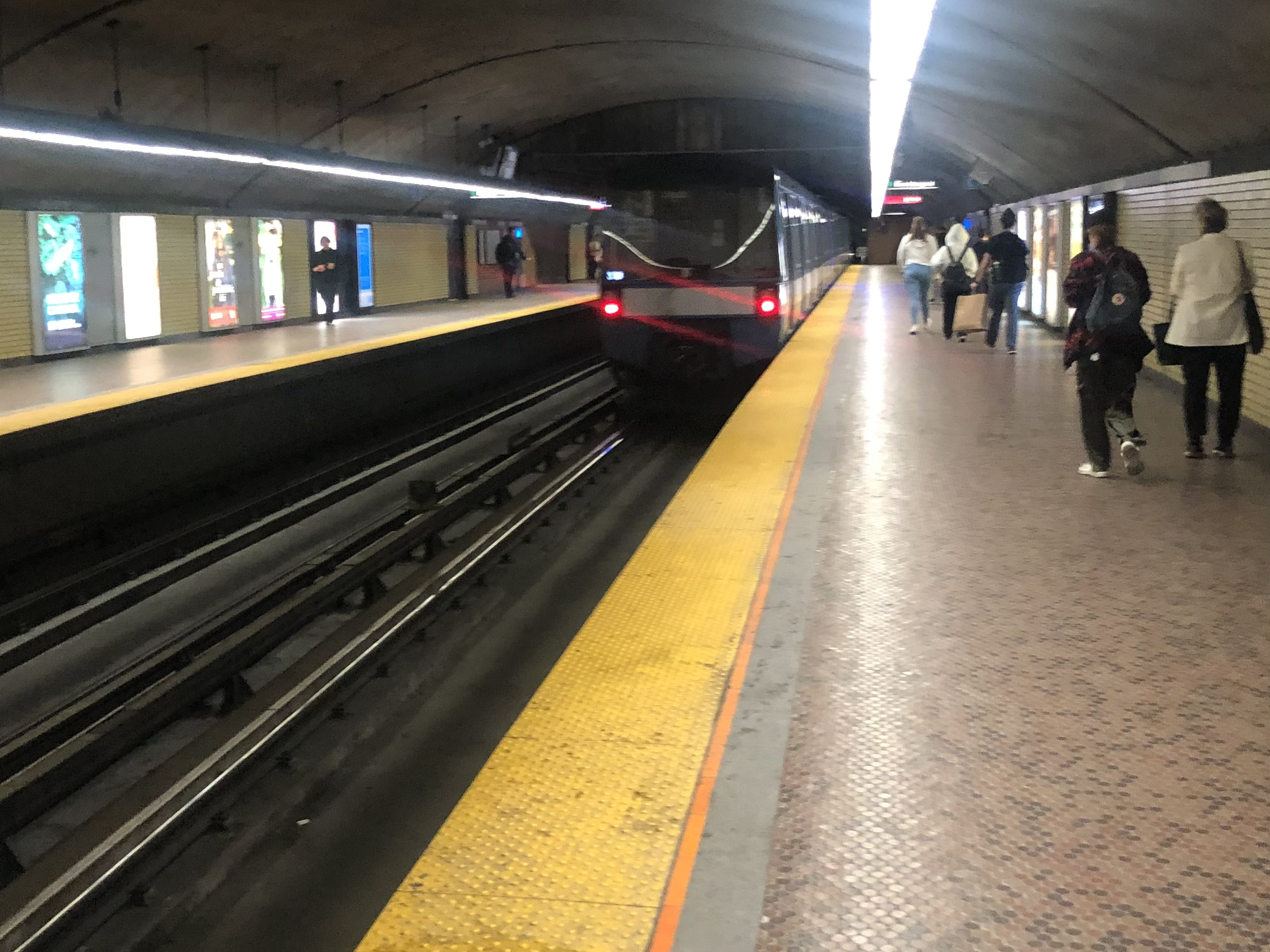

General information
- Location: 3575 and 3580, Hochelaga Street; Montreal, Quebec H1W 1H9; Canada
- Coordinates: 45°32′49″N 73°33′05″W
- Operator: Société de transport de Montréal
- Platforms: 2 side platforms
- Tracks: 2
- Connections: STM bus

Construction
- Depth: 14.3 metres (46 feet 11 inches), 37th deepest
- Accessible: No
- Architect: Marcel Raby

Other information
- Fare zone: ARTM: A

History
- Opened: 6 June 1976

Passengers
- 2024: 2,719,319 ▲7.95%
- Rank: 37 of 68

Services
Preceding station	Montreal Metro	Following station
Préfontaine toward Angrignon	Green Line	Pie-IX toward Honoré-Beaugrand
Location

Joliette station (French pronunciation: [ʒɔljɛt]) is a Montreal Metro station in the borough of Mercier–Hochelaga-Maisonneuve in Montreal, Quebec, Canada. It is operated by the Société de transport de Montréal (STM) and serves the Green Line. It is located in the district of Hochelaga-Maisonneuve. The station opened on June 6, 1976, as part of the extension of the Green Line to Honoré-Beaugrand station.

== Overview ==
Designed by architect Marcel Raby, it is a normal side platform station built in tunnel. The walls of the platform have a unique yellow brick façade. It has no transept, with closed staircases leading to the mezzanine above; this gives access to two exits, one on either side of rue Hochelaga. The mezzanine contains a large illuminated mural sculpture by the architect, entitled Thème des mouvements du soleil ("theme of the sun's motion").

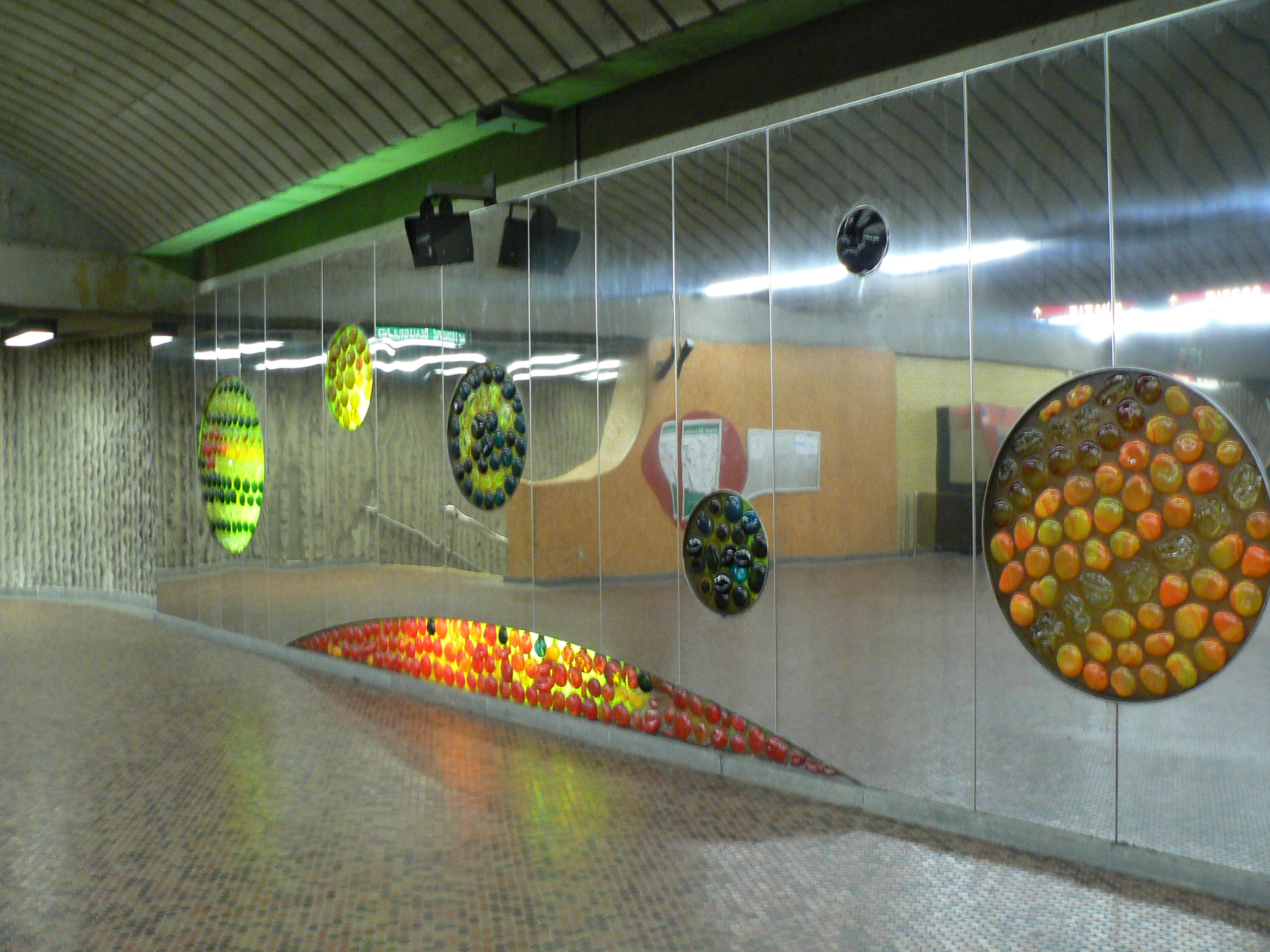
Station mural

== Origin of the name ==
This station is named for rue Joliette. Barthélémy Joliette (1789–1850) served in the House of Assembly and Legislative Council of Lower Canada; he also founded the village of L'Industrie (later Joliette, Quebec).

== Connecting bus routes ==
Société de transport de Montréal
No.	Route	Connects to	Service times / notes
29	Rachel	Préfontaine	Daily
67	Saint-Michel	Saint-Michel	Daily
85	Hochelaga	Honoré-Beaugrand; Pie-IX BRT; Préfontaine; Frontenac	Daily
362 ☾	Hochelaga / Notre-Dame	Honoré-Beaugrand; Préfontaine; Frontenac	Night service
467	Express Saint-Michel	Saint-Michel	Weekdays only

== Nearby points of interest ==
- Collège de Maisonneuve
- CLSC Hochelaga-Maisonneuve
  - See also CLSC
- Parc Lalancette
