= Louis Jolliet =

Explorer of North America (1645–1700)

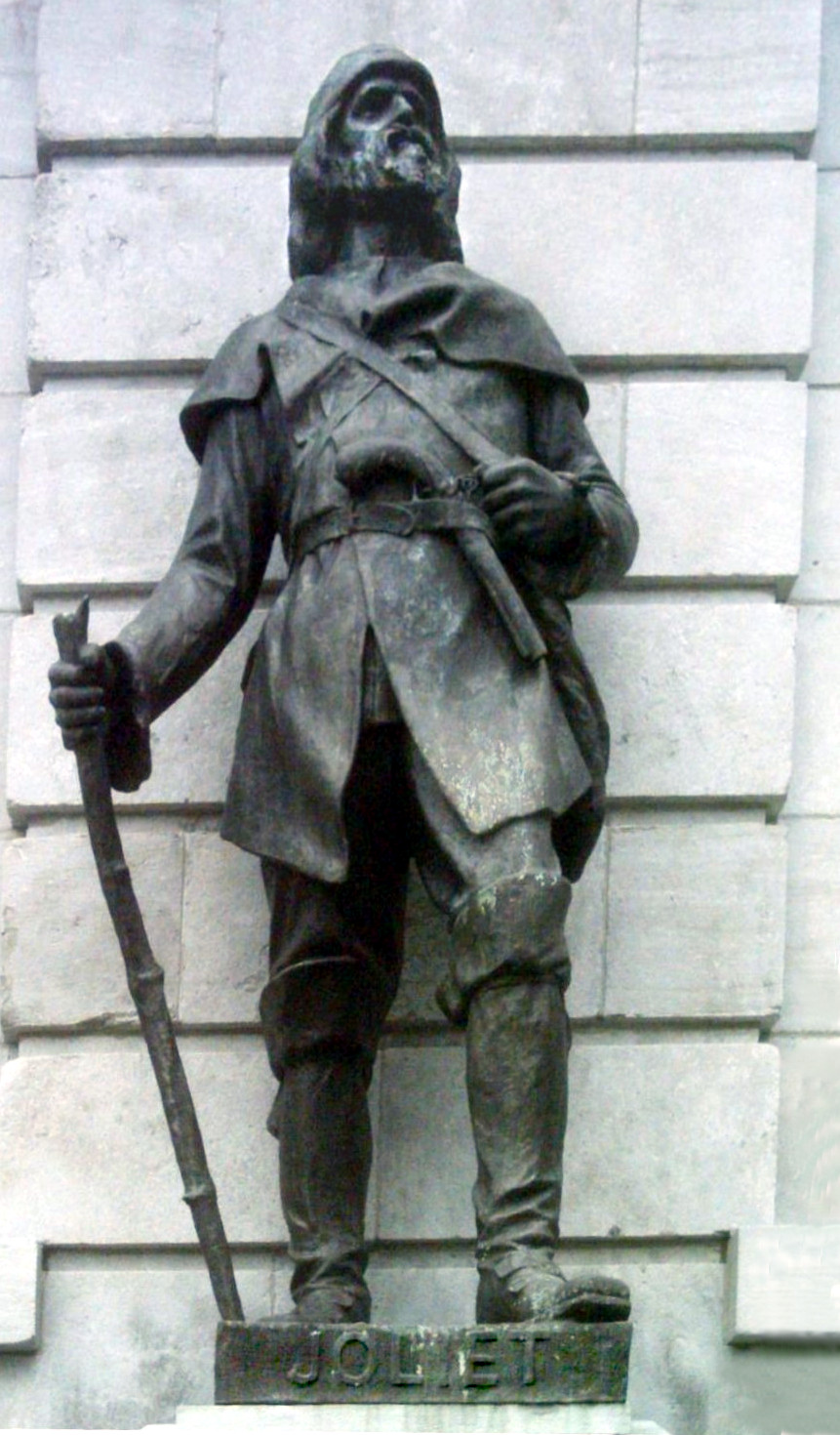
- Alfred Laliberté's Louis Jolliet sculpture in front of Parliament Building (Quebec)
- Born: September 21, 1645 near Quebec, New France
- Died: 1700 (aged 54–55) en route from Quebec to Anticosti Island
- Relatives: Jean Jolliet: Father
- Military career
- Allegiance: New France (Canada)
- Awards: Jolliet was granted land south of Quebec in return for his favours
- Other work: Canadian explorer

Louis Jolliet (French pronunciation: [lwi ʒɔljɛ]; September 21, 1645 – after May 1700) was a French-Canadian explorer known for his discoveries in North America. In 1673, Jolliet and Jacques Marquette, a Jesuit Catholic priest and missionary, were the first non-Natives to explore and map the Upper Mississippi River.

== Early life ==
Jolliet was born in 1645 in Beaupré, a French settlement near Quebec City, to Jean Jolliet and Marie D'Abancourt. When he was six, his father died; his mother married a successful merchant, Geoffroy Guillot dit Lavalle; he died in 1665. Shortly after the passing of his mother's second husband, she married Martin Prevost. She died in 1678. Jolliet's stepfather owned land on the Ile d'Orleans, an island in the Saint Lawrence River in Quebec that was home to First Nations. Jolliet spent much time on Ile d'Orleans, so he likely began speaking Indigenous languages of the Americas at a young age. Besides French, he also learned English and Spanish. During his childhood, Quebec was the center of the French fur trade. The Natives were part of daily life in Quebec, and Jolliet grew up knowing much about them. Jolliet entered a Jesuit school in Quebec as a child and focused on philosophical and religious studies, aiming for the priesthood. He also studied music, becoming a skilled harpsichordist and church organist. He received Holy Orders in 1662 but abandoned his plans to become a priest, leaving the seminary in 1667 to pursue fur trading.

== Exploration of the Upper Mississippi ==
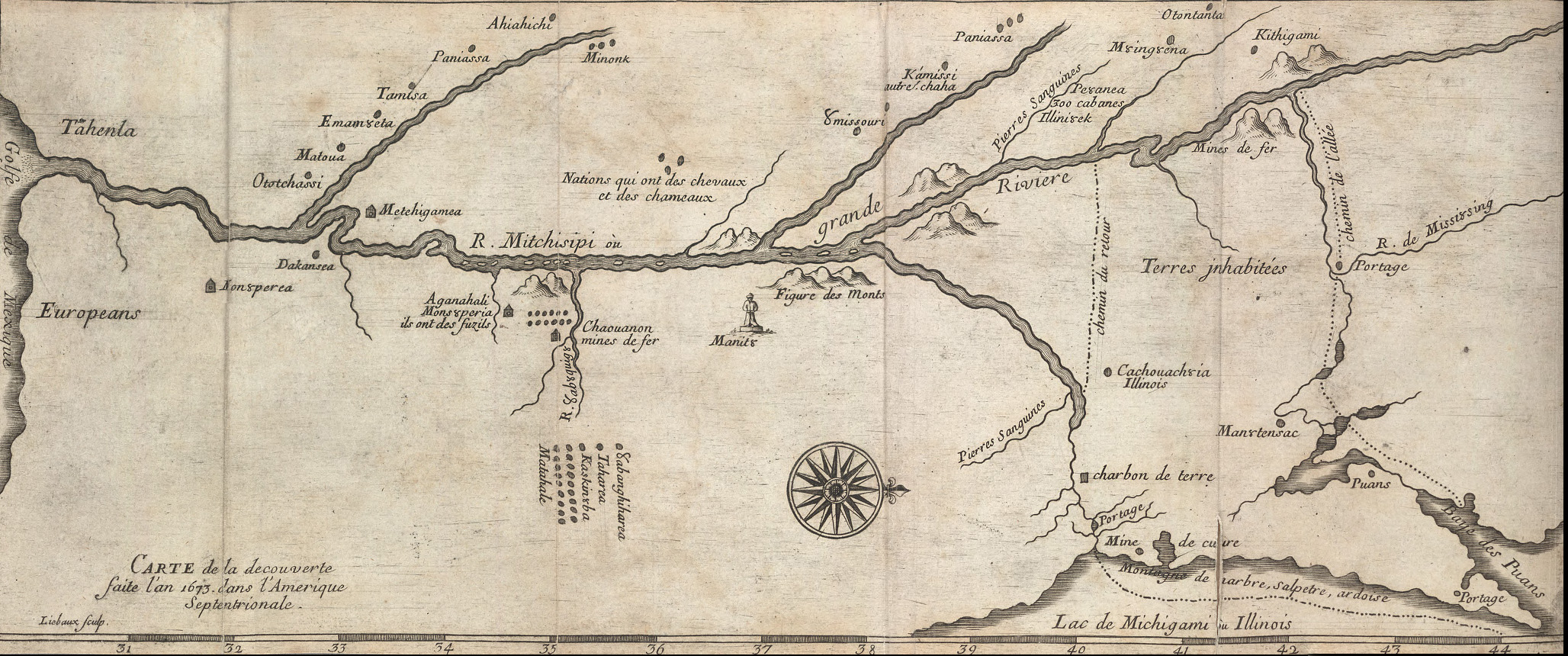
Ca. 1681 map of Marquette and Jolliet's 1673 expedition.

While Hernando de Soto was the first European to make an official note of the Mississippi River by discovering its southern entrance in 1541, Jolliet and Marquette were the first to locate its upper reaches and travel most of its length, about 130 years later. De Soto had named the river Rio del Espiritu Santo, but tribes along its length called it variations of "Mississippi," meaning "Great River" in the Algonquian languages.

On May 17, 1673, Jolliet and Marquette departed from St. Ignace, Michigan, with two canoes and five other voyageurs of French-Indian ancestry. The group sailed to Green Bay. They paddled upstream (southward) on the Fox River to the site now known as Portage, Wisconsin. There, they portaged a distance of slightly less than two miles through marsh and oak forest to the Wisconsin River. Europeans eventually built a trading post at that shortest convenient portage between the Great Lakes and Mississippi River basins. On June 17, the canoeists ventured onto the Mississippi River near present-day Prairie du Chien, Wisconsin.

The Jolliet-Marquette expedition paddled along the west bank of the Mississippi until mid-July. When they passed the mouth of the Arkansas River, they became satisfied that they had established that the Mississippi flowed into the Gulf of Mexico. By this point, they had encountered natives carrying European goods and worried about a possible hostile encounter with explorers or colonists from Spain. The voyageurs followed the Mississippi back to the mouth of the Illinois River, which friendly natives told them was a shorter route back to the Great Lakes. Following the Illinois river upstream, they turned up its tributary, the Des Plaines River near modern-day Joliet, Illinois. They continued up the Des Plaines River and portaged their canoes and gear at the Chicago Portage. They followed the Chicago River downstream until they reached Lake Michigan near modern-day Chicago. Father Marquette stayed at the mission of St. Francis Xavier at the southern end of Green Bay, which they reached in August. Jolliet returned to Quebec to relate the news of their discoveries. On his way through the Lachine Rapids, Jolliet's canoe overturned, and his records were lost. His brief narrative, written from memory, is in essential agreement with Marquette's, the chief account of the journey.

== Later years ==
Jolliet married Claire-Françoise Byssot de la Valtrie. Like Jolliet, she was Canadian-born, a daughter of Francois Byssot de la Riviere and his wife Marie Couillard. Claire Francoise was also a sister of Louise Byssot de la Valtrie, wife of Seraphin de Margane, Seigneur de la Valtrie. In 1680, Jolliet was granted the Island of Antwhere by Louis XIV as a reward, where he created a fort and maintained soldiers. In 1693, he was appointed "Royal Hydrographer," and on April 30, 1697, he was granted a seigneury southwest of Quebec City, which he named Jolliest.

In 1694, he sailed from the Gulf of St. Lawrence north along the coast of Labrador as far north as Zoar, a voyage of five and a half months. He recorded details of the country, navigation, the Inuit and their customs. His journal ("Journal de Louis Jolliet allant à la decouverte de Labrador, 1694") is the earliest known detailed survey of the Labrador coast from the Strait of Belle Isle to Zoar.

In May 1700, Louis Jolliet left for Anticosti Island in the Gulf of St. Lawrence. He then disappears from the historical record. There is no record of his death or burial place, and the sole record of his fate is the notation that a Mass for his soul was said in Quebec on September 15, 1700.

== Legacy ==
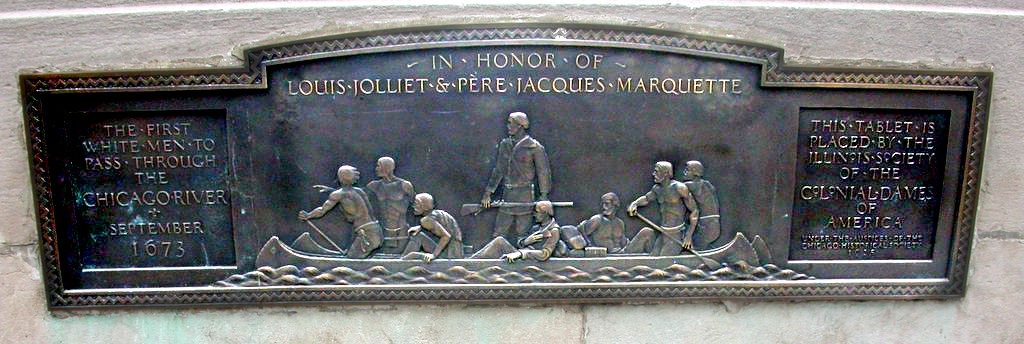
Plaque commemorating Jolliet in Chicago.

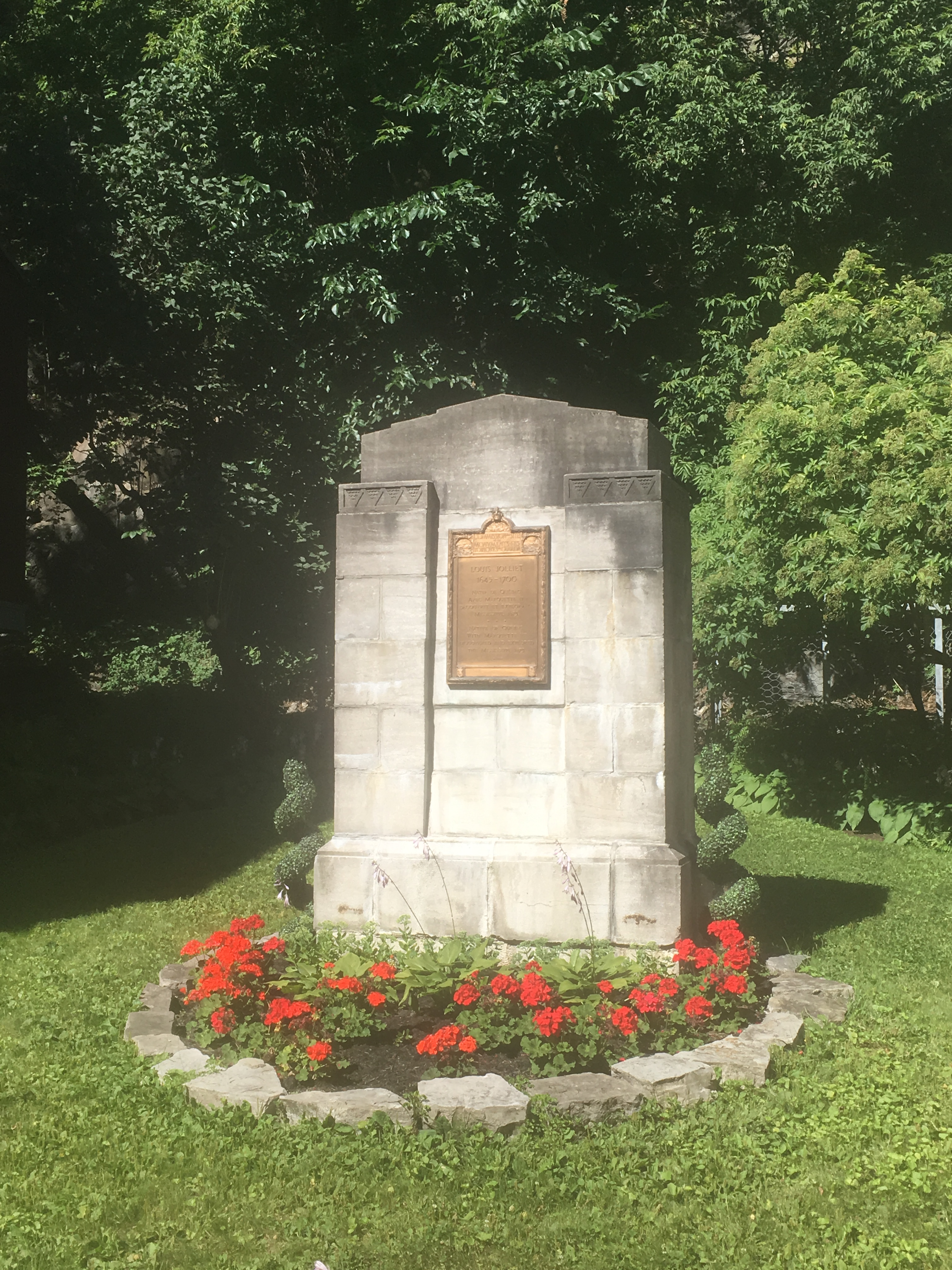
Monument commemorating Jolliet in Quebec City.

Jolliet's main legacy is most tangible in the Midwestern United States and Quebec, mostly through geographical names, including the cities of Joliet, Illinois; Joliet, Montana; and Joliette, Quebec (founded by one of Jolliet's descendants, Barthélemy Joliette).

The several variations in the spelling of the name "Jolliet" reflect a time when illiteracy or poor literacy was common and spelling was unstandardized. Jolliet's descendants live throughout eastern Canada and the United States.

The Jolliet Squadron of cadets at the Royal Military College Saint-Jean in the Province of Quebec was named in Jolliet's honor. A street in Montreal, Quebec, is named after him. The Louis Jolliet rose, developed by Agriculture and Agri-Food Canada, was named in his honor. Joliet Junior College in Joliet, Illinois, is named after the explorer, and numerous high schools in North America. The Louis Joliet Mall in Joliet, Illinois, is named for the explorer. A cruise ship sailing out of Quebec City is also named in his honour.

Jolliet appears with Jacques Marquette on a 1968 United States postage stamp honoring their exploratory voyage.

== See also ==
- French colonization of the Americas
