= Peter McGill =

Scots-Quebecer businessman

The Honourable Peter McGill
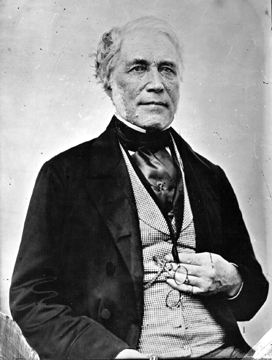

2nd Mayor of Montreal
- In office 1840–1842
- Preceded by: Jacques Viger
- Succeeded by: Joseph Bourret

Personal details
- Born: August 1789 as Peter McCutcheon Creebridge, Wigtownshire, Scotland
- Died: September 28, 1860 (aged 71) Montreal, Lower Canada
- Profession: Businessman

Peter McGill (August 1789 – September 28, 1860) was a Scots-Quebecer businessman who served as the second mayor of Montreal from 1840 to 1842.

== Biography ==
He was born Peter McCutcheon in the village of Creebridge, Wigtownshire (now Dumfries and Galloway) in Scotland. His parents were John McCutcheon and his second wife, Mary McGill. McGill arrived in Montreal in 1809. In 1821, he changed his name when he became the heir of his uncle John McGill, at the latter's request and the death of his aunt Mary in 1819.

McGill held a seat in the Legislative Council of Lower Canada from 1832 to 1837, the Special Council of Lower Canada from 1838 to 1841, and the Legislative Council of the United Provinces from 1841 to 1860.

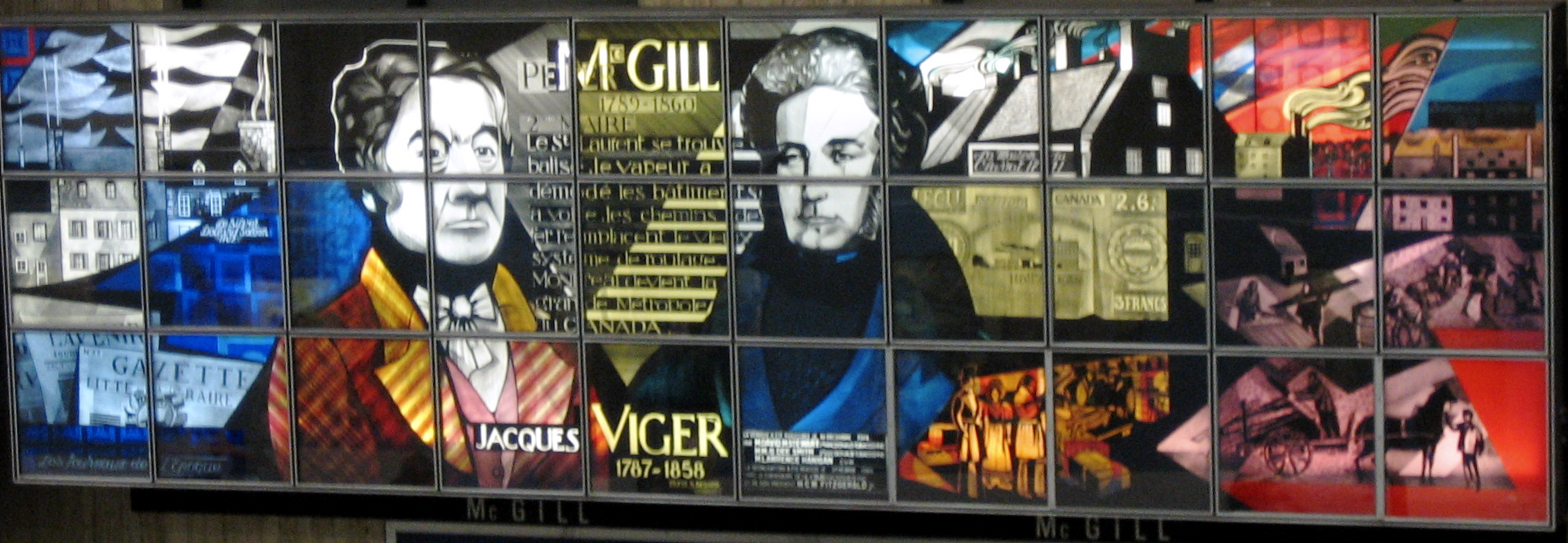
Peter McGill's image in stained glass in the McGill Station of the Montreal Metro, next to the image of his predecessor as mayor, Jacques Viger.

McGill served as president of the Bank of Montreal from 1834 to 1860. He founded the first railway company in Canada in 1834. It is he, rather than James McGill, who is depicted in the stained-glass mural in the McGill station of the Montreal metro, even though the station is named for its proximity to McGill University.

McGill was St. Andrew's Society of Montreal's first president.

Rue Peter-McGill in Mercier-Hochelaga-Maisonneuve borough is named after him.

Business positions
Preceded by John Molson	President of the Bank of Montreal; 1834-1860	Succeeded by Thomas Brown Anderson
