= Edward Greive =

Canadian politician (1797–1845)

Edward Greive (1797 – June 2, 1845) was a businessman and political figure in Canada East. He was also the brother-in-law of William Walker and son-in-law of Mathew Bell.

He was a lumber merchant at Trois-Rivières and also acted as an agent there for Mathew Bell. In 1844, he married Catherine, Bell's daughter. Greive served in the local militia, becoming lieutenant in 1825, and later served in a volunteer company of loyalist militia organized by Mathew Bell during the Lower Canada Rebellion. In 1837, with Bell, he purchased parcels of land in Brompton and Durham townships. He was named treasurer for Trois-Rivières district in 1841. Greive was elected to the Legislative Assembly of the Province of Canada for Trois-Rivières in 1844. He served for a committee that was balloted on January 18,1845. The committee was made for the county of Lanark.

He died in office at Trois-Rivières in 1845 at 47 or 48 years old.

Political offices
Preceded by Charles Richard Ogden, Tory	MLA, District of Trois-Rivières; 1844–1845	Succeeded by Joseph-Édouard Turcotte, Moderate Reformer
