= Maurice-Régis Blondeau =

Maurice-Régis Blondeau (23 June 1734 – 13 July 1809) was a fur trader, militia officer, and office holder in Canada.

Blondeau was born into a merchant family from Montreal in New France. He became associated with the fur trade and spent his early career specializing in trade with natives of the Illinois area.

In 1757, during the French and Indian War, he went into the employ of Joseph-Michel Cadet, who was purveyor general with the French forces in New France, and spent a year at Fort St. Frédéric on Lake Champlain. After 1763 he made a successful foray into the west, visiting Fort La Reine (present day Portage la Prairie, Manitoba) and Fort Dauphin (near Winnipegosis, Manitoba), two original La Vérendrye forts. He then organized trading trips to Grand Portage (Minnesota) and Fort Michilimackinac (near present-day Mackinaw City, Michigan) for his father. His trading parties and partnerships grew larger and so did his wealth.

Blondeau became an important businessman in Montreal and was actively involved in a variety of real estate endeavors. He partnered with Joseph Quesnel on a number of business ventures. He was also a captain in the militia and a justice of the peace. Maurice-Régis was also a founder of the Beaver Club in Montreal.
