= Special Council of Lower Canada =

Administrative body of Lower Canada (1838–1841)

Type
- Type: Unicameral

History
- Founded: 1838
- Disbanded: 1841
- Preceded by: Parliament of Lower Canada
- Succeeded by: Parliament of the Province of Canada

The Special Council of Lower Canada was an appointed body which administered Lower Canada until the Union Act of 1840 created the Province of Canada. Following the Lower Canada Rebellion, on March 27, 1838, the Constitutional Act of 1791 was suspended and both the Legislative Assembly and Legislative Council were dissolved.

The Act of Union united Upper and Lower Canada into a single province with a single parliament, consisting of an upper and lower house. Upon the first meeting of this parliament, the Special Council was dissolved.

In November 1839, the Special Council approved proposals made by Governor Sydenham for the union of the two Canadas.

There were three Special Councils:

- the first, consisting of 24 members, was appointed by the acting Governor General, Sir John Colborne, and served from April 2, 1838 to June 1, 1838, when its members were dismissed by the newly arrived Governor General, Lord Durham within a week of his arrival in Canada.
- the second, appointed by Lord Durham, existed from June 28, 1838 to November 2, 1838. This council was much smaller than the first had been, with an initial membership of five (later expanded to seven). All the members of Durham's Council were British officials who had arrived in Canada as part of his entourage.
- the third, appointed by Sir John Colborne, existed from November 2, 1838 to February 10, 1841. This consisted of the same members who had been appointed in April. Lord Sydenham, who assumed office as Governor General in 1839, added twelve new members in three rounds of appointments in 1839 and 1840. None of the members of Durham's second Council served on the third Council.

== Lists of Members of the Special Council ==
First Special Council	First Appointed	No. of terms
James Cuthbert	1838	1st term
Toussaint Pothier	1838	1st term
Charles-Étienne Chaussegros de Léry	1838	1st term
James Stuart	1838	1st term
Peter McGill	1838	1st term
Marc-Pascal de Sales Laterrière	1838	1st term
Barthélemy Joliette	1838	1st term
Pierre de Rastel de Rocheblave	1838	1st term
John Neilson	1838	1st term
Amable Dionne	1838	1st term
Samuel Gerrard	1838	1st term
Jules-Maurice Quesnel	1838	1st term
William Plenderleath Christie	1838	1st term
Charles-Eusèbe Casgrain	1838	1st term
William Walker	1838	1st term
Joseph-Édouard Faribault	1838	1st term
John Molson Jr.	1838	1st term
Étienne Mayrand	1838	1st term
Paul Holland Knowlton	1838	1st term
Turton Penn	1838	1st term
Joseph Dionne	1838	1st term
Ichabod Smith	1838	1st term
Thomas Brown Anderson	1838	1st term
Thomas Austin	1838	1st term

Second Special Council	First Appointed	No. of terms
Charles Paget	1838	1st term
James Macdonell	1838	1st term
Charles Buller	1838	1st term
George Couper	1838	1st term
Charles Grey	1838	1st term
John Clitherow	1838	1st term
Arthur William Buller	1838	1st term

Third Special Council	First Appointed	No. of terms
James Cuthbert	1838	2nd term
Toussaint Pothier	1838	2nd term
Charles-Étienne Chaussegros de Léry	1838	2nd term
James Stuart	1838, 1839	2nd term*
Peter McGill	1838	2nd term
Marc-Pascal de Sales Laterrière	1838	2nd term
Barthélemy Joliette	1838	2nd term
Pierre de Rastel de Rocheblave	1838	2nd term
John Neilson	1838	2nd term
Amable Dionne	1838	2nd term
Samuel Gerrard	1838	2nd term
Jules-Maurice Quesnel	1838	2nd term
William Plenderleath Christie	1838	2nd term
Charles-Eusèbe Casgrain	1838	2nd term
William Walker	1838	2nd term
Joseph-Édouard Faribault	1838	2nd term
John Molson Jr.	1838	2nd term
Étienne Mayrand	1838	2nd term
Paul Holland Knowlton	1838	2nd term
Turton Penn	1838	2nd term
Joseph Dionne	1838	2nd term
Ichabod Smith	1838	2nd term
Thomas Austin	1838	2nd term
Dominique Mondelet	1838	1st term
George Moffatt	1838	1st term
Robert Unwin Harwood	1839	1st term
Edward Hale (uncle)	1839	1st term
Edward Hale (nephew)	1839	1st term
John Wainwright	1839	1st term
Jean-Baptiste Taché	1839	1st term
Dominick Daly	1840	1st term
Charles Richard Ogden	1840	1st term
Frederick George Heriot	1840	1st term
Henry Black	1840	1st term
Charles Dewey Day	1840	1st term

== Presiding Officer ==
The presiding member of the Special Council acted as Speaker.

- James Cuthbert Jr. 1838
- Sir James Stuart, 1st Baronet 1839-1841

== Meeting Venue ==
In 1838 the Council met at Government House in Montreal and also at Quebec City. From 1839 to 1841 the Council met in Montreal only.

== See also ==
- Constitutional history of Canada
