= William Walker (Quebec merchant) =

Canadian merchant and politician

Member of the Legislative Council of the Province of Canada
- In office 1842–1863

Personal details
- Born: 1790 Scotland
- Died: May 18, 1863 (aged 72–73)
- Party: Independent
- Occupation: merchant, politician

William Walker (c. 1790 – May 18, 1863) was a merchant in Lower Canada who served on the Legislative Council of the Province of Canada.

He was born in Scotland, and arrived in Lower Canada in 1815. He was the agent in Quebec City of the Montreal firm Forsyth, Richardson and Company. In 1821, he went into business with James Bell Forsyth to form Forsyth, Walker and Company, associated with the Montreal company. The company operated until 1836, working in shipping, insurance, real estate speculation and acting as the exclusive agent of the East India Company.

He was named an administrator of the Quebec City Trinity House in 1824 and was deputy master in 1827. He was president of the Chamber of Commerce of Quebec City from 1841 to 1848. In 1849 and 1850 he was president of the Quebec City branch of the Bank of Montreal. He also headed two insurance companies, a natural gas company, and a railroad. He was chancellor of Bishop's College in Lennoxville, Quebec.

From 1838 to 1841, he participate in the first and third sessions of the Special Council of Lower Canada. In 1842 he was appointed to the Legislative Council of the Province of Canada and remained a member until his death.

He was the brother-in-law of Edward Greive.
