= Beaver Club =

Former social club in Montreal, Canada

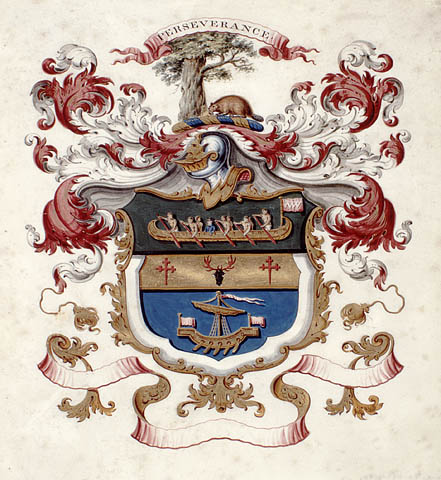
Arms of the North West Company

The Beaver Club was a gentleman's club founded in Montreal in 1785 by British Canadians engaged in the North American fur trade. According to the club's rules, the object of their meeting was "to bring together, at stated periods during the winter season, a set of men highly respectable in society, who had passed their best days in a savage country and had encountered the difficulties and dangers incident to a pursuit of the fur trade of Canada". Only fragmentary records remain of their meetings, but from these it is clear that the Beaver Club was "an animated expression of the esprit de corps of the North West Company". The men of the Beaver Club were the predecessors of Montreal's Square Milers.

== Origins ==
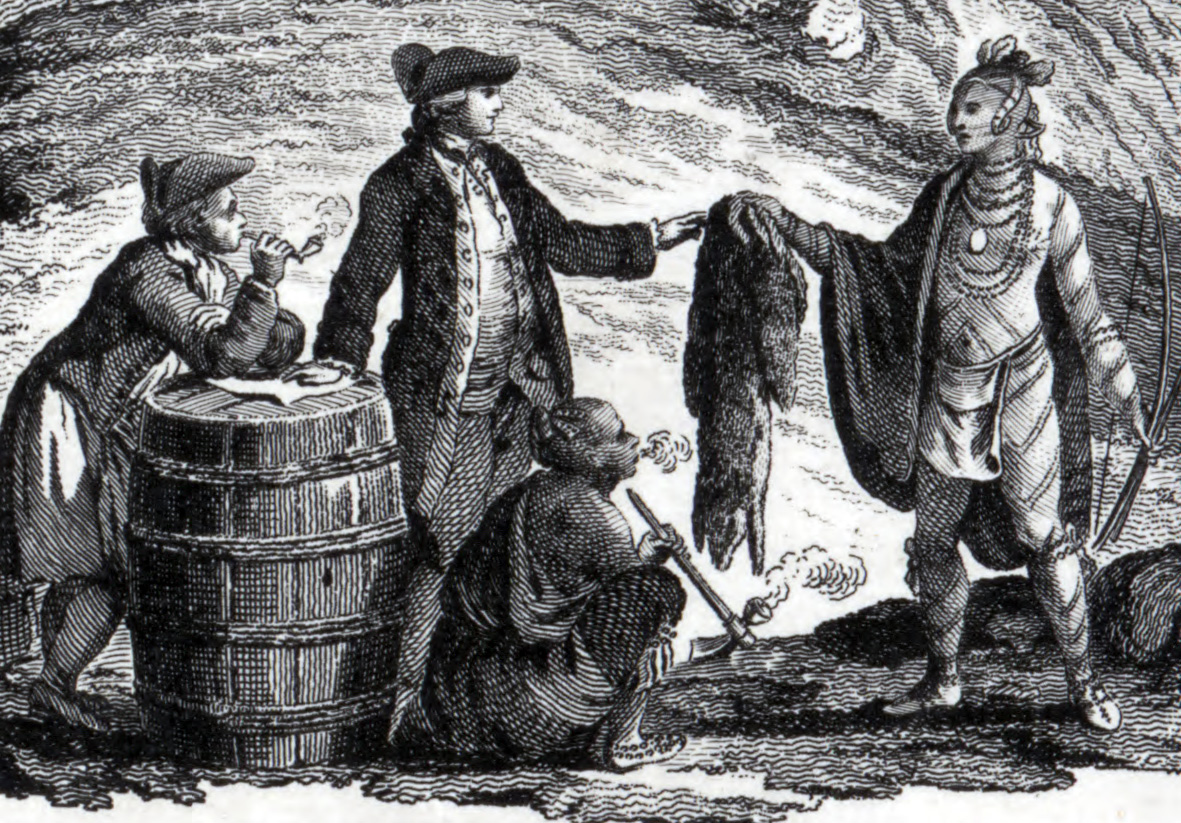
A Canadian fur trader in 1777. Cartouche from William Faden, "A map of the Inhabited Part of Canada from the French Surveys; with the Frontiers of New York and New England", 1777

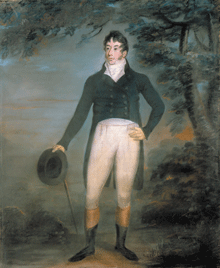
John MacDonald of Garth

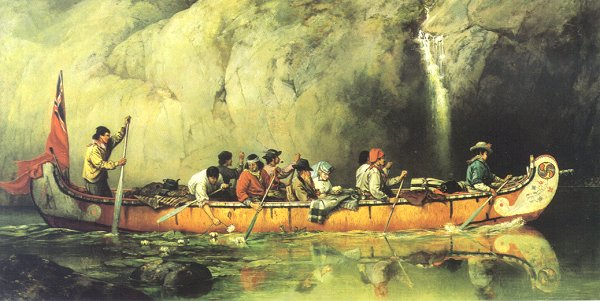
A canoe of the rival Hudson's Bay Company in 1869, carrying the artist, Frances Anne Hopkins, and her husband, Edward Hopkins, secretary to the Governor of the Hudson's Bay Company, in similar style as to the partners of the North West Company

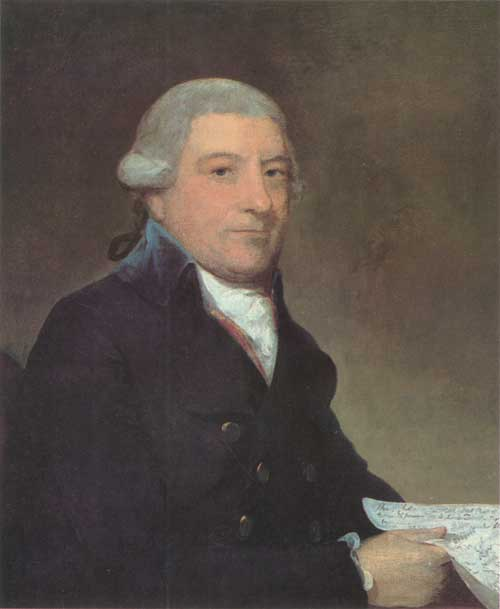
Alexander Henry (1739–1824), vice-chairman of the Beaver Club, published his account of living with the Ojibwa and subsequent explorations (1760-76) before becoming a partner of the North West Company. He introduced John Jacob Astor to the Club and the fur trade at Montreal

In 18th century North America, the fur 'barons' of Montreal might only have been compared to the tobacco 'lords' of Virginia for their wealth and grand style of living. The members of the Beaver Club were bon vivants, renowned for the Scottish Highland hospitality they offered to their guests and for the jovial, rollicking behaviour that carried on at their meetings. In his entertaining book The Shoe and Canoe, the English geologist, John Bigsby, relates the character of these Montreal fur traders in their early days:

A number of young men, chiefly of good Scotch families, able, daring, and somewhat reckless perhaps (a typical example being John MacDonald of Garth), formed themselves into a company (the North West Company) in order to traffic in the forbidden land (owned by the Hudson's Bay Company) in spite of the charter.

A first-rate Indian trader is no ordinary man. He is a soldier-merchant, and unites the gallantry of the one with the shrewdness of the other. Montreal was then the best place for seeing this class of persons.. They spend fast, play all the freaks, pranks, and street-fooleries, and originate all the current whimsicalities: but this is their brief holiday: when they turn their faces westward, up stream, their manners change.

The Indian Trader is a bold, square-chested, gaunt man, sun-burnt, with extraordinary long hair as a defence against mosquitoes. He is equally at home on horseback or in the canoe - indefatigable when needful, careless of heat and cold, and brave as steel, as though he bore a charmed life, in countries where the Queen's writ scarcely runs, where the law only of personal authority takes effect. Often he has not only to contend with the Indians, and to right himself on the spot with other traders, but he has to fight his own men hand to hand. Kindness, vigour, and sagacity, usually render but one such affair necessary.

In 1786, controlled by Simon McTavish and the Frobishers, there were 28 chief partners of the North West Company and their business was conducted by an army of about 2,000 men, not including the native Indians. That year they exported furs to the value of £203,378: 116,623 beaver skins and 473,534 other pelts. As profits continued to soar, the chief partners of the North West Company retired from their expeditions into the wilderness to conduct their business with London and Paris from Montreal. Conducting themselves in suitable style, two or three of the chief partners would venture forth from Montreal to the annual meeting with the 'wintering (junior) partners' on the ground at Grand Portage (in what is now Minnesota) and Fort William (in what is now Ontario).

At Lachine, the Montreal partners boarded their immense canoes manned by voyageurs and hunters in Buckskins with bright silk bands around their heads and neck. The voyageurs were the most experienced canoe-men and wilderness travelers in the world, and the partners took a high pride in the skill of their hardy henchmen, giving each on their arrival a régale, which meant a gallon of rum. The partners took their seats conspicuously dressed in ruffles and gold braid, with brass-handled pistols and daggers at their belts. In 1894, Brian Hughes recalled his grandfather (James Hughes, admitted a member of the club in 1813) recounting his memories of these partners journeying into the wilds:

They traversed the rivers in great state, like sovereigns making a progress. They were wrapped in rich furs, their huge canoes freighted with every convenience and luxury and manned by Canadian voyageurs as loyal and as obedient as their own ancestral clansmen. They carried with them cooks and bakers, together with delicacies of every kind, and an abundance of choice wine for the banquets.

The men of the Beaver Club had a great reputation for hospitality and generosity, which led to many of them frittering away their fortunes. One such example was Nicholas Montour, who retired as a partner of the North West Company in 1792 with a fortune of £20,000. He purchased a seigneury, that ought to have furthered his fortune, but not before too long his style of living coupled with a free and generous disposition to his guests left him with nothing other than his manor house. In 1808, John Lambert recalled in reference to Montour:

This too often happens with the gentlemen of the North-west company who retire from the concern. They emerge suddenly into civilized life after a banishment of many years in dreary forests and among a race of savages; and are apt to be dazzled by the glare of refinement and luxury, whose temptations are too powerful to be resisted. Hence they are frequently led into error and extravagance, which ultimately despoil them of their hard-earned property.

== Traditions ==
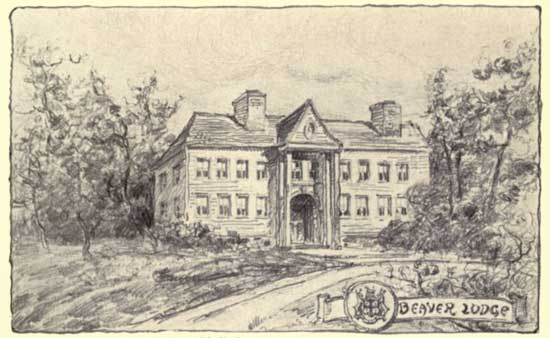
Beaver Hall, the home of Joseph Frobisher. Built in 1792, the dining room comfortably sat 40 guests.

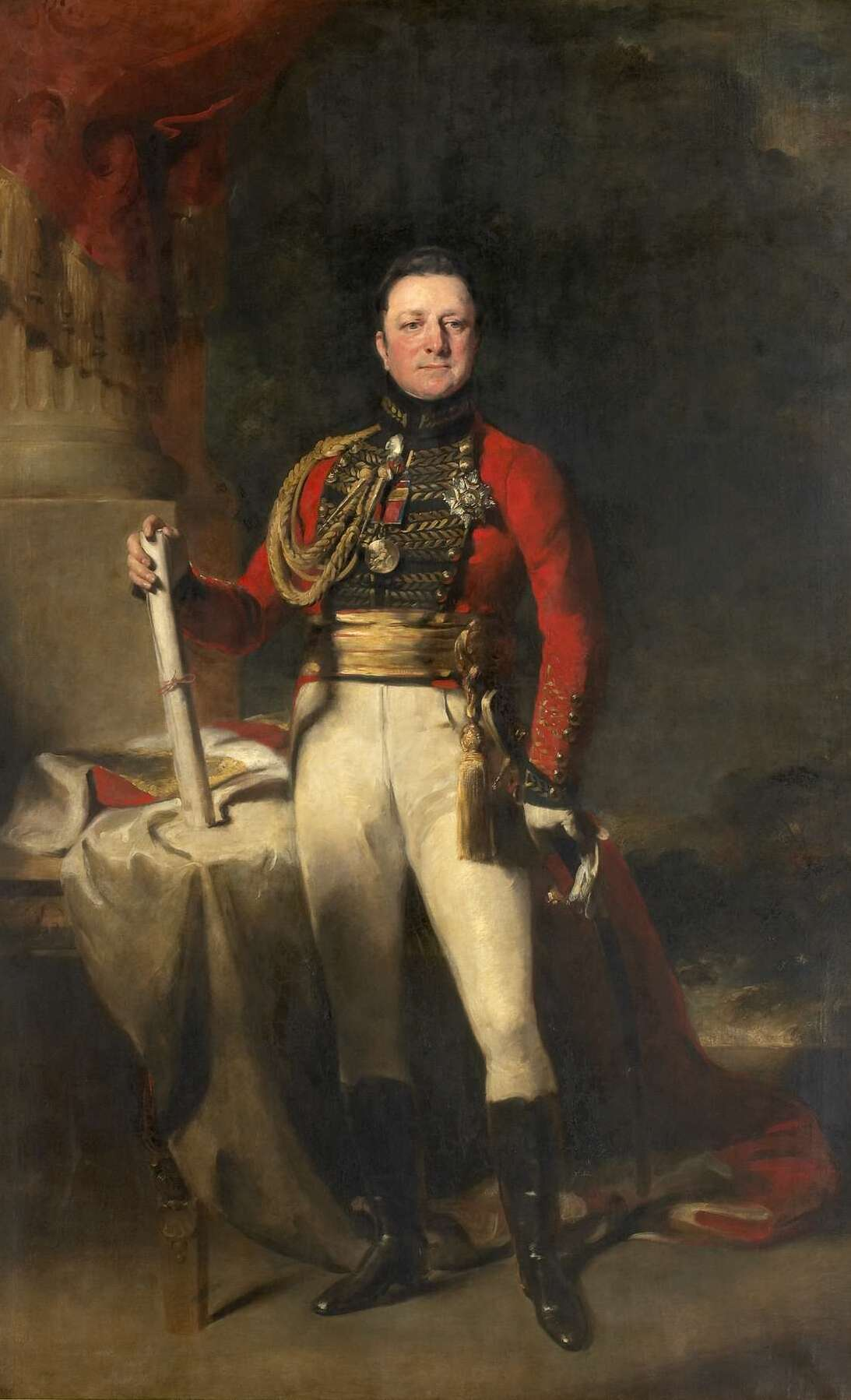
In 1824, Lord Dalhousie wrote in his diary: "Upon the whole I don't recollect having ever spent a more pleasant or more interesting day than that with the Beaver Club"

At first, the nineteen incorporators of the Beaver Club maintained a rigid exclusiveness over its membership, but later their ranks were opened and the limit of membership was placed at fifty-five with ten honorary places. At the regular gatherings an opportunity was offered of introducing into society such traders as might from time to time return from the Indian country. Potential members were selected by ballot on the basis of their standing and character and then invited as a guest to one of the gatherings. Following the dinner, a vote was taken and only if approved of unanimously would they then be invited to join the Club. The vast majority of them were Highland Scots, but they were joined by French Canadians (the five most senior of the original members had been French Canadian), Englishmen, Irishmen and Loyalists, all "thoroughly cosmopolitan by taste and association".

The first dinner of their season was held on the first Wednesday in December. Following that fortnightly meetings were held until April between private houses (notably at Beaver Hall, the home of Joseph Frobisher, whose dining table comfortably sat forty guests) and at various hotels and taverns in Montreal. These included the Mansion House Hotel and the City Tavern, both on Rue Saint-Paul; Richard Dillon's Montreal Hotel on the Place d'Armes; Palmer's Hummums and Tesseyman's.

Records are scant, but the guests known to have attended included Lord Selkirk, General Sir Gordon Drummond, General Sir Isaac Brock, Washington Irving, General Sir Roger Sheaffe, Sir John Franklin, Thomas Moore, John Jacob Astor and Lord Dalhousie. The last named recorded in his diary: "Upon the whole I don't recollect having ever spent a more pleasant or more interesting day than that with the Beaver Club". In gratitude to member James Hughes, with whom he was staying with in Montreal, Dalhousie gave him a silver snuff box with gold trim, bearing the inscription: "The Earl of Dalhousie to James Hughes, Esq., in remembrance of the Beaver Club, May 24, 1824".

The dinners commenced at 4:00 in the afternoon. Members arrived richly adorned in ruffles and a profusion of gold lace with knee-breeches above their gold-clasped garters and silver-buckled shoes. But, most importantly they wore the club's large gold medal with the inscription "Fortitude in Distress", that hung from a light blue ribbon around their necks.

The start of the festivities were marked by the passing around of a calumet, followed by a speech or 'harangue' made by the evening's president. Toasts were then made, and there were always five to: The Mother of all Saints; the King; the fur trade in all its branches; voyageurs, wives and children; and absent members. Then, accompanied by Highland Pipers, on a dais of red velvet a flaming boar's head was brought into the dining room, a piece of camphor having been placed in its mouth before the grand entrance. The members and their guests were then permitted to pursue their own pleasures.

Seated around a great mahogany table, servants plied the members in regular relays with luxuries from the east and the west, and costly delicacies from across the sea. The menu included country food such as Pemmican (brought from Saskatchewan), braised venison, bread sauce, "Chevreuil des Guides" (a stew), venison sausages, wild rice, quail and partridge "du Vieux Trappeur"; fish from the Great Lakes, pickled turnips, "Sweet Peace" applesauce, Atholl Brose, bear meat, buffalo tongue and bag pudding (which might have been Figgy duff). This country food was served among the unfamiliar atmosphere of mahogany, crystal glass, crested silverware and soft candle glow. John Bigsby was told, that "on certain great occasions the last plate put on the table before each member held a cheque for a sum of money".

After dinner, any previous formalities were laid aside as the men started to sing old voyageur songs and exchange tales about their perilous adventures in the old fur trading days. The festivities often ran into the early hours of the morning with the members dancing on the tables, re-enacting various canoeing adventures and breaking numerous bottles, plates, glasses and chairs in the process. There were many stories of the members arranging themselves on the floor in a row as if they were in a great canoe, imitating vigorous paddling (using fire pokers, swords, walking sticks etc., for paddles) and mounting wine barrels to "shoot the rapids" from the table to the floor. At one such dinner, twenty members (including Sir Alexander Mackenzie and William McGillivray) were still singing and dancing at 4am, and close to 120 bottles of wine were either drunk, broken or spilled that night.

== Dinner Bill ==
On 17 September 1808, nineteen members met at Richard Dillon's Montreal Hotel on the Place d'Armes. Those present were: Joseph Frobisher (presiding); Alexander Henry the elder (vice-chairman); William McKay (the 'cork'); Alexander McKay; William McGillivray; James McGill; Isaac Todd; Josiah Bleakley; John Gregory; George Gillespie; Roderick Mackenzie of Terrebonne; Thomas Thain; General Sir Gordon Drummond; Sir John Johnson; Sir Roger Sheaffe; John MacDonald of Garth; Archibald Norman McLeod; Alexander McKenzie (cousin of Sir Alexander Mackenzie); and John Jacob Astor.

The bill for this meeting was: 32 dinners (£12); 29 bottles of Madeira (6/); 19 bottles of Port (5/); 14 bottles of Porter (2/6); 12 quarts of Ale (8/); 7 suppers (8/9); Brandy and Gin (2/6); Cigars, pipes, tobacco (5/); Three wine glasses broken (3/9). Total: £28.15/.

== Members ==
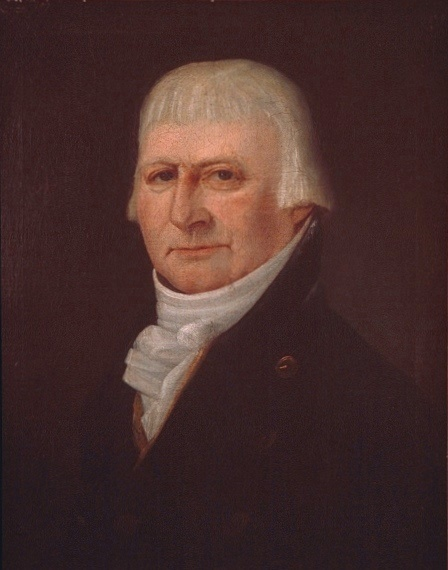
Joseph Frobisher was the enthusiastic founding chairman of the Beaver Club

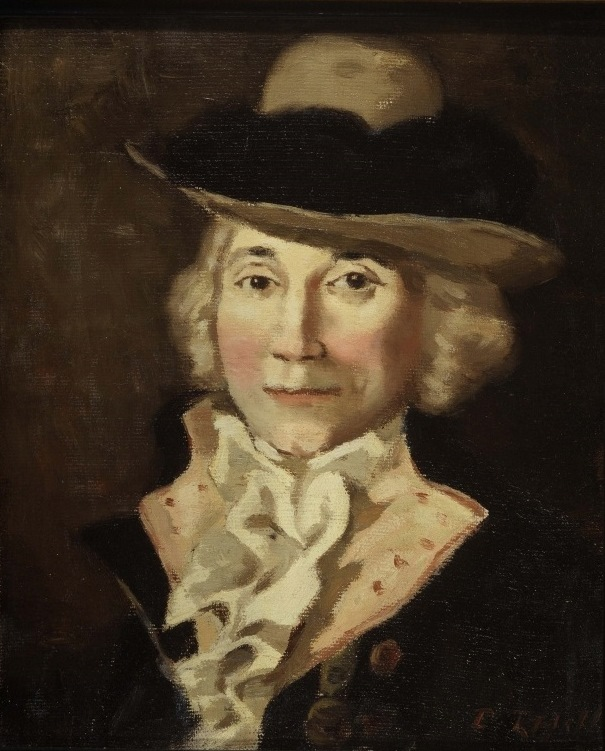
Charles Chaboillez, the club's most senior founding member, was perhaps the most influential French Canadian fur trader following the British Conquest

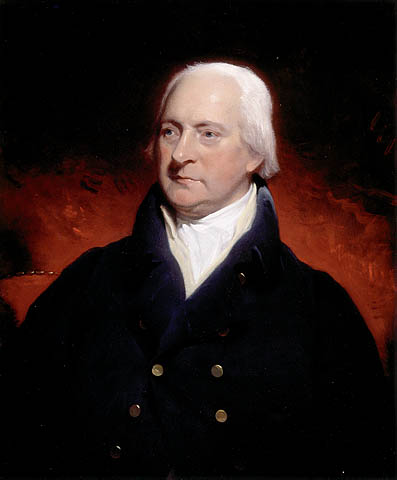
Simon McTavish, the undisputed leader of the North West Company known for his generosity and refined style of living, was admitted into the Beaver Club in 1792

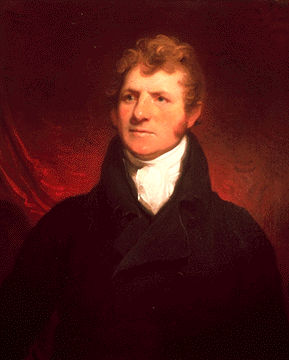
William McGillivray co-founded the Canada Club in London where meetings were reminiscent of the old Club

All the names below appeared in Rules and Regulations of the Beaver Club, 1819, when only one of the original members was still alive. The nineteen original members were ranked in seniority by the date on which they had first entered the interior of Canada. As such, the French Canadian fur traders who had remained in the business after the British Conquest of New France held the most senior rank. In that order, with the dates in brackets of their first adventures into the Canadian wilderness, the original nineteen members were:

- Charles Chaboillez (1751)
- Maurice-Régis Blondeau (1752)
- Hypolitte Desrivieres (1753)
- Etienne-Charles Campion (1753)
- Gabriel Cotte (1760)
- Alexander Henry the elder (1761)
- Joseph-Louis Ainsse (1762)
- Benjamin Frobisher (1765)
- James McGill (1766)
- George McBeath (1766)
- James Finlay (1766)
- Joseph Frobisher (1768)
- John McGill (1770)
- Peter Pond (1770)
- Matthew Lessey (1770)
- David McCrae (1772)
- John McNamara (1772)
- Thomas Frobisher (1773)
- Jean-Baptiste Jobert (1775)

New members were elected almost every year from 1787, though the dates of their first voyages into the interior were not always recorded. The list below shows new members inducted by year, and if known the year of their first voyage in brackets:

- 1787: Jean-Baptiste Tabean (1770) Josiah Bleakley.
- 1789: Patrick Small (nephew of Major-General John Small)
- 1790: Nicholas Montour (1767); Venant St. Germain; Leon St. Germain; Joseph Howard.
- 1791: John Gregory; Andrew Todd; Jacques Giasson.
- 1792: Simon McTavish.
- 1793: Myer Michaels; James Grant.
- 1795: Isaac Todd; William McGillivray; Sir Alexander Mackenzie.
- 1796: Angus Shaw; Roderick Mackenzie of Terrebonne.
- 1799: Duncan McGillivray; George Gillespie.
- 1801: Jacques Porlier.
- 1802: Alexander Cuthbert.
- 1803: Alexander Fraser; Simon Fraser.
- 1807: Dr. David Mitchell, Sr.; Thomas Thain; Lewis Crawford; David Mitchell, Jr., the younger; Peter Grant; Alex McDougall; Pierre de Rastel de Rocheblave (1793); John Forsyth; John Richardson; John Finlay; Aeneas Cameron; William McKay.
- 1808: Sir John Johnson; John MacDonald of Garth; Archibald Norman McLeod; Alexander Mackenzie (1783).
- 1809: John Wills; Charles Chaboillez, younger; Alexander McKay.
- 1810: John Sayer.
- 1813: James Hughes; Kenneth McKenzie.
- 1814: Archibald McLellan (who won an award for bravery); George Moffat; W. McRae; Henry McKenzie.
- 1815: Jasper Tough; J.M. Lamothe (1799); F.A. LaRocque; Thomas McMurray; Robert Henry; Peter Warren Dease; Charles Grant.
- 1816: David Stuart.
- 1817: William Henry; Jacob Franks (1799); David David (1807); John McLaughlin (1807); Hugh McGillis; John McDonald; Allan McDonell; James Grant; John Siveright (1799); John George MacTavish.
- 1818: Simon McGillivray; Angus Bethune; Jules-Maurice Quesnel; John McGillivray; James Leith.
- 1820: Sir George Simpson.

Finally, there were eleven honorary members, many of whom were the captains of the ships who transported their furs back to England. They could only attend at meetings held especially for them in the summer months. The dates in brackets show the year of their admission:

Captain Featonby of the Eweretta (1789); Captain Gibson of the Integrity (1789); Monsieur le Compte Andriani, of Milan (1791); Captain Edwards of the Indian Trader (1792); Colonel Daniel Robertson, of Struan (1793); Major-General Sir John Doyle (1796); Captain Edward Boyd of the Montreal (1800); Captain Alexander Patterson of the Eweretta (1800); Major George Clerk, of the 49th Regiment (1807); Lord Viscount Chabot (1808), Quartermaster General of Canada; Captain Sarmon of the Mary (1808).

== Decline ==
As trading posts were built it had become less dangerous to travel in the wilderness, and without competitors' territories to invade, the early spirit of adventure had disappeared from newcomers to the fur trade. By 1809, the seventy-year-old Alexander Henry hinted at a segregation between the young and old members in a letter to John Askin: "There is only us four old friends (himself, James McGill, Isaac Todd and Joseph Frobisher) alive, all the new North westards are a parcel of Boys and upstarts, who were not born in our time, and supposes they know much more of the Indian trade than any before them".

The club continued to meet until 1804, and there was a resurgence of interest between 1807 and 1824, but when Sir George Simpson tried to revive its traditions in 1827 it was doomed to failure – the spirit enjoyed by the earlier traders had gone. However, several members, such as Angus Shaw, Robert Dickson, William McGillivray and John Forsyth became members of the smaller Canada Club in London (founded in 1810, and still extant), where meetings in the 1830s were reminiscent of the old Beaver Club.

== See also ==
- North West Company
- Golden Square Mile
- Canadian peers and baronets
- Gentlemen's club
