= Charles Chaboillez =

French Canadian fur trader

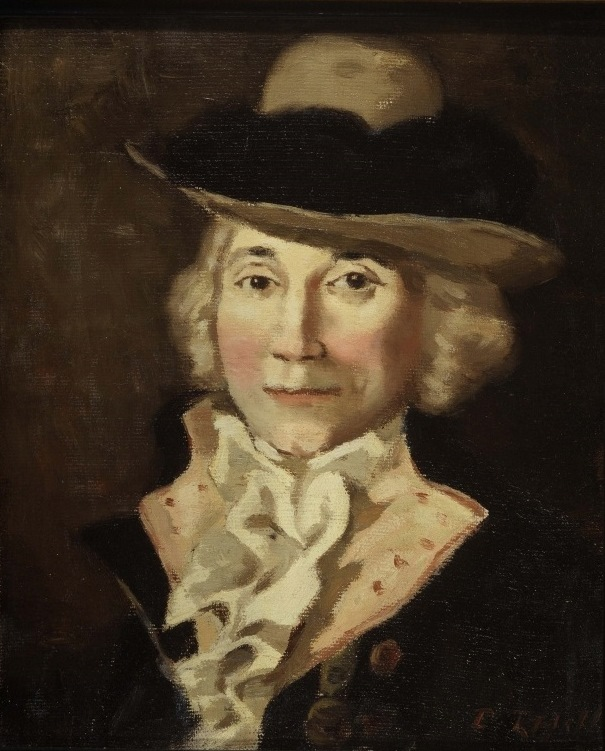
- Born: 9 July 1736; Michilimackinac
- Died: 25 September 1808 (aged 72); Montreal, Quebec
- Known for: French Canadian fur trader, founding member of the Beaver Club at Montreal

Charles-Jean-Baptiste Chaboillez (July 9, 1736 – September 25, 1808), of Montreal, was one of the most influential French Canadian fur traders after the British Conquest of New France and a founding member of the Beaver Club. Chaboillez Square in Montreal was named for his nephew, The Hon. Louis Chaboillez, in 1813.

== Early life ==
He was the eldest son of fur trader Charles Chaboillez (1706-1757), and his wife Marie-Anne (1711-1778), the daughter of another well-known fur trader, Jean-Baptiste Chevalier (1677-1746). After his father's death, his mother returned to Montreal and purchased a spacious house on Rue Saint-Paul for 9,000 livres. From 1751, Chaboillez with his brothers was active in the fur trade between Michilimackinac, Grand Portage and Montreal. By 1769, he had already amassed a personal fortune of some 30,000 livres and the following year an investment of £2,550 in the fur trade put him in the forefront of Canadian investors.

== Fur Trade ==
Chaboillez was a client of Montreal merchant Jean Orillat and he was supplied from Michilimackinac by John Askin. He maintained business relations with Benjamin Frobisher, who went surety for him in 1778 and again in 1783. That year, Frobisher and Chaboillez guaranteed an expedition costing £3,500 which Benjamin and his brother Joseph Frobisher sent to Grand Portage. In 1785, he went into partnership with other Montreal outfitters and merchants at Michilimackinac, one being Étienne-Charles Campion, to form the General Company of Lake Superior and the South. The objective of the 'General Society', was to engage in the fur trade in the Mississippi region for a period of three years. In 1786, Chaboillez joined with McTavish, the Frobisher brothers, James McGill and others merchants to ask Sir John Johnson to establish peace among the Indian tribes in the upper Mississippi region. During the winter of 1792–93 Chaboillez was in partnership with George Edme Young, and they engaged 42 men to go to Michilimackinac and the Mississippi.

== Farming and Militia ==
Chaboillez acquired several farms around Montreal, including one on the Côte de Liesse on Montreal Island and another on the Seigneury of Châteauguay, both purchased in 1779. In 1788, he was in possession of three islands on the Hochelaga Archipelago, including Île à l'Aigle, which he turned into a livestock farm. He was churchwarden of the parish of Sainte-Anne-de-Michillimakinac and was appointed Captain in Montreal's 2nd Militia Battalion and in 1799 he was promoted major, retiring in 1802.

== Final Years ==
Chaboillez had held an important place in the Canadian fur trade. In 1778, John Askin wrote to Benjamin Frobisher commenting on him: "I know no person so well off in the North Trade as he is." In 1802, he was appointed storekeeper for the Indian Department at St. Joseph Island in Upper Canada. He returned to Montreal in 1807, where he died the following year, however, his fortune had vanished. His business hit serious difficulties in the 1790s from which he never recovered, and at his death he was heavily in debt by many thousands. Much of his debt (some £5,000) was owed to his son-in-law, Simon McTavish, who had predeceased him. By McTavish's will, all debts owed to him by Chaboillez were to be cancelled and McTavish's generosity had then gone one step further by providing his father-in-law with an annuity of £150 a year.

== Family ==
In 1769, at Montreal, Chaboillez married Marguerite Larchevêque (1749-1798), daughter of merchant Jacques Larchevêque, dit La Promenade. As her dowry, his wife brought 40,000 livres in the form of a lot with house, furnishings, silverware, and cash. Mrs Chaboillez's sister, Mrs Charlotte (Larchevêque) Jobert, was the mother of Charlotte Jobert who married Joseph Frobisher of Beaver Hall. The Chaboillezs were the parents of nine children, but only five survived infancy:

- Charles Chaboillez (1772-1812), of Terrebonne, the second of four Canadiens to be made a partner in the North West Company. He married Jessy Dunbar Selby Bruyères Bruce (1792-1857), daughter of Captain John Bruce. After his death, at Montreal his widow remarried Lt.-General Sir Robert Bartley (1789-1843) K.C.B., grandfather of Sir Edmund Bartley-Denniss.
- Marie-Marguerite Chaboillez (b.1775), married (1) Simon McTavish, senior partner of the North West Company (2) William Smith Plenderleath, recognised son of General Gabriel Christie and his mistress Rachel Plenderleath.
- Adélaïde Chaboillez (1781-1847), married Joseph Bouchette, Surveyor-General of the Canadas
- Marie-Charlotte Chaboillez (1784-1805), became a nun at the Hôtel-Dieu de Montréal.
- Marie-Louise-Rachel Chaboillez (1786-1853), married The Hon. Roderick Mackenzie of Terrebonne.
