= Île-à-la-Crosse =

Île-à-la-Crosse ᓵᑭᑕᐚᕽ sâkitawâhk
- Northern village
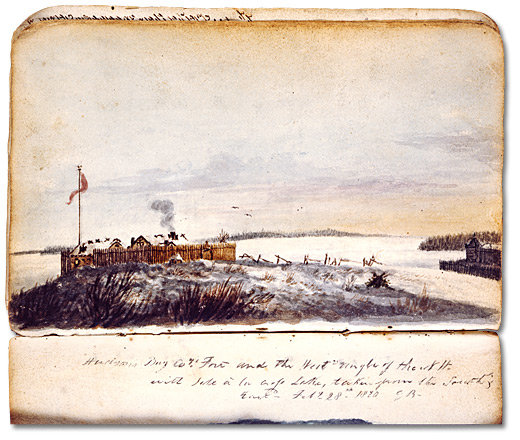
- Forts of Île-à-la-Crosse by George Back in 1820

- Location within Saskatchewan
- Coordinates: 55°28′33″N 107°55′03″W
- Country: Canada
- Province: Saskatchewan
- District: Northern Saskatchewan Administration District
- First Trading Post: 1776
- Mission founded: 1846
- Day School founded: 1847
- Boarding School founded: 1860

Government
  - Type: Municipal
  - Mayor: Duane Favel
  - Administrator: Donny Favel
  - MLA Athabasca: Leroy Laliberte
  - MP Desnethé—Missinippi—Churchill River: Buckley Belanger

Area
  - Total: 23.84 km^{2} (9.20 sq mi)

Population (2016)
  - Total: 1,296
- Metis settlement
- Time zone: UTC−06:00 (CST)
- Postal code: S0M 1C0
- Area code: 306
- Highways: Hwy 155, Hwy 908
- Waterways: Churchill River, Beaver River

National Historic Site of Canada
- Official name: Île-à-la-Crosse National Historic Site of Canada
- Designated: 1954

Île-à-la-Crosse (Plains Cree: ᓵᑭᑕᐚᕽ, romanized: sâkitawâhk) is a northern village in Division No. 18, northwestern Saskatchewan, and was the site of historic trading posts first established in 1778. Île-à-la-Crosse is the second oldest community in Saskatchewan, Canada, following establishment of the Red River Colony in 1811. It sits at the end of a 20 km (12 mi) long peninsula on the western shore of Lac Île-à-la-Crosse, and is linked with Peter Pond Lake (historically Buffalo Lake) and Churchill Lake (historically Clear Lake) through a series of interconnected lakes, rivers, and portage routes.

The Cree and Dene peoples who used these integrated passages of water named the respective mass of water and their community Sakitawak. This Cree name means “big opening where the waters meet.” The surrounding network of lakes were traditionally referred to as the headwaters of Missinipe, renamed in the fur trade era to English River, and currently identified as Churchill River. Île-à-la-Crosse occupies a central location in the Canadian subarctic region, positioned along the southern entryway to the Methye Portage which is a continental divide where waters flow to both the Arctic Ocean and the Hudson Bay.

Île-à-la-Crosse is of exceptional historical note, given its prime access to trading posts located further within the North-Western Territory, which in turn promoted significant interest from both Catholic missionaries and fur trading companies.

== History ==
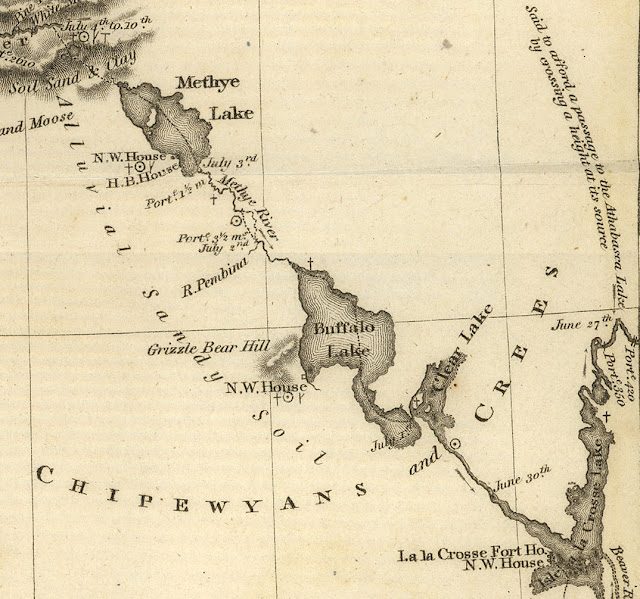
John Franklin's Coppermine Expedition map of 1819–1822 showing the fur trade route from Île-à-la-Crosse to Methye Portage

Historically, the area around Sakitawak acted as a border land between the territories of the Cree and Dene peoples. The positioning of Île-à-la-Crosse at the entryway to the English River District encouraged increasingly interdependent economic, social, and political activity. This strategic position helped establish the community as a meeting place that promoted the cultural and socio-economic exchanges of the Cree, Dene, Scots, English, French, and Metis peoples.

=== Fur trade ===
The intensely competitive fur trade shaped the community of Île-à-la-Crosse through the familial and business relationships formed between Indigenous inhabitants and European traders and created a district Métis community within northern Saskatchewan. Traders following depleting resources moved across the Plains northward and westward which made Île-à-la-Crosse a central place to organize trading from the Northern Plains into a larger global trade of furs and goods.

==== Early trading ====
In 1775, Thomas Frobisher joined a Dene hunting group to northern hunting territory; his expedition attempted to establish a passage from Lake Athabasca to the Arctic Ocean. While unsuccessful in his mission he visited Île-à-la-Crosse, where he realized accessibility to routes further north through the Athabasca River and east through the English River to Hudson Bay. He built the first trading post during the winter of 1776. The following year, Thomas and Joseph Frobisher commissioned Peter Pond to chart a route from the post to Athabasca. In doing so, Pond helped establish a practice making Île-à-la-Crosse the central passageway and resting spot for those moving through the North-Western Territory. His trip was still used a century later by voyageurs going to the Methye Portage. The area's name of English River District was after Thomas Frobisher as the first English speaker in the region. Frobisher's success attracted the attention of the independent voyageurs from Montreal who would later join with the Frobisher brothers and Alexander Henry the Elder, to form the North West Company in 1783. The next year, the North West Company hired Patrick Small as the first trader at the post year-round, showing the significance of the village in handling administration for the larger district.

The next post built was in 1785 by another group out of Montreal under the control of Alexander Mackenzie. Competition caused spurs of violence in the region over the control of economic resources, escalating with the arrival of Hudson's Bay Company. The late beginnings of Hudson's Bay Company in the North-Western Territory was due to a shortage of available voyageurs and the domination of the North West Company. It was not until 1791 a post was established and was operational year-round in 1799. The North West Company continued to rise to power up until the point of their merger with the Hudson's Bay Company in 1821.

==== English River District ====
The 1821 Hudson's Bay Company merger made the trade post at Île-à-la-Crosse the administrative centre of the English River District. The administrative responsibilities ensured the surrounding outposts were given necessary provisioning and that its northern and southern entries remained accessible. The delegation as administrative centre positioned the post as a point of contact for the surrounding trading posts and would attract attention from missionaries. The centrality allowed for a concentration of social and economic relations creating conditions to become a Métis homeland because of the direct involvement of and relationality held by the children descending from Cree and Dene women and men of the fur trade. Due to the detailed administrative record keeping of both by officials in the area the growing Métis population was documented through a series of record-keeping instruments and distinguished the Métis of northwest Saskatchewan from those in the Red River Colony.

Starting after the establishment of the headquarters, the Hudson's Bay Company began trying to reduce the number of people posted to limit the amount of responsibility to support the trade families. This effort was never successful and the continuing presence of the Métis demonstrates their failure to do so. By 1856, the English River District encompassed trading posts in Green Lake, Rapid River, Portage La Loche, Cold Lake and Deer Lake on Reindeer Lake, however in the decades that followed many of these posts were no longer functioning because of settler encroachment, the sale of Rupert's Land, and the westward buffalo migration.

=== Catholic missionaries ===
In 1845, Chief Factor Roderick McKenzie wrote to Bishop Joseph-Norbert Provencher to request the establishment of a mission at Île-à-la-Crosse. The same year, Provencher received another letter from Jean-Baptiste Thibault, who perceived that it was urgent for the Catholic Church to send missionaries to Île-à-la-Crosse because of the eagerness of the Métis to convert and the imminent competition with Protestants. The Hudson’s Bay Company controlled the region outside the Red River Colony, known as the North-Western Territory or Rupert's Land, through strict management of transportation systems leading to their established trading posts. This gave the company implicit control to confine missionary activities to the Red River Colony]. The ban remained in place until the decision by George Simpson, the governor of the Hudson's Bay Company, granted missionaries access prompting the Catholic mission network to extend into the North-Western Territory.

==== Saint-Jean-Baptiste Mission ====
In the context of expansion, the requests for a mission made by Chief Factor and Thibault were met in 1845 when the Oblate General Administration allowed the establishment of a mission presence in Île-à-la-Crosse. Joseph-Bruno Guigues, the superior Oblate General, chose the Fathers, Alexandre-Antonin Taché and Louis-François Richer Laflèche to set up the foundation for the mission. Taché and Laflèche arrived in September 1846, the pair were given a cabin left abandoned by the North West Company and began holding ceremonies the following spring. They operated the Saint-Jean-Baptiste Mission out of the single room cabin that functioned as both a dormitory and a mission . Later in 1848, a third Oblate Henri Faraud was sent to aid in the refurbishing of the cabin. The creation of the Saint-Jean-Baptiste Mission functioned primarily to initiate the establishment of satellite missions. This process was done through the extensive travel of Father Taché who made regular visits to Green Lake, Reindeer Lake, Portage La Loche, and Fort Chipewyan.

The missionary expansion throughout the North-Western Territory necessitated permanent funding separate from that paid to Bishop Provencher. The financial independence gave the responsibility to Saint-Jean-Baptiste Mission as the administrative base for the entirety of the North-West Territory. Furthermore, Alexandre-Antonin Taché became the first Oblate superior of Rupert`s Land and the North-Western Territory. In order to manage the increasing workload of both running the mission in Île-à-la-Crosse and satellite missions, four more Oblates were sent. Henri Grollier arriving in 1852 and sent to Fort Chipewyan and Fond-du-Lac, Valentin Végréville arriving in 1853 to establish a mission at Cold Lake, René Rémas arriving the same year sent to set up the Lac La Biche Mission, and finally Vital-Justin Grandin arriving in 1855 for the purpose of helping Henri Faraud and Henri Grollier. More assistance was given by selected lay brothers with the first being Louis Dubé followed by Patrick Bowes and Louis Boisramé who were able to construct a residence for missionaries. The Oblates enlisted the help of the Grey Nuns (Sisters of Charity of Montreal) to cope under the mounting pressure to operate facilities at the Saint-Jean-Baptiste mission, extending influence to satellite missions, and supplying resources to surrounding missions.

By 1860, Saint-Jean Baptiste began to act as resource depot administering food, clothing, and other items to surrounding posts. Saint-Jean-Baptiste also became a transshipment point for both manufactured goods and religious items sent from the Red River Colony and a conduit for communication into the disparate missions in the North. This continued until reoccurring fires and misfortunes struck the mission in 1867, depleting the mission of necessary resources needed to fulfill its administrative duties.

==== Le Couvent Saint-Bruno ====
The Sisters of Charity of Montreal, known as the Grey Nuns, arrived at Île-à-la-Crosse on October 4, 1860. Three sisters were sent after the Oblates request for assistance, including Sister Agnès (born Marie-Rose Caron), Sister Philomène Boucher, and Sister Pepin (born Marie-Anne Lachance). The name Saint Bruno Convent was given a few days after their arrival with a blessed day of feast for Saint-Bruno. The mission had started the operation of a day school in 1847, however, the school had poor and irregular attendance and encouraged the enlistment of the Grey Nuns to establish a boarding school. On November 25, 1860, the Sisters of Charity established the boarding school located within the Saint Bruno Convent that served to both educate and provide medical services.

A fire engulfed the building March 1, 1867, after which the entirety of the infrastructure was lost and needed to be rebuilt. In 1874, a new school building was constructed and named Notre-Dame du Sacré Cœur The Sisters of Charity would eventually temporarily relocate and return in 1917, to establish another school called the School of the Holy Family.

== Demographics ==
In the 2021 Census of Population conducted by Statistics Canada, Île-à-la-Crosse had a population of 1,425 living in 445 of its 496 total private dwellings, a change of 10% from its 2016 population of 1,296. With a land area of 23.3 km^{2} (9.0 sq mi), it had a population density of 61.2/km^{2} (158.4/sq mi) in 2021.

In the 2016 census, 985 or 77% of respondents self identified as being Métis peoples with another 18% identifying as First Nations, and 1.2% who identified as having Multiple Aboriginal responses. Within the northern village, 98.4% of residents are English speakers only, 18% speak Indigenous languages, most prominently 18% of those are speakers of Algonquian languages, and 7.4% identify as being Michif speakers.

The remote location of the northern village causes the population to be seasonally variant and many are drawn outside of the community for employment. It is therefore relevant to consider the number private dwellings occupied by usual residents to obtain an understanding of the size of the community, these numbers are 406, 425, and 408 for 2016, 2011, and 2006 respectively.

Canada census – Île-à-la-Crosse community profile

	2016	2011
Population	1,296 (-5.1% from 2011)	1,365 (+1.8% from 2006)
Land area	23.84 km^{2} (9.20 sq mi)	23.84 km^{2} (9.20 sq mi)
Population density	54.4/km^{2} (141/sq mi)	57.3/km^{2} (148/sq mi)
Median age	29.0 (M: 28.2, F: 29.9)	27.4 (M: 26.9, F: 27.9)
Private dwellings	450 (total)	443 (total)
Median household income	$63,232

References: 2016 2011

== Language ==
=== Northern Michif ===
The language spoken by those from Île-à-la-Crosse is distinct in its roots and is centred in the language of Northern Plains Cree with borrowing from mission and Métis French. Rather than a perfectly mixed language, the dialect of Michif spoken in northern Saskatchewan relies heavily on Plains Cree origins because of the wide spread knowledge of the Cree language compared to French. The language was developed as a means of communicating throughout the communities located in-between Île-à-la-Crosse, Green Lake, and Buffalo Narrows.

Historically the language has been referred to as Cree without distinction from the language it derived from, however, in recent decades the language has been acknowledged as being a variant of Michif. Modern speakers of Northern Michif have taken to substituting English words for those historically substituted with French because of the majority English speaking population.

== Education ==
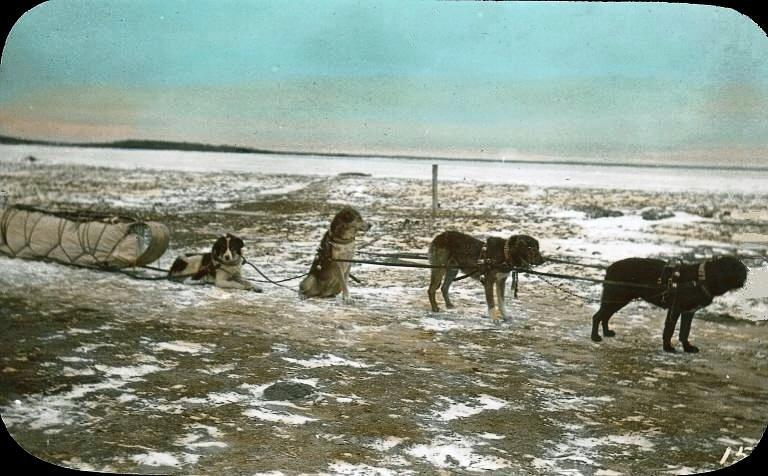
Dog team and sled, Ile-à-la-Crosse, SK, about 1910

=== Boarding school (1860–1972) ===
Enrollment in the boarding school run by the Sisters of Charity began with nine girls and six boys in 1860, which increased to seventeen students in 1862, nineteen in 1863, twenty-two in 1864, twenty-eight in 1865, and thirty in 1866. In the beginning years, complaints surfaced that the children were not progressing in developing their language skills and instead persisted in speaking the Cree language. The school was known to suffer from health issues and food shortages, that Oblates blamed on the absence of federal funding. After the 1867 fire burned the boys dormitory the school closed until 1874.

While parents were concerned with negligence and harsh treatment of children, Sara Riel, a Grey Nun involved in the school, wrote to her brother Louis Riel that she felt parents were not appreciative of the teaching services especially language training. English lessons were dropped from curriculum in 1876. The school temporarily was relocated to the Beauval Indian Residential School at Lac la Plonge, but returned in 1917 when the Grey Nuns renamed the operation the School of the Holy Family. Fires subsequently occurred in both 1920 and 1921. However, instruction continued in the following years. In 1929, registration at the School of the Holy Family rose to forty-two.

A provincial report released in 1944 on the state of education in northern Saskatchewan, called for the reorganization of students into more day schools with establishing two new large boarding schools. Neither proposal was successful, however, the Sisters of Charity did open a school in a larger building by 1946. More fires in 1964 and again in 1972 eventually lead to the complete closure of the church-run schools that were replaced with the current Rossignol Elementary and Rossignol High School.

=== Contemporary schools (1972–present) ===
Île-à-la-Crosse has two schools: Rossignol Elementary Community School (Pre-K to Grade 6), designed by architect Douglas Cardinal; and Rossignol High School (Grades 7-12) located in the Île-à-la-Crosse Integrated Services Centre, a large complex which also includes a hospital, a daycare, senior's care and offices. The schools are within the Île-à-la-Crosse School Division No. 112.

== See also ==
- List of communities in Saskatchewan
- List of villages in Saskatchewan
- Île-à-la-Crosse Airport
