= Joseph Howard =

Joseph or Joe Howard may refer to:

== Entertainment ==
- Joseph E. Howard (1870–1961), American composer and vaudeville performer
- Joseph Kinsey Howard (1906–1951), American writer
- Joseph Howard (writer) (born 1957), pseudonym for American writer Paul Rudnick
- Joe Howard (actor) (born 1948), American actor
- Joseph Howard (Oz), fictional character in the TV show Oz

== Politics ==
- Joseph Howard (prime minister) (1862–1925), prime minister of Malta
- Joseph Howard (British politician) (1834–1923), English barrister and Conservative politician
- Joseph Howard (judge) (1800–1877), Justice of the Maine Supreme Judicial Court

== Sports ==
- Joseph Howard (cricketer) (1871–1951), English cricketer
- Joseph Howard (golfer) (1878-1908), American golfer
- Joe Howard (sledge hockey) (born 1966), American ice sledge hockey player

== Other ==
- Joseph Howard (fur trader) (died 1797), merchant from Montreal
- Joseph C. Howard Sr. (1922–2000), American judge for the US Court for the District of Maryland
- Joseph H. Howard (1912–1994), oral surgeon and drum collector
- Joseph Jackson Howard (1827–1902), English genealogist
- Joe Howard Jr. (1833–1908), American journalist
