= Frobisher (surname) =

Frobisher is an occupational surname, a variant form of 'furbisher', i.e. a person who 'furbishes' (burnishes) weapons and armour as part of the production process (Middle English fourbishour, from Old French forbisseor). Notable people with the surname include:

- Benjamin Frobisher (1742–1787), Canadian fur trader
- Benjamin Joseph Frobisher (1782–1821), Canadian fur trader and politician, son of Joseph Frobisher
- Joseph Frobisher (1740–1810), Canadian fur trader and politician, brother of Benjamin and Thomas Frobisher
- Martin Frobisher (c. 1535 – 1594), English sailor and explorer
- Thomas Frobisher (1744–1788), Canadian fur trader, brother of Joseph and Benjamin Frobisher

Fictional characters:

- Arthur Frobisher, villainous billionaire in the television series Damages
- Buck Frobisher, character in the television series Due South
- John Frobisher, character in Torchwood: Children of Earth
- Robert Frobisher, composer in the novel Cloud Atlas and mentioned in other David Mitchell books
