= Roderick Mackenzie of Terrebonne =

Canadian fur trader, landowner and politician

The Honourable Roderick Mackenzie
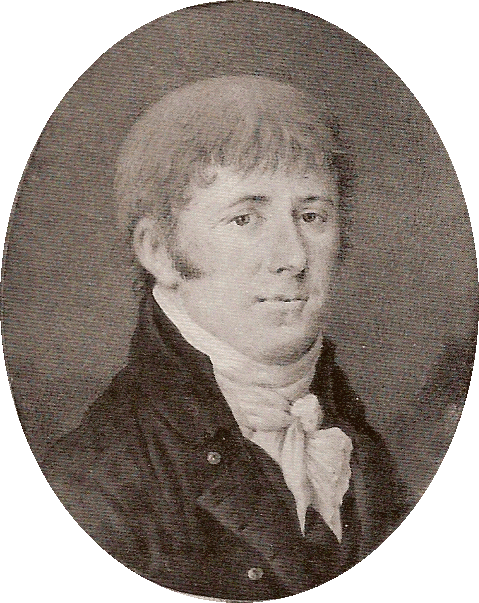

Member of the Legislative Council of Lower Canada
- In office 1817–1838

Personal details
- Born: 1761 Achiltibuie, Ross and Cromarty
- Died: August 15, 1844 (aged 82–83) Terrebonne, Canada East
- Children: Three, including Matooskie (also known as Nancy)

Lt.-Colonel The Hon. Roderick Mackenzie of Terrebonne (c.1761 − August 15, 1844) was a Canadian fur trader, landowner and politician. He was a partner in the North West Company and a member of the Beaver Club at Montreal. He was a lifelong friend and the private confidant of his first cousin, Sir Alexander Mackenzie. He was an intellectual who established a library at Fort Chipewyan and both wrote and published works on the fur trade. In 1801 he made his home at Terrebonne, Quebec, purchasing the Seigneury in 1814, although he was forced by a court action to relinquish his title to the property in 1824. He continued to live there until his death. He held many public appointments, most notably as a member of the Legislative Council of Lower Canada.

== Early life ==
Roderick Mackenzie was born in the Scottish Highlands at Achiltibuie in about 1761. He was the second son of Alexander Mackenzie (1737−1789) of Achnaclerach, who was killed after falling from his horse following a dinner at Brahan Castle with his cousin, the Chief of Clan Mackenzie. Roderick's father was the grandson of James Mackenzie (d.1746) of Keppoch and Kildonan, a first cousin of John Mackenzie (d. 1731), 2nd Earl of Cromartie, and Sir Kenneth Mackenzie, 3rd Bt. Roderick's mother, Catherine Mackenzie, was the niece of Murdoch Mackenzie, 6th Laird of Fairburn. Her brother, Kenneth 'Corc' Mackenzie (1731−1780), of Stornoway, was the father of Sir Alexander Mackenzie.

In 1767, his father and grandmother lost the tack of Achiltibuie. It is widely thought that Roderick was sent to live with his uncle, Kenneth Mackenzie, at Stornoway, where he developed his lifelong friendship with his first cousin, Sir Alexander Mackenzie. He was educated with his cousin at the same school as Colin Mackenzie. In 1784, at Alexander's invitation, Roderick came out to Quebec.

== Fur trade ==
In 1785, Mackenzie was employed as a clerk and as his cousin Alexander's assistant in the fur trading firm of Gregory, McLeod & Co., of Montreal. Mackenzie spent the winter of 1786/87 at Pinehouse Lake, reporting that the rival between their firm and the North West Company had resulted in the murder of one of their firm's wintering partners. To end the tension, Simon McTavish invited Gregory, McLeod & Co., to become part of the North West Company.

In 1787, Alexander (viewing his position as a clerk akin to slavery) persuaded Roderick not to leave the fur trade, and Roderick joined Alexander in the District of Athabasca to establish Fort Chipewyan as the NWC's headquarters in the region. It was here that Roderick established a library (see section 'Private Life'). During Alexander's many absences on his voyages, Roderick was left in charge, eventually succeeding him in 1794 when Alexander returned to Montreal. In 1795, Roderick was made a partner of the North West Company.

Returning to Montreal in 1800, Mackenzie was made a partner in the newly organised firm of McTavish, Frobisher & Co. Other partners included William McGillivray, Duncan McGillivray and William Hallowell. He agreed to spend one last winter (1800/01) in Western Canada, before settling down to live at Terrebonne. Having retired as a wintering partner of the NWC, he surrendered one of his two shares, and gave up the other when the NWC absorbed the XY Company. He continued to attend NWC meetings at Fort William until 1808.

In 1806, McTavish, Frobisher & Co. became McTavish, McGillivrays & Co., and Mackenzie retired from the firm in 1813. His one fifteenth share was bought out by the other partners for £10,000, a sizable amount of money back then. From about 1805 until 1825, he was in a business partnership with his brother, Henry, in the firm of Mackenzie, Oldham & Co., whose partners included the Hallowells and several other prominent fur traders. He had retained a financial connection with McTavish & McGillivrays, which went bankrupt in 1825. Mackenzie successfully sued the partners (that included his brother Henry) for £7,308 plus interest. He was unable to collect on the debt and in 1832 sold his claim to Samuel Gerrard for £6,500.

== Public appointments ==
In 1812, Mackenzie was commissioned Lt.-Colonel of the Terrebonne militia. From 1804 to 1816, he was Justice of the Peace for the Indian Territory, and from 1821 to 1839 he was the same for the districts of Montreal, Quebec, Trois-Rivières, Gaspé, and Saint-François. He was Commissioner of Roads and Bridges for Effingham County in 1817 and promoted improvements to the Rivière des Prairies in 1819. He was also Commissioner for free schools at Terrebonne–Effingham in 1809, and on a commission to study the best means of building a bridge between Montreal and the mainland in 1832.

His most important appointment came in 1817, when he was placed on the Legislative Council of Lower Canada, solidifying his standing as one of the most important men in Lower Canada. He was very active in the 1820s and enjoyed a close relationship with the Governor, George Ramsay, 9th Earl of Dalhousie. He supported the joining of Lower and Upper Canada, and vigorously opposed the Patriote majority in the Legislative Assembly.

== Private life ==
Mackenzie was a tough and resourceful man, but he was also an intellectual and fluently bilingual. While wintering in the North West he not only had books sent for him on a regular basis, but also established a library for North West Company employees at Fort Chipewyan in Athabasca, which led them to refer to the Fort as "the little Athens of the Arctic regions".

On settling at Terrebonne he spent much of his available time collecting information on the Canadian fur trade, Canadian First Nations and the natural history of Western Canada. Much of the information that he gathered was collected and published as Les Bourgeois de la Compagnie du Nord-Ouest, by his granddaughter's husband, The Hon. Louis-Rodrigue Masson. Mackenzie collected and posthumously published a copy of Simon Fraser's journal relating to his voyage from the Rocky Mountains to the Pacific coast in 1808. He is also credited as the author of the introduction to his cousin, Sir Alexander Mackenzie's, book Voyages from Montreal, which gives an overall history of the fur trade at that time. Roderick Mackenzie was a member of the Literary and Historical Society of Quebec and of the American Antiquarian Society. He was also a fellow of the "Royal Society of Northern Antiquaries" at Copenhagen, Denmark.

Roderick Mackenzie, though less of a maverick, was a great deal more diplomatic than his better known cousin, Sir Alexander. The two were close friends, and Roderick publicly supported his cousin throughout his many ventures, while being Alexander's private confidant. When Alexander quarrelled with Simon McTavish and left the North West Company, Roderick reluctantly filled the vacancy offered to him by McTavish. This incident resulted in Alexander ceasing his correspondence with Roderick from 1800 to 1805. However, from 1805 they resumed their close friendship uninterrupted until their deaths.

== Terrebonne ==
In 1814, Mackenzie purchased the Seigneury of Terrebonne from the estate of his deceased brother-in-law, Simon McTavish. He paid an initial £8,000 and agreed to pay a further £1,200 a year until the total of £28,000 was settled. Mackenzie intended to continue McTavish's developments and had made plans to raise the annual revenue from £1,000 to £3,000. However, his sister-in-law, Marie-Marguerite (Chaboillez) McTavish, disagreed with the sale stating that the executors of her late husband's will had exceeded their authority in allowing it to be sold. A court action was brought against Mackenzie and in 1824 he was forced to relinquish his title to the property.

Roderick Mackenzie's home in Terrebonne was one of the best-known in the area, with a six-stepped porch and four white columns supporting a second floor balcony. Mackenzie's brother-in-law, Joseph Bouchette, visited Terrebonne in 1815 and remarked, "...the mansion of Roderick Mackenzie, which is worthy of remark for the elegance of its construction; indeed there are several houses in a very superior style to be found in this village, it being a favoured spot, where many gentlemen, who have realised large fortunes in the North West Company fur trade retire to enjoy the comforts and luxuries of private life". Mackenzie lived there with his family from 1801 until his death at the house in 1844.

== Family ==
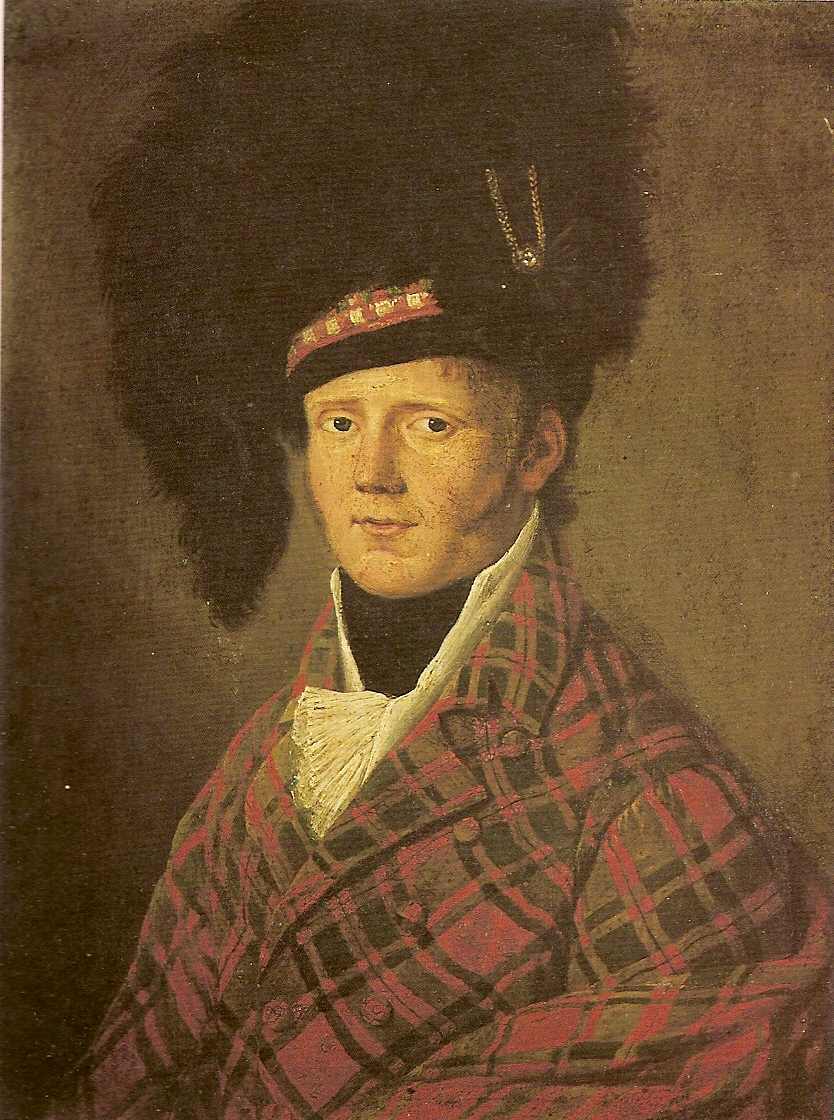
Lieutenant John Mackenzie (1794−1871), the eldest son of Roderick Mackenzie. Painted by William Berczy, 1811

While in the North West, Mackenzie took a country wife, by whom he had four children. In 1803, at Montreal, he married Marie-Louise-Rachel Chaboillez, daughter of Charles Chaboillez. Through this marriage he became the brother-in-law of Simon McTavish and connected to Joseph Frobisher, who was married to his wife's first cousin. They were the parents of two sons and three daughters who survived infancy. Roderick Mackenzie's nine surviving children were:

- Nancy Mackenzie (c. 1790−1851), was the country wife of John George McTavish, partner of the North West Company and member of the Beaver Club, through his kinsman Simon McTavish. He was the second son of the Chief of Clan MacTavish, Dugald MacTavish (1782−1855), of Kilchrist Castle; Sheriff of Campbeltown. They were the parents of five children.
- Anne Louisa Mackenzie (c. 1793−1833), married Angus Bethune, the eldest of the several distinguished sons of the Rev. John Bethune. Anne Louisa Mackenzie is great-grandmother to Norman Bethune, famous Canadian physician.
- Lieut. John Mackenzie (1794−1871), a wealthy merchant, entrepreneur and Postmaster of Terrebonne. At Montreal, he married Mary Catherine Oldham, daughter of The Hon. Jacob Oldham (1768−1824), nephew of The Hon. Jacob Jordan, and his wife Madeleine Campion. They were the parents of six children.
- Catherine Margaret Mackenzie (b. 1800), married Robert Lester Morrogh, formerly of Quebec City, nephew of The Hon. Robert Lester. Their eldest daughter, Susan, married Sir Charles Boucher de Boucherville, Prime Minister of Quebec.
- Rachel Mackenzie. In 1843, she married Jean-Baptiste Bruyère (1809-1859), of Châteauguay.
- Lt.-Colonel Alexander Mackenzie (1805−1862), was an officer in the British Army and a partner in the North West Company. In 1833, at Montreal, he married Marie-Louise Trottier DesRivières (1812−1890), youngest daughter of François-Amable DesRivières (1764−1830) and a niece of The Hon. James McGill. They were the parents of fourteen children. Their eldest daughter, Louise, married The Hon. Louis-Rodrigue Masson, Lieutenant Governor of Quebec.
- Charles Roderick Mackenzie (b. 1816), became a lawyer at Montreal.
- Anne Caroline Mackenzie (1822−1867), married Joseph Wilfrid Antoine Raymond Masson, a brother of the previously mentioned Louis-Rodrigue Masson - two of the sons of The Hon. Joseph Masson, of Terrebonne.
- Henry Oldham Mackenzie (1825−1879), of Montreal.
