= John Strettell =

English merchant (1721–1786)

John Strettell (1721–1786) of London, England, was one of the most important merchants providing trade goods to the Canadian fur trade in the period between the Conquest of Canada and his death in 1786.

Born in 1721, he was the second son of Robert Strettell, a London merchant and Quaker. Robert Strettell took most of his family to Philadelphia, Pennsylvania, where he was successful in business and became Mayor of Philadelphia. John remained in England, and was trained in business by his mother's brother, the merchant John Owen.

== Commission merchant ==
The business was that of a commission merchant, who supplied English manufactured goods to American merchants on credit, and sold the goods that the customers sent to pay their debts. John Strettell became his uncle's partner, and later carried on the business alone. By 1758 he was shipping trade goods to the Indian Commissioners of the colony of Pennsylvania, and he continued to trade to Pennsylvania at least till the outbreak of the Revolutionary War.

== Furs ==
It was in Canada, however, that Strettell made his great success. Near the end of his career, he referred to "my Canada Friends, to whose favours I principally owe my present happy circumstances". Once Canada had passed into British hands, Strettell lost no time in taking advantage of the new market now available, a market largely dependent on the fur trade. In the spring of 1761, the first season when the fur trade could be re-established west of Montreal, he was already seeking permission from the Privy Council to send gunpowder to Canada for the Indian trade. During the period of military government of Canada, when severe restrictions were placed on the fur trade, Strettell was one of the London merchants who signed petitions to the Colonial Office, seeking relaxation of the regulations. He represented the "Canada merchants" who petitioned for the abolition of the Stamp Act and other offensive duties in 1765, and he led the effort to remove James Murray from the governorship of Quebec. Strettell's interest in various branches of the trade to America is further shown by his activity in collecting money for the relief of sufferers from the Montreal fire in 1765, and from the fire in Bridgetown, Barbados, in 1766; and for the establishment of what later became Brown University, in 1768.

When the Northwest fur trade, into the present western Canada, was re-established in the late 1760s and after, John Strettell provided the goods for some of the most important traders. Among his Canadian customers were the partnership of Isaac Todd and James McGill, and that of Benjamin Frobisher and Joseph Frobisher. These two partnerships, forming the earliest version of the North West Company, were the most energetic in the Northwest fur trade in the years just before the American Revolution. Strettell also provided goods to other Canadian merchants, notably John Paterson and Charles Grant of Quebec, William Grant of St. Roch, and Richard Dobie of Montreal. These men were the richest of the pre-Revolution merchants in Canada. When the London merchants petitioned Parliament in late 1774, expressing their concerns about political developments in America, Strettell, along with Brook Watson and Robert Hunter, signed on behalf of the merchants with interests in Canada. He continued to have business interests in Pennsylvania, and in the West Indies.

Strettell continued his business in Canada through the American Revolutionary War. He supported about half the shares in the North West Company when it was reorganized in 1784, and the reorganization probably could not have taken place without his approval. Soon after, his health began to fail, and he arranged for his Canada and other business to be transferred to a new partnership between his long-time chief clerk, John Brickwood, and a returned East India employee, Thomas Pattle. With various reorganizations, the Brickwood firm remained important well into the next century.

== Charity ==
Like other London Quakers, Strettell took a keen interest in charitable works, such as a project to purchase fish and potatoes for the London poor during the severe winter of 1767, and another, in 1777, for the relief of American prisoners of war, held in prisons in England under circumstances of great privation.

Strettell died on 20 July 1786. He had not married until he was in his mid-fifties, in 1776. In that year, at a Quaker ceremony, he married Mary Hayling, said to have been his housekeeper. They had two sons, one of whom died in childhood, while the other, Amos, inherited his father's fortune.
