= Frobisher =

Frobisher is an archaic word for a metal polisher. It may refer to:

== People ==
- Frobisher (surname), a surname shared by several real and fictional people

== Places ==
- Frobisher, Saskatchewan
- Frobisher Bay, a bay in Baffin Island, named after Martin Frobisher
- Frobisher Bay, the former name of a town in Baffin Island, Canada, now known as Iqaluit
- Frobisher Lake, a lake in central Saskatchewan

== Other uses ==
- Frobisher (Doctor Who), a character from the comic strips based on the television series Doctor Who
- Robert Frobisher, a character from David Mitchell's novel Cloud Atlas
- HMS Frobisher, two ships of the Royal Navy
- Frobisher Says, a video game
