= Andrew Todd (fur trader) =

Andrew Todd (c. 1754–1796) was an Ulster merchant and fur trader at Montreal and Louisiana. Born into a wealthy family at Coleraine, County Londonderry, he was the son of Daniel Todd (1735–1783) of Randalstown, County Antrim, and his wife Letitia Thornton, sister of Lt.-General Sir William Thornton. He came to North America to work in the trading firm of his uncle, Isaac Todd, who was the business partner of James McGill at Montreal. He became a junior partner of the firm and in 1791 was admitted as a member of the Beaver Club. In 1794, the Spanish Governor, Francisco Luis Héctor de Carondelet, granted him an exclusive monopoly over all the trade in Louisiana; highly sought after particularly by Canadians as it was then still separate to the United States. This gave him the exclusive right to the valuable trade on the Upper Mississippi River, the Missouri River and the area north of Ohio. He jealously defended his position and soon became known in the region as "Don Andreas", successfully sending vast stores of goods up from New Orleans while bringing back furs. His uncle's firm back in Montreal, Todd, McGill & Co., had found itself in a position to then monopolize the supply of the entire Mississippi Valley, but the declaration of war between Spain and Britain in October 1796, followed by Andrew's death at New Orleans later that year, dashed their expectations. At his decease, Andrew Todd was unmarried and left no children. By his will, he released his slave, Jack, and left his entire estate to his uncle, Isaac, except for $500 that he left to James McGill, the other executor of his will.
