= Peter Pond =

British explorer, cartographer, merchant and soldier

- Born: January 18, 1739; Milford, Connecticut
- Died: 1807 (aged 67–68); Milford, Connecticut
- Occupations: Explorer, cartographer, merchant soldier, fur-trader

Peter Pond (January 18, 1739 – 1807) was an explorer, cartographer, merchant and soldier who was a founding member of the North West Company. Though he was born and died in Milford, Connecticut, most of his life was spent in northwestern North America, on the upper Mississippi and in western Canada.

== Early life ==
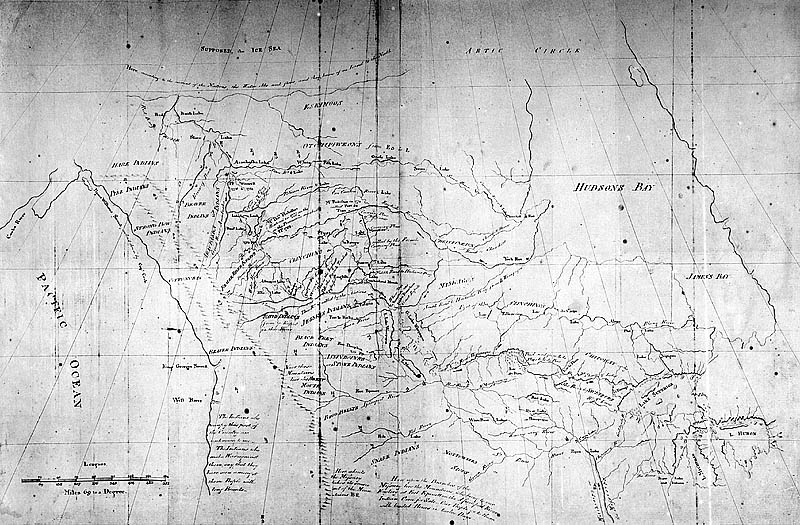
Copy of a map presented to the Congress of the United States and to the Lieutenant Governor of Quebec by Peter Pond, 1785. (National Archives of Canada)

Peter Pond was born on January 18, 1739, in Milford, Connecticut, the oldest child of Peter Pond and Mary Hubbard. His father was a shoemaker and was teaching his son the craft but Peter (junior) was restless and wanted a more adventurous life. In 1756, at the age of sixteen, Pond joined the army to fight in the French and Indian War.

Pond first enlisted as a private in the 1st Connecticut Regiment, a provincial infantry unit. In June, the company sailed up the Hudson River and gathered for an attack on the French at Fort Carillon, on the southern end of Lake Champlain. However, the regiment was ill-prepared for winter and the force was dispersed before an attack could take place. In 1758, Pond joined the Connecticut Regiment again for another attack on Fort Carillon. In 1759, Pond enlisted as a sergeant in the Suffolk County Regiment at Long Island, New York. Pond's regiment was sent to attack Fort Niagara, strategically located on the Niagara River at its confluence with Lake Ontario. Pond served as an orderly to the commander, William Johnson, and was present when the fort was captured. Pond enlisted for a final summer campaign in 1760, fighting under General Jeffrey Amherst. He served as a commissioned officer in a light infantry regiment. Pond participated in the capture of Fort Lévis in August 1760 and was present at Montreal when the French city surrendered to the British in September 1760.

Through his business he became acquainted with Alexander Henry the elder, Simon McTavish and the brothers Thomas, Benjamin and Joseph Frobisher. They became the founders of the North West Company (NWC) in 1779, which developed a fierce rivalry with the Hudson's Bay Company (HBC). Working for the group, in search of new fur resources, Pond went to the area west of the Great Lakes. In 1776–1778 he wintered at a fur post he established at the junction of the Sturgeon River and North Saskatchewan River near present-day Prince Albert, Saskatchewan. The site is today a national historic site of Canada.

He was chosen to take four canoes northward into the Athabasca region. He took his party through the Portage La Loche (the Methye portage). It took the group eight days to travel about 12 miles (19 km). In 1778–1779 he wintered at Pond House, a post he built on the Athabasca River, 60 km from Lake Athabasca. Likely this was the first fur trading post inside today's Alberta. He collected so many furs he did not have capacity to haul them all away in one trip. He operated this post, the first non-indigenous building in present-day Alberta, for ten years.

At Lac La Ronge, Jean-Étienne Waddens had a lucrative trade with “the Northward Indians” coming from Lake Athabasca. In late 1781, Pond, a man who too represented the company's interests, joined him. However, they were on bad terms. In March 1782, Pond fatally wounded Waddens in a fight. The act was called murder. In 1783, Mrs. Waddens requested the governor of Quebec, Frederick Haldimand, to arrest Pond, submitting an affidavit of one of Waddens's men. Pond was examined in 1785 but was not brought to trial, most likely because Lac La Ronge lay in the territories of the HBC, beyond the jurisdiction of the Province of Quebec.

== Explorations ==
In 1783, Pond's explorations led him again to the Athabasca, a region stretching from Lac Île-à-la-Crosse to the Peace River. There he explored waterways around Lake Athabasca and determined the approximate locations of Great Slave Lake and Great Bear Lake from First Nations peoples of the area. From his notes and diaries Peter Pond drew a map showing rivers and lakes of the Athabasca region, including what was known of the whole area from Hudson Bay to the Rocky Mountains and interpolating his information to the Arctic Ocean or Northwest Passage.

In 1785, one copy of Pond's map, accompanied by a detailed report, was submitted to the United States Congress and a second to the Lieutenant Governor of Quebec, Henry Hamilton. Pond needed financial support to carry his explorations to the limits of North America's northwest, but the British government was not forthcoming. A partner in the NWC, founded in 1784, he was in charge of the company business in the Athabasca and Peace River areas. An ambitious man with a reputation for having a violent temper, he was implicated in two murders (one of a rival trader): Although acquitted on the murder charges, the company replaced him with Alexander Mackenzie. In the process of taking over the management of the business Mackenzie learned a great deal from Peter Pond about the Athabasca and Peace River region. Pond left the NWC in 1788.

== Later life and death ==
In 1790, Pond sold his shares in the NWC to William McGillivray and returned to Milford, Connecticut. He may have become involved in the family trading ventures and there is some evidence he maintained contacts with persons in the US government. In 1802, he was sent by Henry Knox on a fact finding mission to Detroit.

Peter Pond died of tuberculosis on March 6, 1807.

== Legacy ==
Mackenzie was intrigued by Pond's belief that the tributaries of that area, which could be seen gathering into a great river flowing northwestward, flowed to the Northwest Passage. Mackenzie took the initiative to follow up on Pond's belief and followed this great river to its mouth; the watercourse, now called the Mackenzie River, did in fact flow to the Northwest Passage section of the Arctic Ocean. Peter Pond had contributed to the mapping of Canada by drawing the general outline of the river basin that Mackenzie recorded in 1789. The maps that Peter Pond subsequently drew, based on his explorations and on the information provided to him by First Nations peoples, ultimately gained international recognition for Pond at the end of the 18th century.
