= Isaac Todd =

Canadian merchant (c.1742–1819)

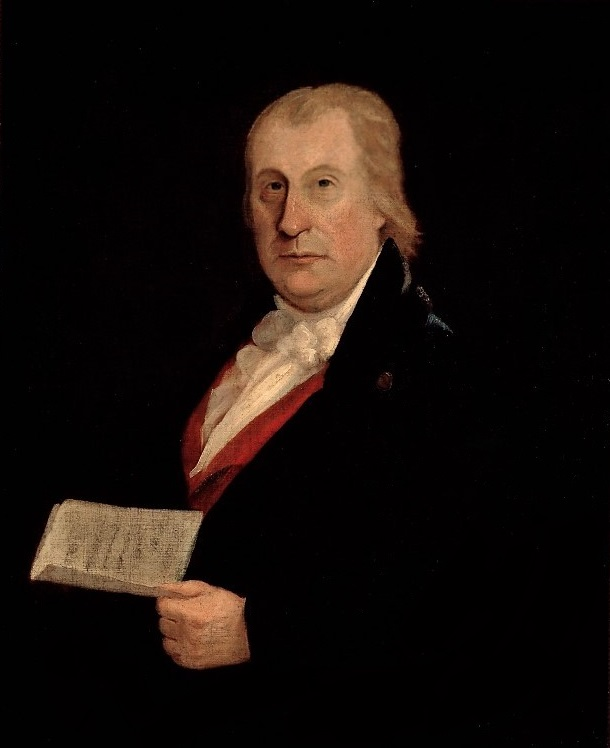
- Born: c. 1742; Coleraine, County Londonderry, Ireland
- Died: 22 May 1819 (aged 76–77); Bath, Somerset, England
- Known for: Pioneer of the British-Canadian fur trade, one of the founding senior partners of the North West Company

Isaac Todd (c. 1742 – 1819) was one of Montreal's most prominent merchants following the British Conquest of New France and a founding member of the Beaver Club at Montreal and the Canada Club at London. He was one of the earliest partners in the North West Company before it was formalized, but was better known for his partnership with James McGill. In 1812, he purchased Buncrana Castle in Inishowen, County Donegal, which he left to his nephew, William Thornton-Todd, the younger brother of Andrew Todd.

== Early life ==
Isaac Todd was born around 1742 into a wealthy merchant family at Coleraine, County Londonderry, in Ulster, the son of John Todd and his wife Elizabeth Patterson. Elizabeth was a native of Fox Hall, near Ramelton, in County Donegal, also in Ulster. The Todds, established members of the local Protestant gentry, had been prospering at Coleraine since at least 1630 and held several valuable land leases from the Earls of Antrim. Isaac Todd spent his early manhood as a merchant in his native Ulster in the north of Ireland, but, after the British Conquest of New France, he was quick to seize upon the trade opportunities now available in Canada. He was established in Montreal by 1764, and his ready access to capital and patronage through his family at home no doubt aided his early ventures there. His first cousin, Walter Patterson, was the first Governor of Prince Edward Island from 1769 to 1787.

== The Fur Trade ==
Todd was living in Montreal by 1764, and soon entered the fur trade. He was arrested for trading without a licence on Lake Ontario in the summer of 1766, but this seems to have done him no harm, perhaps because he had friends in high places. His partner in the late 1760s was another Irishman, Richard McNeall; one of them managed affairs at Montreal while the other (usually Todd) took care of their trade at Detroit and Michilimackinac, where he developed a close friendship with Alexander Henry the elder. Trading at Michilimackinac made Todd aware of opportunities that were just opening up beyond Grand Portage, and starting in 1767, he sent wintering clerks into the Northwest, who traded with considerable success.

By the early 1770s, Todd was investing large amounts in the trade beyond Grand Portage, cooperating with other Montreal traders such as Benjamin Frobisher and Maurice Blondeau in what was sometimes referred to as the North West Company. Todd's partnership with McNeall ended in 1773; he already had a business relationship with James McGill, which was formalized as the company of Todd & McGill in 1776. During a visit to England in 1775-6, Todd made an agreement with the London commission merchant John Strettell to provide trade goods to the new partnership, and Todd & McGill were soon among Strettell's most important Canadian customers.

Todd and McGill continued to take part in the Northwest trade through the American War of Independence, but when the North West Company was organised on a long-term basis in 1783-4, they were not included, choosing instead to concentrate on the still lucrative "Southwest trade" out of Lake Michigan into the Mississippi valley. This trade continued until the posts of Detroit and Michilimackinac were surrendered to the Americans in 1796. By that time, Todd was speculating in land, and probably had other business interests which are difficult to document today. He took an interest in public affairs, but never ran for political office, and seems to have moved back and forth across the Atlantic, uncertain where to settle, and alarming his friends with complaints of ill health. He died in 1819 at the English resort town of Bath.

== Family ==
In 1812, Todd purchased Buncrana, a town in Inishowen, County Donegal, in his native Ulster, from the trustees of the bankrupt estate of The 2nd Marquess of Donegall. Todd never married, and most of his estate was left to his nephews. But, through a relationship with his housekeeper, Jane Kyle, he was the father of one daughter whom he recognised as his child and provided for in his will. He was a close friend of the explorer Alexander Henry, and his 'wife' sponsored Henry's youngest child. Todd's daughter by Jane Kyle,

- Eleanor Todd. On her father's death in 1819, she received £8,000. In 1823, she was married at Buncrana Castle to John Chambers (d.1845), of Fox Hall, County Donegal. They were the parents of two daughters, Eliza and Eleanor (who married Alexander B. Kennedy).

== See also ==
- Isaac Todd – a ship launched in 1811 that wrecked in 1821.
