= Josiah Bleakley =

Canadian fur trader

Josiah Bleakley (c. 1754 – 22 January 1822) was a Canadian fur trader from Lower Canada.

Bleakley was an important member of the fur trade industry during his period of activity which was definitely in place by 1774. He was a contemporary of James McGill although he never achieved that type of stature in the trading community.
