= Alexander Henry the elder =

American-born Canadian explorer, author and merchant

Alexander Henry 'The Elder'
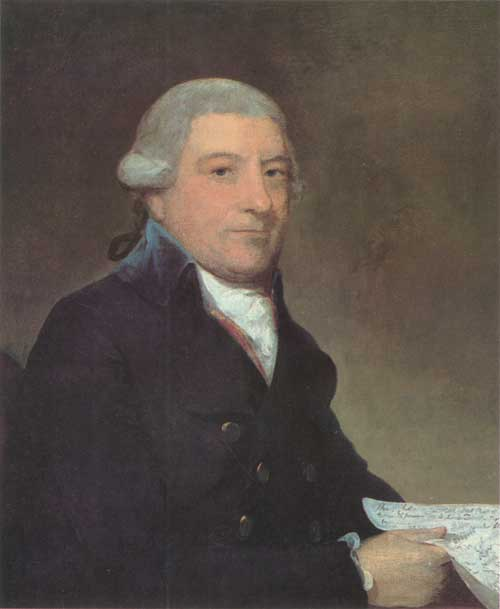
- Born: August 1739; New Brunswick, New Jersey
- Died: 4 April 1824 (aged 84); Montreal, Quebec
- Known for: Explorer, author, original founder of the Beaver Club, and pioneer of the British-Canadian fur trade
- Spouse: Julia Calcutt Kittson
- Children: 6

Alexander Henry 'The Elder', in French: Alexandre Henri Le Vieux (August 1739 – 4 April 1824) was an American-born explorer, author, merchant who settled in Quebec following the Conquest of New France and was a partner in the North West Company and a founding member and vice-chairman of the Beaver Club. From 1763 to 1764, he lived and hunted with Wawatam of the Ojibwe, who had adopted him as a brother.

"Blessed with as many lives as a cat", he recounted his time with the Ojibwe and subsequent explorations in his Travels and Adventures in Canada and the Indian Territories between the years 1760 and 1776 (published in New York City in 1809), which he dedicated to his friend Sir Joseph Banks. The book is considered an adventure classic and one of the best descriptions of Native Indian life at this time.

An "easy and dignified" raconteur, in 1776 Henry was invited to give an account of his journeys at the Royal Society in London and at Versailles to Queen Marie Antoinette. In the 1780s, Henry introduced John Jacob Astor into the North American fur trade; subsequently, Astor would stay as Henry's guest during his annual visits to Montreal.

== Early life ==
Alexander Henry was born at New Brunswick, New Jersey, to an educated merchant family related to Matthew Henry. His father was from England and his mother was from Wales. He was the eldest son of John Henry (d. 1766), a merchant whose father, Alexander Henry (d. 1744), had emigrated to British North America from the West of England to seek his fortune. He received a good education and afterward took an apprenticeship in business. From the age of twenty, Henry was working as a merchant out of Albany, New York. He made a lucrative but hazardous living supplying the British army during the French and Indian War (the North American front of the Seven Years' War). In 1760, after Wolfe's victory at the Battle of the Plains of Abraham, Henry was placed in charge of three loaded supply bateaux, which followed Lord Amherst's advance along Lake Ontario to Montreal. In 1760, Henry was the first British subject known to have visited the area of Milwaukee.

In early 1761, at Les Cèdres, Henry met the former fur trader Jean-Baptiste Leduc, who acquainted him with the rich possibilities of trading at Michilimackinac and around Lake Superior. That spring at Montreal, he secured a fur trade pass from Thomas Gage, the second British subject (by only a few days) to do so. Henry wrote, "proposing to avail myself of the new market, which was thus thrown open to British adventure, I... procured a quantity of goods" and set out on the Ottawa River to Fort Michilimackinac. As he was "altogether a stranger to the commerce in which (he) was engaging," he stopped while still in Canada to hire a guide, Etienne-Charles Campion, an experienced voyageur.

== Michilimackinac and the Ojibwe ==
In 1761, as they travelled west, Henry was repeatedly warned by the Indians they encountered not to risk his life among the Ojibwe, who remained fiercely loyal to the French. When Henry took the warnings seriously, he did not have enough supplies to turn back. He disguised himself as a voyageur and let Campion pass for the proprietor. No one was fooled. When he arrived among the Ojibwe at Michilimackinac, Henry found himself surrounded by sixty of their warriors, "each with his tomahawk in one hand, and scalping knife in the other." The imposingly tall war chief Mihnehwehna reminded him that the British may have conquered the French, but they had not conquered the Ojibwe. After capturing New France, the British had neglected to make peace with the Indian allies of the French. Having put to use all of his diplomatic skills for which he would become well known, Henry "inwardly endured the tortures of suspense" before Mineweh declared that he admired Henry's bravery for entering their lands. He said since Henry did not come intending to make war, he could "sleep tranquilly" among them. That winter of 1761–62, a minor Ojibwe chief, Wawatam, adopted Henry as a brother. Henry described the Ojibwe as "peaceful", "wholesome", "kind" and "trustworthy" and said that he had a "great and deep respect" for them.

Henry's ability to make friends with both the French and their allied Indians greatly facilitated his trading activities. Between 1762 and 1763, Henry did business at Sault Ste Marie, where he formed friendships with Jean Baptiste Cadot. (father of Michel Cadotte) and Sir Robert Davers. However, when they returned to Michilimackinac, Chief Pontiac had already launched a pan-tribal offensive against British outposts in the Ohio Country. The Ojibwe warriors attacked Fort Michilimackinac. Danvers was killed and Henry, after hiding for a time in the house of Charles Michel de Langlade, was captured by the Ojibwe.

On June 6, Henry and three other British prisoners were taken by canoe toward Beaver Island. As they reached Waugoshance Point, an Odawa tribal appeared and spoke with them, luring them close to land. Several Odawa warriors sprang from cover and charged the canoe, forcibly removing the four prisoners, who were taken back to Mackinac.

During the ensuing division of the spoils from the fort, Henry ended up as a possession of the Ojibwe leader Minavavana. Fortunately Wawatam intervened and spirited Henry away to his own lodge. Several days later, when Henry was threatened again, Wawatam came to his rescue and hid him in Mackinac Island's Skull Cave overnight.

He lived with the Wawatam and his family for nearly a year and followed them on their seasonal moves to hunting and fishing territories in lower Michigan. Henry's experiences during this winter of 1763–64, described in his memoirs, are a valuable primary source into Native American life during the fur trade era.

They returned to Michilimackinac in the spring of 1764 to trade their furs, but some of the Ojibwe residing in Saginaw Bay plotted to kill Henry, and Wawatam permitted him to go to Sault Ste Marie to seek the protection of Cadotte. He was still not safe since another Ojibwe chief, Madjeckewiss, followed him there with some of his warriors intent on killing him, and it took Cadotte's diplomatic skills to dissuade them. Soon afterward, Sir William Johnson at last held a peace conference at Fort Niagara, and both Henry and the Ojibwes attended. Eager to return to Michilimackinac to recover his property, Henry accompanied the expedition of Colonel John Bradstreet from Niagara to Detroit, and from there, he went with Captain William Howard's troops who reoccupied Michilimackinac in September, 1764.

== Lake Superior and the Canadian Northwest ==
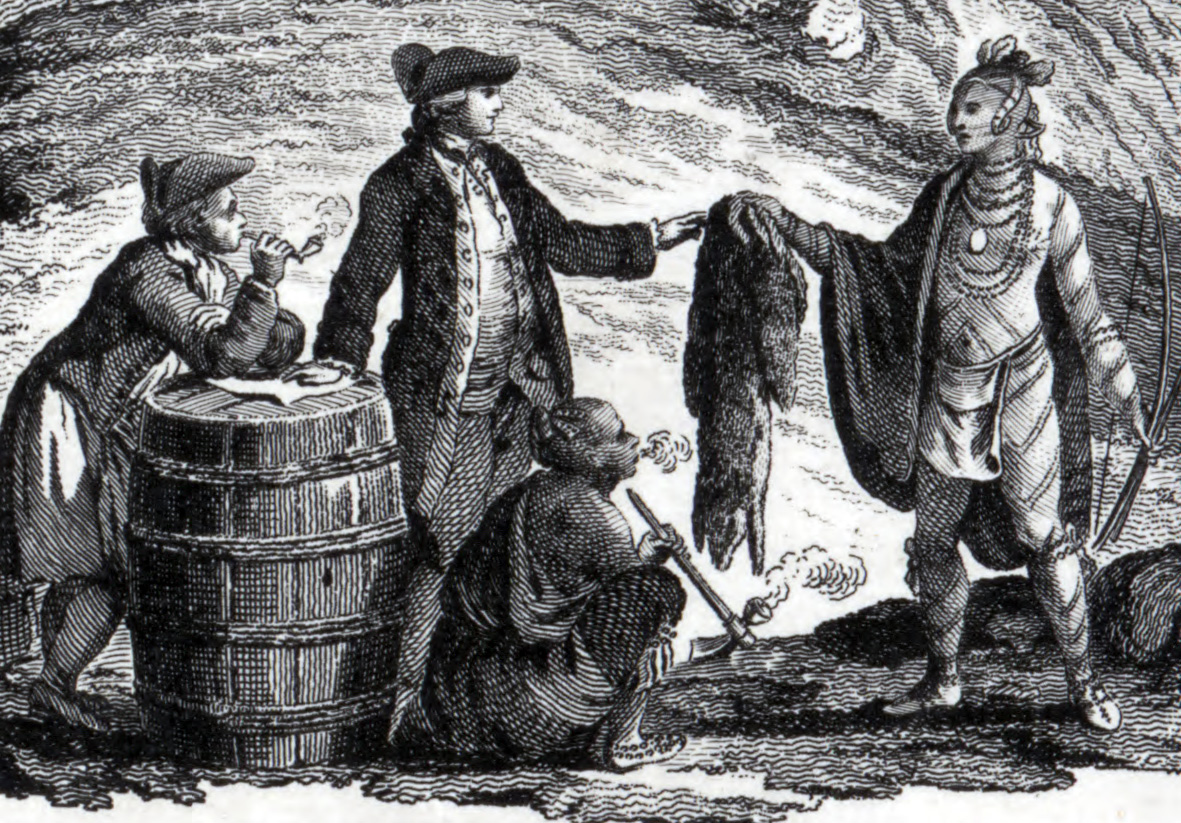
A Canadian fur trader in 1777

In 1765, Henry acquired a license to trade in the Lake Superior region. Combining British capital with French Canadian experience, he formed a partnership with Cadot. For the next few years Henry was able to maintain a complete monopoly over the Lake Superior trade and without competition he was able to charge exorbitant prices. There, he also came into contact with the Frontiersman Robert Rogers, but Henry reported that Rogers never paid him for certain services rendered.

In 1767–68 he wintered on the Michipicoten River and entered into a partnership with Sir William Johnson, the Duke of Gloucester and others, forming a company to mine silver found in copper ore on the shores of Lake Superior. The expenses involved made the venture unprofitable and the company wound up its affairs in 1774.

In 1775, Henry took four large and twelve small canoes to explore the territory northwest of Lake Superior. Henry, Cadot, Peter Pond, the brothers Thomas and Joseph Frobisher then began to challenge the Hudson's Bay Company. Their group, with forty men, stopped at Cumberland House and afterwards built a trading post on Amisk Lake, the first post to be built north of the Saskatchewan River. In 1776, Henry set off by foot to Fort à la Corne, following the Saskatchewan River, and having satisfied his curiosity secured some furs from the Assiniboines. He then purchased 12,000 additional beaver skins from a trip up the Churchill River from the Chipewyans, and some of his last packs were forcibly acquired from Robert Longmoor, an agent for the Hudson's Bay Company. Laden with furs, Henry returned to Montreal and gave the governor, Sir Guy Carleton, a large map of the western region through which he had travelled.

== England and France ==
Henry's imagination was caught by the rich potential of the Northwest Territories and he sailed to England in the autumn of 1776 with a proposal for the Hudson's Bay Company. Bearing a Letter of introduction from Luc de la Corne to his brother Abbé Joseph-Marie de La Corne de Chaptes, Henry next went to France where he was met with "a most flattering reception". Through the influence of the Abbé, Henry was received by Marie-Antoinette at the French Court. Though he was a natural raconteur who was used to winning friends with ease, it was a great sadness to Henry for the rest of his days that he was met with nothing other than condescension from the young queen and her court.

Henry returned to British North America in 1777 in partnership with Jean-Baptiste Blondeau andtaded at the Michipicoten River and Sault Ste Marie; all the time, he worked closely with his old friend Cadot. Between 1778 and 1781 he visited England three times and developed friendships with Sir Joseph Banks and Daniel Solander. Having discussed the possibility at Banks' residence on Soho Square with him and Solander, on his last trip to England, Henry delivered a detailed plan to Banks for an expedition to find an overland route to the Pacific Ocean. That had seemed possible when they had studied Captain Cook's recent findings, but as it was, Cook had made a mistake and so the planned expedition came to nothing.

== Montreal, Chinese fur trade, and Cuyahoga Purchase ==
Henry had made a prominent name for himself, and from 1781 he settled in Montreal as a general merchant. He was still very much attached to the fur trade with occasional trips made to Detroit or Michilimackinac, and particularly the latter when he sustained heavy losses following the conclusion of the American Revolution. In 1785, Henry with seventeen of the other most prominent fur traders was a founding member of the Beaver Club at Montreal.

During the mid-1780s, Henry encouraged a friend in New York, William Edgar (1736–1820), to enter the trade in furs with China. Fascinated by the prospects offered by the Pacific coast, Henry passed on his ideas, which he called "my favorite plan," to the New York merchant John Jacob Astor. He introduced Astor into the Canadian trade and Astor was Henry's guest during his annual visits to Montreal. In the 1790s, Henry and Astor assisted Simon McTavish and the North West Company in organizing shipments of furs to China. In 1792, a fur trade partnership between John Forsyth, Jacob Jordan and Alexander Ellice attempted to entice Henry and Peter Pond to join them in opposition to the North West Company.

During the 1790s, Henry and another close friend, John Askin, were interested in land speculation in Ohio. One of their ventures, known as the Cuyahoga Purchase, came to naught when the Ohio Indians from whom the land had been acquired at the end of the Northwest Indian War refused to bring forth their land claims at the Treaty of Greenville. The deeds that had been obtained by Henry and his associates were considered invalid, which caused Henry to moan, "We have lost a fortune of at least one million of dollars."

== Later Years at Montreal ==
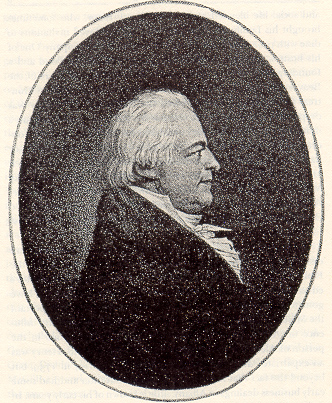
The portrait of Alexander Henry (1739–1824) from his 1809 book

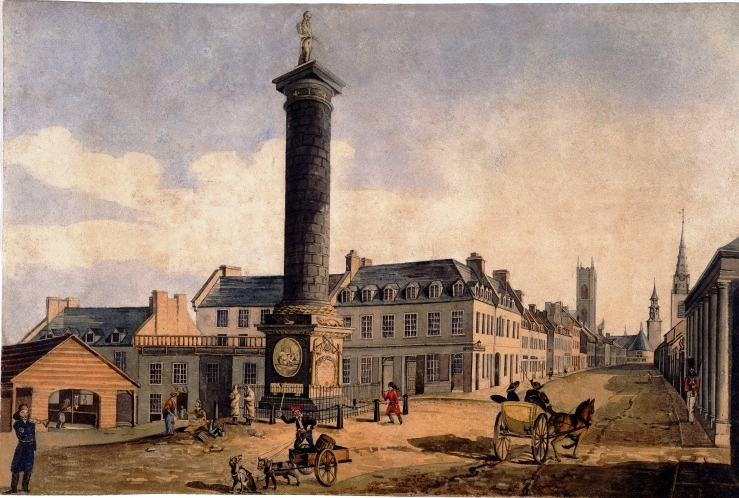
Nelson's Column, Montreal. Erected in 1809, Henry was one of the principal donators.

In 1792, Henry and his nephew Alexander Henry the younger together obtained one share in the North West Company for six years. In 1796 he sold his interest to William Hallowell (1771–1838), but continued to buy furs from traders and export them to England. When one of his uninsured shipments was captured by the French in 1801, he suffered a serious financial crisis. In order to repair his fortunes, Henry became a commission merchant and auctioneer in partnership with William Lindsay. Plagued by ill health, he worked hard at a job that he did not find satisfying.

Despite those reverses of fortune, Henry maintained a secure place in Montreal's mercantile society. He served as a captain in the militia and from 1794 to 1821 as justice of the peace. He lavishly entertained leading merchants in his home, regularly signed petitions and memorials, and attended parties. He was particularly active in the Beaver Club, reactivated in 1807, of which he was the senior member and on its creation, the vice-chairman. In 1806, he was one of the principal donators to the building of Nelson's Column, Montreal. In 1812, he was appointed vendue master and King's Auctioneer for the district of Montreal, working in partnership with his nephew Norman Bethune, who lived with him at 14 Rue Saint-Urbain. He remained close to his old friends, and Isaac Todd, who Henry enjoyed teasing, returned again to Montreal from his native Ireland to be close to Henry and McGill.

In 1809, Henry had written to Askin, "There is only us four old friends (James McGill, Isaac Todd, Joseph Frobisher, and himself) alive, all the new North westards are a parcel of boys and upstarts, who were not born in our time, and supposes they know much more of the Indian trade than any before them." To recapture his exciting past, he wrote a memoir of his life which he published in New York that year and dedicated to his English friend, Sir Joseph Banks. Travels and Adventures in Canada and the Indian Territories, between the years 1760 and 1776 has become a Canadian adventure classic and is still considered as one of the best descriptions of Native Indian life at the time of Henry's travels.

"A middle-sized man, easy yet dignified." Henry was known among the Indians and the French as "the handsome Englishman." He never recovered the wealth he had amassed during the height of the fur trade, but is remembered for his accomplishments in society and as one of the most important business leaders who turned Montreal into an innovative centre of business expansion. At age 85, he died at his home on Notre-Dame Street, Montreal, "esteemed by all who knew him."

== Family ==
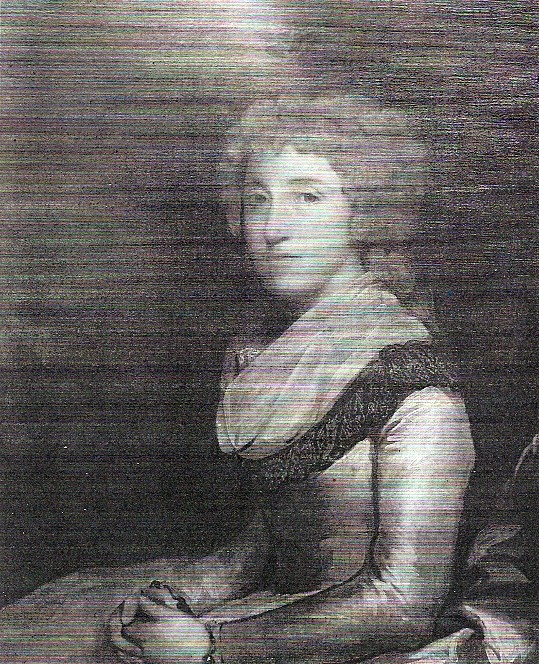
Mrs Julia (born Calcutt) Kittson Henry (1756–1835)

As was the custom with early fur traders, Henry had taken a 'country wife', a Native Indian whose sister was in the same way married to Simon McTavish. By her he was said to have fathered several children, but only one daughter is recorded. In 1785, having by then returned to society at Montreal, he married Julia Calcutt Kittson (1756–1835), "a woman of considerable personal fortitude". She was a native of Limavady and the widow of an Anglo-Irish army officer, John George Kittson (d. 1779), whose home was in County Cork but had seen considerable service in North America. Mrs Julia Henry was the godparent with Sir Isaac Brock of William McGillivray's youngest daughter. It is open to debate whether Julia and Alexander met in Canada, England or Ireland around 1780, but they were the parents of several children, two of whom were born before they were married. Henry was step-father to two Kittsons, and the father of six known children,

- Martha Henry (1777–1849), natural daughter by Henry's country wife. At Albany, New York, 1798, she married William Hallowell (1771–1838), who had purchased his partnership into the North West Company from Henry that year. Their daughter, Elizabeth, married John Bethune, Dean of Montreal.
- Mary Kittson, Henry's stepdaughter, married to John Cates, brother of Lt. Samuel Cates of the King's Royal Rifle Corps whose wife (Mary Tucker) was the sister of Mrs George Kittson.
- George Kittson (1779–1832), Henry's stepson, married Anne Tucker and was the father of several children including Norman Kittson. Their daughter, Margaret, married Henry's business partner in later life, Norman Bethune (1789–1848), son of Rev. John Bethune. Another son, William Henry Kittson, married a sister of Chief Justice Sir William Collis Meredith. Meredith's former business partner at Montreal, Strachan Bethune, was the grandson of George Kittson's sister, Martha (Henry) Hallowell.
- Julia Henry (b.1780), died unmarried.
- William Henry (1784–1864), was a fur trader with the North West Company and later a surveyor and civil engineer at Montreal. He carried several scars from knife wounds received in quarrels with various Indians, and in the Rocky Mountains he had his scalp torn off by a Grizzly bear before being rescued by an Indian. He was inducted into the Beaver Club in 1817. He was married to Jane Doe Felton, sister of The Hon. William Bowman Felton. They had several children including Charles Henry (1832–1897), who ran away from home at the age of thirteen to lead an adventurous life on the seas which included being shipwrecked on one of the islands off Hawaii, for a brief period, where he was married to a native.
- Alexander Henry (1785–1812), not be confused with his first cousin Alexander Henry the younger. He also worked for the North West Company, but was "barbarously murdered" by Native Indians at Fort Nelson near Port Nelson, Manitoba.
- Robert Henry (born after 1785-), wintering partner of the North West Company and director of the Commercial Bank of the Midland District at Cobourg. He was inducted into the Beaver Club in 1815. He married Christine Bethune (1787–1865), daughter of Rev John Bethune.
- John Henry (1786–1787), died an infant. His godparents were Mrs Isaac Todd and Mrs John Gregory, wives of two of the earliest and most prominent partners of the North West Company.
