= Matooskie =

Canadian First Nations woman

Nancy McKenzie
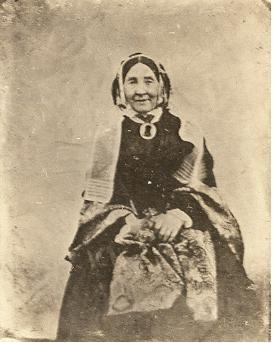
- Photograph of Matooskie (date unknown)
- Born: Matooskie c. 1790; Athabasca Country
- Died: 24 July 1851 (aged 60–61); Fort Victoria, Vancouver Island
- Other names: Matooskie
- Citizenship: Chipewyan
- Spouses: John George McTavish (m. 1813–1830) Pierre Le Blanc (m. 1831; died 1838)
- Father: Roderick Mackenzie

Matooskie, also known as Anne "Nancy" McKenzie (c. 1790 – 24 July 1851), was a First Nations woman of the Chipewyan (Dënesųłı̨né) nation in Canada. The daughter of Scottish-Canadian fur trader Roderick Mackenzie, Matooskie was abandoned by her father as a young girl, and was left in the care of North West Company trader John Stuart. She was later abandoned by her first husband, John George McTavish. Supported by the Hudson's Bay Company, Matooskie and her family moved to various Hudson's Bay outposts across Western Canada, before settling at Fort Vancouver in the Columbia District following the death of her second husband. In the later years before her death in 1851, she accompanied her daughter and son-in-law.

== Early life ==
Matooskie was born c. 1790 to Scottish-Canadian fur trader Roderick Mackenzie and an unknown First Peoples wife taken by Mackenzie during his service for the North West Company (NWC) in the Athabasca Country. Two other children resulted from this common-law marriage. Mackenzie left for Lower Canada in 1801 without Matooskie, placing her and her sister under the care of another NWC fur trader, John Stuart. Stuart and Matooskie eventually moved to the fur-trading district of New Caledonia in what would later become the colony of British Columbia.

== First marriage ==
In 1813, Matooskie married John George McTavish, a partner in the North West Company, à la façon du pays. After the merger of the North West Company with the Hudson's Bay Company in 1821, McTavish assumed the role of chief factor at York Factory.

Her mother achieved unusually high status for a wife married in this manner of European-Native common law marriage and became well-established within the social hierarchy of York Factory.

Matooskie and McTavish had seven daughters together. However, on a visit to Edinburgh in 1830, McTavish abandoned his family to marry Catherine Aitken Turner. George Simpson, an administrator of the Hudson's Bay Company, helped Matooskie and her daughters find refuge at Fort Alexander trading post, under the care of Stuart and her uncle, Donald McKenzie. McKenzie denounced McTavish for his deception and called for significant compensation for Matooskie. It was settled that she was to be given a dowry of £200.

Poor Matooskie is now here and is become in reality, what her name imports, (Note: Meaning "object of pity" in the Chipewyan language (Dënesųłı̨né Yatıé).) she is not only an object of real pity but a picture of wretchedness .... It is not for me to say what could be your aim in discarding her, whom you clasped to your bosom in virgin purity and had for 17 years with you. She was the wife of your choice and has born you seven children, now stigmatized with ignominy ... if with a view of domestick happiness you have thus acted, I fear the aim has been missed and that remorse will be your portion for life .... I will never become your enemy, but ... I am done. She has friends that will not submit to see her suffer ... I think it is as well and that it will be more agreeable to you our correspondence may cease.

— Letter from John Stuart to McTavish following his abandonment of Matooskie.

The abandonment of Matooskie by McTavish was widely condemned, even by those who did not agree with marriage à la façon du pays. Rumours spread among the white settlers that McTavish was abusive and a drunkard. The actions of prominent figures like McTavish and Simpson undermined the legitimacy of marriages à la façon du pays and reduced the status of Indigenous women to that of mistresses. Subsequently, as British wives came to Canada from their home country, there was an increase in racism towards Indigenous women. This was coupled with de-legitimization of marriages between Indigenous women and white fur traders, and attempts to exclude Indigenous women from acceptance into "respectable" society.

== Move and second marriage ==
After McTavish's abandonment, Matooskie was sent by George Simpson to Fort Bas de la Rivière, along with other former "country wives" such as Margaret Taylor. Both received an allowance of £30.

Despite initially not wanting to remarry after her experience with McTavish, Matooskie formally married Pierre Le Blanc, a French Canadian and long-time employee of the Hudson's Bay Company. Le Blanc was in charge of Lower Fort Garry. Matooskie converted to Catholicism and was baptized before marrying Le Blanc on 7 February 1831. In 1838, Le Blanc was assigned to the Columbia District. While stationed there, Matooskie and her family embarked on a crossing of the Rocky Mountains accompanied by two Catholic clergymen: Modeste Demers, and François Norbert Blanchet. On 22 October, a major incident occurred when their boat encountered the dangerous Dalles des Morts (Death Rapids) on the Columbia River. Twelve out of the twenty-six passengers drowned, including Le Blanc and two of the couple's children. Of Matooskie's children, only Grace survived.

Following her second husband's death, Matooskie and her youngest daughter Grace were given shelter at the Hudson's Bay Company's Fort Vancouver. Grace McKenzie married fur trader and steamship captain Charles Dodd in 1842. Matooskie lived with her daughter and son-in-law for the rest of her life, accompanying the Dodds in ferrying supplies to HBC posts across the Columbia District. Matooskie died on 24 July 1851 at Fort Victoria in the Vancouver Island Colony.

== Legacy ==
In 2008, Métis-Canadian feminist scholar Sherry Farrell Racette described her art installation Swept Away: The Story of a Fur Trade Bride, which featured three doll figurines with a river fresco background, and detailed Matooskie's life story. The first doll was Matooskie as a young girl, presented as a potential bride at a trading post ball. The second doll shows Matooskie as the wife of John McTavish, enjoying the privileges associated with her husband's rank and influence. The third doll shows Matooskie's second marriage to the French-Canadian Pierre Le Blanc, where she is seen as unhappy; Racette links this to Matooskie no longer being in the same prestigious social circles as in her marriage to McTavish. Swept Away also portrays the fatal accident on the rapids with three of her children and Le Blanc. Racette wrote that her installation "references specific historic incidents, but also the rivers and events that swept [Matooskie] and thousands of women like her away from their families and home communities into relationships that crossed cultural boundaries and into a world that was continually shifting under their feet".

In June 2023, English professional dancer Kevin Clifton found out he was the great-great-great-great-great-grandson of Matooskie on the British series Who Do You Think You Are?.

== See also ==
- Anglo-Métis – 19th century community of the Métis people of Canada
- Marriage à la façon du pays – Common law marriages between indigenous women and French fur traders in Canada
- Métis people in Canada
- Voyageurs – French Canadians who engaged in the North American fur trade
