= Jean-Baptiste Thibault =

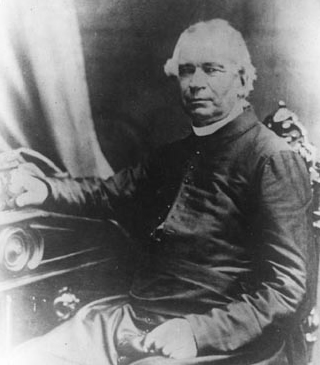
Jean-Baptiste Thibault

Jean-Baptiste Thibault (14 December 1810 – 4 April 1879) was a Roman Catholic priest and missionary noted for his role in negotiating on behalf of the Government of Canada during the Red River Rebellion of 1869–1870. He also established the first Roman Catholic mission in what would become Alberta, at Lac Sainte Anne in 1842.

== Life ==
Thibault was born at Saint-Joseph-de-la-Pointe-de-Lévy 14 December 1810, and studied at the seminary of Quebec. He set out for the Northwest and arrived at Saint-Boniface in June 1833, and began to study the Cree and Chippewa languages. The following September, he was ordained by Bishop Provencher, vicar general of the Northwest for the Archdiocese of Quebec.

Thibault made his first missionary journey in 1842, riding horseback across the plains as far as the Hudson's Bay Company's Edmonton House. He performed baptism and weddings, an acquired a greater knowledge of the area. For the next ten years, he visited HBC outposts, and met with the Indians and Metis. In 1852, he returned to Saint-Boniface. In 1844, he founded the Lac Ste. Anne mission in Alberta. Thibault renamed the lake, previously called "Devil's Lake" in honor of Saint Anne. In 1845 he was made Vicar-General of the Apostolic Vicariate of James Bay. Later in 1846, Thibault furthered his missionary work in travelling to the northern trading post of Île-à-la-Crosse where he noted that the Métis peoples could be easily converted to the Catholic faith. After petitioning the Bishop, Joseph-Norbert Provencher, and gaining the approval of the governor of the Hudson's Bay Company, George Simpson, Thibault was able to arrange for two priests from the superior Oblates of Canada to be sent to build a mission. This mission would be named as the Saint-Jean-Baptiste mission and was in operation from 1845 to 1898.

Thibault was in Quebec in 1869. As he was respected by the Metis, the government asked him to accompany a group heading to the Red River Colony to negotiate a union with Canada. "A reserved and prudent man, Thibault was content to remain in the background" during the mission.
