= Joseph Périnault =

Canadian politician

Joseph Périnault (October 8, 1732 – January 31, 1814) was a fur trader, seigneur and political figure in Lower Canada.

He was born in Montreal in 1732 and worked as a tailor there. With other Montreal merchants, he also invested in the fur trade and took part in fur trading expeditions. In 1765, with Montreal merchant Pierre Foretier, he purchased a large part of the seigneury of Île-Bizard and the sub-fief of Closse, later selling his share to Foretier. Périnault was named a justice of the peace for Montreal district in 1796. In the same year, he was elected to the Legislative Assembly of Lower Canada for Huntingdon County; he was elected in Montreal West in 1800. From 1806 until his death in 1814, Périnault lived with his son, Pierre-Joseph, who was a parish priest at Sault-au-Récollet in north Montreal; he was buried in the parish church.
