= Pierre Foretier =

Canadian fur trader (1738–1815)

Pierre Foretier (January 12, 1738 – December 3, 1815) was a fur trader, seigneur and official in Lower Canada.

He was born in Montreal in 1738, the son of a shoemaker who died when Pierre was nine. He became a merchant supplying goods to fur traders. In 1764, he married Thérèse Legrand, daughter of a Montreal merchant. He owned his own store and operated a store for his father-in-law. He partnered with Joseph Périnault in several fur trading expeditions. In 1765, with Périnault, he purchased a large part of the sub-fief of Closse and the seigneury of Île-Bizard, later buying out his partner and purchasing the remainder of these properties. After 1767, he operated on his own before taking on Jean Orillat as a partner in 1774. Foretier also purchased property in the faubourg Saint-Laurent in Montreal. During the American invasion of 1775–6, he helped supply Canadian forces, despite having his home occupied by an American colonel and his entourage.

He was named a justice of the peace in 1779. Foretier was among those who lobbied for constitutional reform in the province; he ran unsuccessfully for a seat in the legislative assembly in 1792. Foretier later served in the militia, serving as colonel from 1804 until his death at Montreal in 1815.

His daughter Marie-Amable married Denis-Benjamin Viger; his daughter Marie-Élizabeth married judge Louis-Charles Foucher. His grandson Hugues Heney later represented Montreal East in the legislative assembly and served in the province's Executive Council.
