= Joseph Bouchette =

Canadian Surveyor-General (1774–1841)

Lt. Colonel Joseph Bouchette
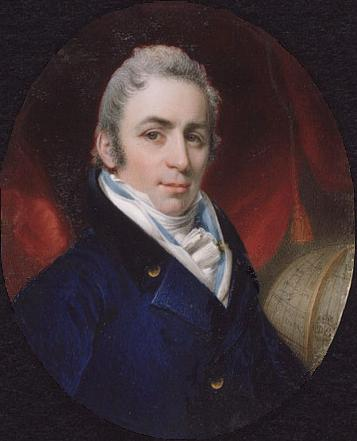

Surveyor-General of British North America
- In office 1804–1839
- Preceded by: Samuel Holland
- Succeeded by: Joseph Bouchette (1800-1881)

Personal details
- Born: May 14, 1774 Quebec City
- Died: April 8, 1841 (aged 66) Montreal, Quebec

Lt.-Colonel Joseph Bouchette (French pronunciation: [ʒozɛf buʃɛt]; May 14, 1774 – April 8, 1841) was the Canadian Surveyor-General of British North America. His book, Topographical Description of the Province of Lower Canada was published at London in 1815 and also translated into French. It contained the sum knowledge of the territory at that time. The township of Bouchette, Quebec, was named for him. During the War of 1812 he raised and commanded the Quebec Volunteers. In 1813, he was gazetted Lt. Colonel on the Staff of Governor-General Sir George Prevost.

== Background ==
Born at Quebec City in 1774, he was the son of Colonel Jean-Baptiste Bouchette, a topographer, and Marie Angelique Duhamel, daughter of Captain Julien Duhamel (1723-1778), of Quebec City. In 1775, his father rescued General Guy Carleton, Commander-in-Chief of the British Forces in North America, by navigating him and his family along the Saint Lawrence River from Montreal, through the American lines, and up to Quebec. This bold move reversed the outcome of the Battle of Quebec (1775), and for his part Joseph's father was handsomely rewarded with nearly 6,000 acres of land and considerable military advancements by the grateful Governor, Sir John Graves Simcoe. Like his father, Joseph Bouchette's career would be marked by a tradition of loyalty and devoted service to his country.

== Early career ==
Bouchette studied art and architecture under François Baillairgé. In 1790, he entered the service of his uncle Samuel Holland, the first Surveyor-General of British North America. The following year he joined his father with the Royal Navy's Provincial Marine on the Great Lakes. In 1793, while serving on Lake Ontario, he came into contact with Governor John Graves Simcoe who commissioned him to make the first survey of the York Harbour, that included making maps of the Toronto Islands. Bouchette, a member of the Royal Canadian Volunteers, remained in York for sometime assisting Augustus Jones with surveying the new provincial capital. Bouchette's proposals for fortifying York as at Quebec City were not heeded, much to his dismay after the Battle of York.

In Autumn, 1793, HMS Onondaga was run aground by a young Lieutenant outside Toronto Harbour and it was feared it could not be salvaged until after winter. After it had been abandoned, Bouchette assumed command and distinguished himself by managing to get it afloat and sailing it back to Niagara-on-the-Lake. For this exploit, the twenty-year-old Bouchette was promoted to 2nd Lieutenant in May, 1794. In 1799, Bouchette was at Halifax studying military tactics under orders from the Duke of Kent, with whom he had become a friend. He returned to Quebec City in 1801 to take up in the offices (which he found in a state of great disorder) of his elderly uncle, Samuel Holland, Surveyor General of The Canadas. Bouchette reorganised the offices and Governor Robert Shore Milnes reported in 1802 that, "Mr. Bouchette has responded perfectly to the opinion which we had formed of him". Following the death of his uncle, Bouchette officially replaced him in August, 1803.

== Surveyor General ==
He served during the War of 1812. He reviewed the territory of Lower Canada for the Government. From 1805 to 1807 he served with Charles Burton Wyatt as interim Surveyor of Upper Canada. In 1815, he published his great book Topographical Description of the province of Lower Canada, which was the sum of knowledge of the territory for that day. The book, complete with some essential maps, was published in London in English and French, and was updated in English only in 1831–1832. His regional maps and two topographical descriptions of Lower Canada are still considered an essential reference for knowledge of the territory.

Bouchette returned to Montreal to become Surveyor General of Lower Canada, replacing his uncle Samuel Holland. After his death in 1841, he was entombed at the Notre Dame des Neiges Cemetery in Montreal.

The Township of Bouchette in Quebec was named in his honour, as well as Bouchette Street in Toronto

== Family ==
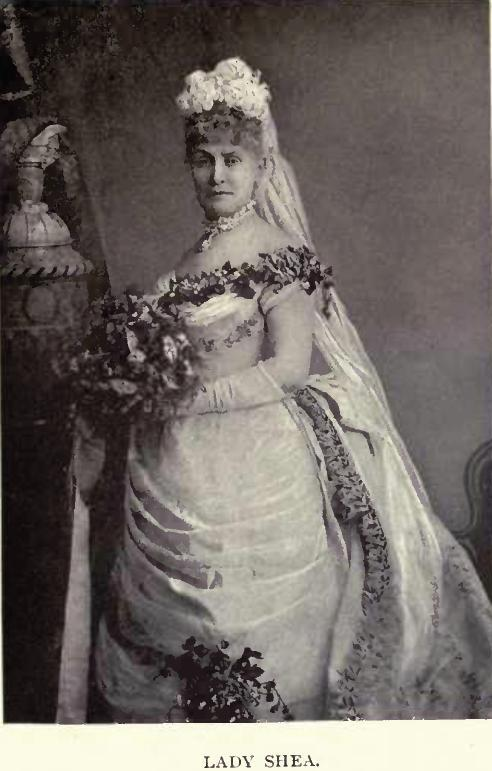
Lady Louisa Shea photographed in the costume by Elliott & Fry worn by her when presented at court

In 1797, at Notre-Dame, Montreal, Joseph Bouchette married Adélaïde Chaboillez (1781-1847), daughter of Charles Chaboillez. Colonel de Longueuil represented the groom's father at the wedding. Through this marriage he became a brother-in-law of Simon McTavish and Roderick Mackenzie of Terrebonne. They were the parents of six children,

- Marguerite-Adelaide Bouchette, died at Quebec, 1803.
- Joseph Bouchette (1800-1881), succeeded his father as Surveyor General. In 1826, he married Margery Elspie Fraser (1806-1854), the eldest daughter of Simon Fraser (c.1760-1839), Seigneur de Sainte-Anne-de-Bellevue and his wife Catherine, sister of William McKay. It while staying with the Frasers that Thomas Moore wrote A Canadian Boat Song. Joseph died at Pont-Rouge.
- Samuel Louis Bouchette (d.1873), became a lawyer and solicitor at Montreal, Quebec.
- Lieut. Jean-Francois Bouchette, of the 63rd Light Infantry, died in Europe.
- Robert Shore Milnes Bouchette (1805-1879), godson of Sir Robert Shore Milnes, Lieutenant Governor of Lower Canada. After travelling in France and Italy, he met Marianne Gardner (1807-1834), granddaughter of Admiral Alan Gardner, 1st Baron Gardner, to whom he was married at Dover in 1834, before she died a few months later. For Robert's part in the Rebellions of 1837 he was exiled to Bermuda, but died at Quebec. He is the ancestor of the Bouchettes of Ottawa, Ontario.
- Louisa Bouchette, was born and educated in Quebec. She married, first, at Quebec, November 8, 1851, Alexander Hart, C E, who died. In 1878, at Quebec, she married second The Hon. Sir Ambrose Shea, Governor of the Bahamas.
