= James McGill =

Scottish-born businessman, politician and philanthropist (1744–1813)

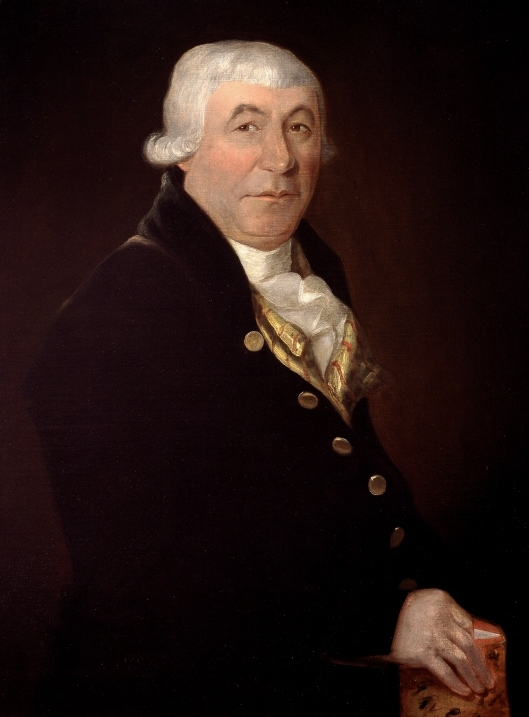
- Portrait c. 1800-1810
- Born: 6 October 1744; Glasgow, Scotland
- Died: 19 December 1813 (aged 69); Montreal, Lower Canada
- Resting place: In front of the Arts Building; 45°30′18″N 73°34′38″W
- Other name: James McGill III
- Citizenship: Lower Canadian
- Education: University of Glasgow
- Known for: Founder of McGill University
- Spouse(s): Charlotte Trottier Desrivières, née Guillimin
- Parent(s): Margaret Gibson, James McGill

James McGill (6 October 1744 – 19 December 1813) was a Scottish-born businessman, politician, slaveholder, and philanthropist best known for being the founder of McGill University in Montreal, Quebec. He was elected to the Legislative Assembly of Lower Canada for Montreal West and appointed to the Executive Council of Lower Canada in 1792. He was an honorary lieutenant colonel of the 1st Battalion, Montreal Militia, a predecessor unit of The Canadian Grenadier Guards. He was also a prominent member of the Château Clique and one of the original founding members of the Beaver Club. His summer home stood within the Golden Square Mile.

McGill was a highly influential and record breaking trader within Canada, specifically in furs. Along with a group of four other merchants, he sent 12 canoes to a port in modern-day Minnesota which "appeared to mark the beginning of large-scale trade" both in the north-west territory of North America and "of the North West Company in Canada". McGill was the largest investor of the fur trade within Lower Canada and Montreal in 1782, with some 26,000 Pound Sterling invested (not adjusted for inflation). It was said by his contemporaries that McGill was "the richest man in Montreal" at the time of his death.

== Life and career ==
The McGill family originated in Ayrshire and had been living in Glasgow for two generations by the time James was born at the family home on Stockwell Street. The McGills were metalworkers and, from 1715 onward, burgesses of the city and members of the Hammermen's Guild, James' father having served as deacon.

James McGill was educated at the University of Glasgow, and soon afterwards left for North America to explore the business opportunities there. By 1766, he was in Montreal, whose trade opportunities had recently been laid open following the British Conquest of New France. He entered the fur trade south of the Great Lakes, at first as a clerk or agent for the Quebec merchant, William Grant of St. Roch. By the next year, the firm of "James McGill & Co." was trading at Michilimackinac.

In 1773, McGill joined with Isaac Todd (who would remain a close lifelong friend) in a trading venture beyond Grand Portage, which was renewed under the name Todd & McGill in 1776. In 1775, McGill (along with Todd, Benjamin, and Joseph Frobisher, and Maurice-Regis Blondeau) sent 12 canoes to a port in Grand Portage (near modern Grand Portage, Minnesota) - this shipment in particular proves important for Canadian history as it (according to historian Harold Adams Innis) "appeared to mark the beginning of large-scale trade to the Northwest (of Canada)...and of the Northwest Company". Grand Portage would be visited by McGill in 1778, the farthest point west that McGill likely travelled to. This partnership was important in the formation of what would become the North West Company. Todd & McGill prospered, as one of the main firms supplied by the London commission merchant, John Strettell. The partnership did not participate in the North West Company after 1783, but it continued in the so-called "Southwest trade" in the Mississippi valley until Michilimackinac was handed over to the Americans in 1796. It was also involved in other enterprises, but few business papers have survived, making a detailed account difficult.

In November 1775, McGill was a member of the representation for the citizens of Montreal at the drafting of the articles of capitulation for the city to the invading American army. McGill was elected to the Legislative Assembly of Lower Canada for Montreal West in 1792 and appointed to the Executive Council in 1792. He was elected again in 1800 and in Montreal East in 1804. He was the first honorary lieutenant-colonel of the 1st Battalion, Montreal Militia, a unit which later evolved into the Canadian Grenadier Guards, as commemorated by the replicated cairn that stands before the Arts building of McGill University.

In 1782, McGill would be responsible with making the largest investment in Lower Canada within the fur trade in history at that time, some 26,000 Pound Sterling.

== Family life and Burnside Place ==
In 1776, James McGill married Marie-Charlotte (1747-1818), the widow of Joseph-Amable Trottier Desrivières (1732-1771). Educated at the Ursuline Convent, Quebec, she was the daughter of Guillaume Guillimin (1713-1750), Member of the Sovereign Council of New France and Judge of the Courts of Admiralty. Her mother, Marie-Geneviève Foucault, was the daughter of François Foucault (1690-1766), the owner of one of the largest seigneuries in New France and a member of the Sovereign Council. McGill had previously adopted Charlotte, the youngest daughter of his deceased friend John Porteous, and through his marriage (after the death of their uncle and legal guardian) he became the step-father of two sons,

- Lt.-Col. François-Amable Trottier Desrivières (1764-1830), J.P., was particularly close to McGill and became like a son to him, following him into business with the firm of McGill & Todd. He married his first cousin, Marguerite-Thérèse Trottier Desrivières-Beaubien. On McGill's death he received £23,000 and a substantial amount of land in Stanbridge.
- Lt. Thomas-Hippolyte Trottier Desrivières (b.1769). McGill purchased a commission for him into the 60th Royal American Regiment, but he predeceased his step-father in a "foolish" duel fought with a fellow German officer while on service in Jamaica. When the German boasted of his death to Desrivières' friend, Charles de Salaberry, after finishing his breakfast, the French-Canadian challenged the German. After a long, obstinate contest fought with swords, the much younger de Salaberry killed the "rough bully" who had murdered his friend. Desrivières had married the sister of Joseph Bouchette and was the father of James McGill Trottier Desrivières, who inherited £60,000 from McGill and married a daughter of Joseph Frobisher.

In 1777, at Montreal, McGill purchased the former home of the Baron de Becancourt for his new family on Notre-Dame Street, next to the Château Ramezay. In about 1797, he was said to have purchased the farm he called Burnside which he used as a summer home. Burnside was near a farm belonging to the Desrivières family to the east, and the McTavish estate to the north and west. A burn ran through the property, from which McGill gave it its name. The land was used for orchards, vegetable farming and cattle-grazing. In 1787, an elm took root in the upper meadow of Burnside which grew into the Founder's Elm and survived until 1976 when it became dangerous and had to be felled.

Burnside was a gentleman's country house as opposed to a working farmhouse. The ground floor was taken up with servants' rooms, with a kitchen at the front and cellars going into the hill at the back. Steps led up to the front door and into the entrance hall with spacious front rooms on either side. Each of the two front rooms had three windows facing south. The high sloping roof had dormer windows for the third floor rooms, of which only two (each measuring twenty four square feet) had ceilings, while the rest of the area was a large open attic.

== Legacy ==
It is noted within McGill patchwork biography that his death was sudden and shocking - even for McGill himself - with "(McGill) having no Idea of his going off half an Hour before he died" on 19 December 1813.

Alexander Henry wrote that McGill's fortune upon his death was "going to strangers...and his wife's children. Mrs. McGill is left comfortable but young Desrivieres (McGill's son) will have 60,000 Pound Sterling".

A fur trader, slaveholder and land owner, McGill further diversified his activities into land speculation and the timber trade. By 1810, he had abandoned the fur trade altogether. At his death, he was one of the richest men in Montreal, leaving an estate well in excess of £100,000. McGill's business contemporaries even mentioned after his death that he may have been "the richest man in Montreal...one who could command more cash than anyone" and it is noted that those contemporaries "savoured the elevated stations (that McGill possessed upon his untimely demise)". The executors of his will were all close personal friends: John Richardson, Bishop John Strachan, Chief Justice James Reid and James Dunlop.

McGill's major assets included real estate in Lower and Upper Canada and investments in Britain; the latter not specified as to character or amount. There were also extensive mortgage holdings. In his will, old friends were remembered, the Montreal poor, the Hôtel-Dieu de Montréal, the Grey Nuns, the Hôpital-Général de Québec and two Glasgow charities. Even though Alexander Henry grumbled that McGill's fortune, "went to strangers... (and) his wife's children, Mrs McGill is left comfortable, but young Desrivières (the son of McGill's youngest stepson) will have £60,000".

McGill's most important legacy was the £10,000 and his summer home that he left to the Royal Institution for the Advancement of Learning. The bequest not only funded McGill University, but it also stretched to establish several other colleges and universities, including the University of British Columbia, which was known as the McGill University College of British Columbia until 1915; the University of Victoria, an affiliated junior college of McGill until 1916; and, Dawson College which began in 1945 as a satellite campus of McGill to absorb the anticipated influx of students after World War II.

James McGill was buried, alongside his fur-trading associate John Porteous, in the old Protestant "Dufferin Square Cemetery". When the cemetery was eradicated in 1875, his remains were reinterred in front of the Arts Building on the McGill University campus. Plaques are displayed on Stockwell Street, Glasgow commemorating his birthplace and his foundation of the university, in the undercroft of Bute Hall at the University of Glasgow, recognizing the historic link between Glasgow and McGill universities and in McGill Metro station, in Montreal.

McGill Street in Montreal is named after McGill. The former McGill Primary School in Pollok, Glasgow, now closed, was named after him as well.

== See also ==
- List of universities named after people
- Scots-Quebecer
