= Jean Orillat =

New France-born merchant in Quebec

- Born: 1733; Barbezieux-Saint-Hilaire, France
- Died: 1779 (aged 45–46); Montreal, Great Britain
- Children: 1 daughter

Jean Orillat (1733 – 1779) was a New France-born merchant in Quebec who was captured by American supporters during the American Revolutionary War.

The son of Jean Orillat and Marie Dupuy, he was born in Barbezieux and came to Canada at a young age. He was involved in the fur trade in the Michilimackinac and La Baye areas and also operated a shop in Montreal. Orillat also lent money and dealt in real estate, lumber and wheat. He operated in partnership with various other merchants, including Pierre Foretier and Jean-Gabriel Cerré.

After the Invasion of Quebec in September 1775 by the United Colonies, some parishes in the Richilieu valley joined the rebels. Orillat was sent by Governor Carleton with an offer of amnesty, but was taken prisoner and brought to Connecticut. He was able to escape in late December of that year and had resumed business by September of the following year.

Orillat was married twice, both times in Montreal: first to Marie-Amable Filiau, dit Dubois in 1761 and then to Thérèse-Amable Viger in 1767.

Orillat died in Montreal. After his death, his estate was left to his daughter Luce-Amable. Her husband Alexis Réaume took over the operation of the business interests, but by 1786, the firm of Rashleigh and Company in London had taken over the operation of the estate.
