= Joseph Howard (cricketer) =

English cricketer

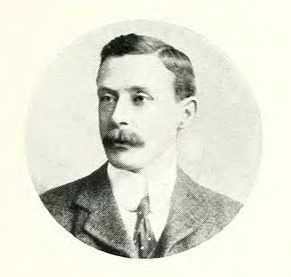

Cricket information
- Batting: Right-handed

Career statistics
Competition	First-class
Matches	5
Runs scored	85
Batting average	8.50
100s/50s	0/0
Top score	28
Catches/stumpings	1/0
- Source: Cricinfo, 7 November 2022

Joseph Howard Jr. (12 January 1871 – 25 January 1951) was an English first-class cricketer, who played five games for Worcestershire at the turn of the twentieth century.

Howard was the son of Joseph Howard, Member of Parliament (MP) for Tottenham, and Ellen Waterhouse.

He made his debut against Yorkshire in May 1900, opening the batting in both innings but making only 0 and 1 as Worcestershire were beaten by an innings and five runs in a very low-scoring game (Worcs 43 & 51; Yorks 99). His highest score of 28 came in his last match, against Marylebone Cricket Club (MCC) in June 1901; this was also the scene of the only catch he took in his career, to dismiss John Rawlin.

Howard was born in Epsom, Surrey; he died at Evenlode House in Gloucestershire at the age of 80.
