= Thomas Frobisher =

English fur trader

Thomas Frobisher (1744 – September 12, 1788) was an English fur trader in Canada.

The son of Joseph Frobisher and Rachel Hargrave, He was born in Yorkshire, England and came to Quebec City in 1769. Frobisher joined his brothers Joseph and Benjamin in the western fur trade. He founded the first trading post at Île-à-la-Crosse in 1776.

He died at Montreal at the age of 44 and was buried in the old Protestant burying ground on Dorchester Street.
