= HMS Frobisher =

Two ships of the Royal Navy have borne the name HMS Frobisher, after the Elizabethan explorer and adventurer Martin Frobisher:

- HMS Frobisher was renamed HMS Parker (1916) in 1915, before being launched the following year as an Improved Marksman-class destroyer leader.
- HMS Frobisher (D81) was a Hawkins-class heavy cruiser launched in 1920. She served in the Second World War and was broken up in 1949.
