= Joseph Howard (fur trader) =

18th-century Canadian fur trader

Joseph Howard (died 5 December 1797 in Berthierville) was born in England and came to Montreal in 1760. He became one of the first English merchants from Montreal to enter the fur trade, an enterprise controlled by the French from that city until the Seven Years' War. One of his partners was George Allsopp and they conducted a substantial trade, much of it unlicensed.

== Biography ==
Joseph Howard arrived in Montreal in 1760. Starting in 1774 and throughout the 1770s, he was trading furs at Michilimackinac. In August 1775, he purchased lands from the Ramezay property on the Yamaska River. In the early 1780s, after being refused its permit to produce furs 3 years in a row, Joseph Howard went bankrupt.
