= William Grant (seigneur) =

Canadian politician

William Grant (June 15, 1744 – October 5, 1805) was a Scottish-born businessman, seigneur and political figure in Lower Canada. He is frequently referred to as William Grant of St. Roch to differentiate him from his many cousins.

== Life ==
Grant was born at Blairfindy, Scotland in 1744, the son of William Grant (d.1762), Laird of Blairfindy, and Jean Tyrie. In 1759, he was hired by a relative, Robert Grant, who was supplying the Royal Navy at Quebec and sent there as an agent of the company. While there, he became involved in other business on his own, including trade in the seal and salmon fisheries, grain and furs. He also acquired property in the province, including land holdings at Saint-Roch, which he was able to have designated a fief; he also purchased the sub-fief of La Mistanguienne (also known as Montplaisir) and the seigneury of Aubert-Gallion. In 1779, he purchased the seigneury of Beaulac and part of Chambly; he later acquired part of Île-d'Anticosti.

He secretly married Marie-Anne-Catherine Fleury Deschambault, widow of Charles-Jacques Le Moyne de Longueuil, 3rd Baron de Longueuil, in the Catholic Church, marrying her publicly in 1770 at the Anglican church in Montreal. Through this marriage, he became associated with the seigneuries of Mingan and Jolliet and property on Île Sainte-Hélène. Mrs Grant's daughter by her first marriage inherited her father's title, becoming the 4th Baroness de Longueuil. Grant arranged a marriage between the Baroness and his nephew, Captain David Alexander Grant (1753-1806) of the 94th Regiment of Foot (1780). The couple were wed in 1781 and their eldest son became the fifth Baron de Longueuil in 1841.

Grant took part in the defence of the town of Quebec during the American invasion of 1775-6 and some of his property was damaged during this period. He was a member of the historical Legislative Council of the Province of Quebec from 1777 to 1791 and served as deputy receiver general from 1777 to 1784. In 1792, he was elected to the 1st Parliament of Lower Canada for the Upper Town of Quebec; he was re-elected in 1796 and 1804. He tended to support the British party in the assembly. In 1805, he was named deputy master of Trinity House at Quebec. He died at Quebec City later that year.
