= Joseph Frobisher =

Canadian politician

The Honourable Joseph Frobisher
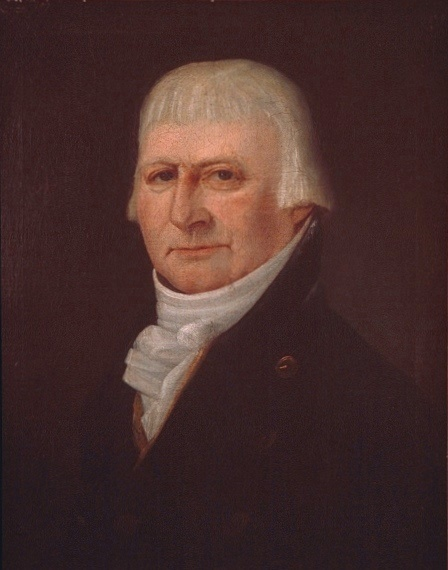
- Born: April 15, 1748; Halifax, Yorkshire
- Died: September 12, 1810 (aged 62); Beaver Hall, Montreal, Quebec, Canada

Joseph Frobisher (April 15, 1748 – September 12, 1810) M.P., J.P., was one of Montreal's most important fur traders. He was elected to the 1st Parliament of Lower Canada and was a seigneur with estates totalling 57,000 acres. He was a founding member of the North West Company and the Beaver Club, of which he was chairman. From 1792, his country seat, Beaver Hall, became a centre of Montreal society.

== Early life ==
Joseph Frobisher was born at Halifax, Yorkshire in 1748. He was the third of five sons born to Joseph Frobisher (1710–1763) and Rachel Hargreaves (1718–1790). The Frobishers were an old Yorkshire family descended from Richard Frobysher of Altofts and Thorne, a first cousin of Sir Martin Frobisher. Joseph's eldest two brothers, Benjamin and Thomas (1744-1788), came to Quebec soon after the British Conquest of New France to enter the fur trade, and Joseph joined them in 1769. They put to use the small capital they had between them to set up a fur trading company based in Montreal, trading in the Northwest Territory.

== Career ==
The brothers worked well together: Benjamin's talents laid in management and he concentrated on running the business with London from Montreal. In stark contrast to Benjamin, Thomas preferred the voyageur lifestyle and was only ever in Montreal briefly. Joseph had a more varied experience, dividing his time between Grand Portage, other posts, and Montreal. When Benjamin died unexpectedly in 1787, as Joseph knew very little at that stage of the management side of the business (and Thomas nothing at all), the two brothers went into partnership with Simon McTavish; both firms being part of the North West Company.

Frobisher was named a justice of the peace in 1788. He was elected to the 1st Parliament of Lower Canada for Montreal East in 1792. Frobisher retired from the company in 1798. He was secretary for the Beaver Club at Montreal. Frobisher was part-owner of the Batiscan Iron Works and, with his partners, purchased the seigneury of Champlain, located on the north shore of St. Lawrence River, near present-day Trois-Rivières. He served in the local militia, becoming major by 1806.

== Beaver Hall ==
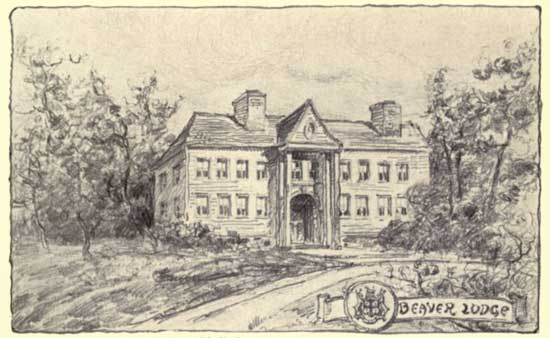
Beaver Hall, built-in 1792 outside the old city walls of Montreal was Frobisher's home until his death in 1810

He had a large townhouse in Montreal on St. Gabriel Street and extensive landholdings throughout Quebec. In 1792, he built his country seat, Beaver Hall, which was one of the early estates of the Golden Square Mile. The wife of Lieutenant Governor Sir John Graves Simcoe observed in her diary that Mrs. Frobisher, "lived in great style and comfort, and had an excellent garden". Since retiring from the fur trade in 1798, the sociable Mr. Frobisher had enjoyed the good life and developed a passion for sumptuous dining to the extent that he kept a diary specifically for recording his dinner parties. His dining room comfortably sat forty guests, and even though he was not in the best of health from 1806, he continued to dine out or entertain in his home every night of the week. He was secretary and chairman of the Beaver Club from 1807 until his death, and they frequently met at Frobisher's home. Frobisher died at Beaver Hall in 1810, and his home succumbed to fire in 1847.

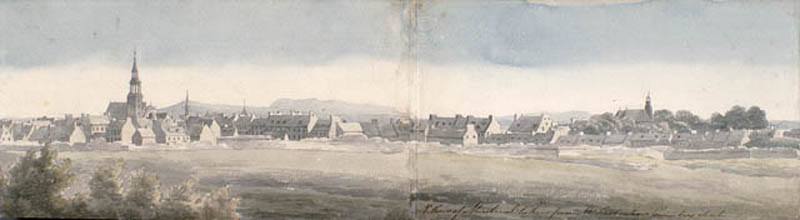
North view of Montreal with its old fortifications, circa 1793, as seen from Joseph Frobisher's country seat, Beaver Hall

== Family and legacy ==
In 1779, at the Anglican service in Montreal, Frobisher married a girl twenty years his junior. She was Charlotte Jobert (1761-1816), daughter of surgeon Jean-Baptiste Jobert and Charlotte Larchevêque. Her aunt, Marguerite Larchevêque (1749-1798), was married to Charles Chaboillez, one of the most influential French Canadian fur traders, who with Frobisher and his brother was one of the founding members of the Beaver Club. They were the parents of fifteen children, but only three lived to adulthood and married:

- (Rachel) Charlotte Frobisher (1780-1801), In 1797, she married Major-General Edward James O'Brien (1772–1855), of the 24th Regiment of Foot. He was the son of James O'Brien (d.1773) M.P., of Ennistymon Castle, County Clare. She died in tragic circumstances and was buried with a monument to her memory at Exeter Cathedral. (O'Brien remarried and his daughter Mary Henrietta married Vice-Admiral Hon. Robert FitzRoy, captain of HMS Beagle during Charles Darwin's famous voyage.)
- Lt.-Col. The Hon. Benjamin Joseph Frobisher, became a partner in the North West Company, was elected to Parliament, and was Aide-de-camp to Lord Dalhousie. In 1804, he married Isabella, daughter of James Grant and Susannah Coffin. She was a niece of The Rt. Hon. Sir William Grant and General Sir Roger Hale Sheaffe 1st Bt. She was a stepdaughter of The Hon. John Craigie and a half-sister of George Hamilton.
- Caroline Frobisher (1798-1843). In 1820, she married James McGill Trottier Desrivières, heir of The Hon. James McGill, his father's stepfather. He was a first cousin of The Hon. Henri Desrivières. They were the parents of one son who died in infancy.

The Frobisher brothers gave their name to the Baffin Island community called Frobisher Bay, which in 1987 was renamed Iqaluit, and is now the capital city of Nunavut territory. The body of water on which sits Iqaluit is still known as Frobisher Bay. There still exists a Frobisher street in Montreal. Beaver Hall Hill is a street which follows the beginning of the path up Rue Belmont to the location of Frobisher's country retreat.
