= Benjamin Frobisher =

Canadian fur trader (1742–1787)

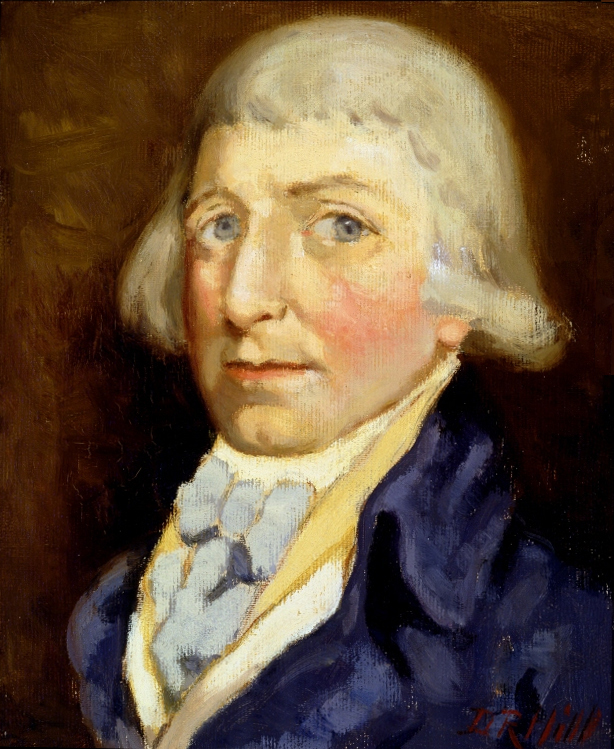
- Born: 1741; Halifax, West Yorkshire
- Died: April 14, 1787 (aged 45–46); Montreal, Quebec, Province of Quebec
- Known for: Leading Montreal fur trader and founding member of the Beaver Club.

Benjamin Frobisher (1741 – April 14, 1787) was born in England, the son of Joseph Frobisher and Rachel Hargrave and immigrated to Canada about 1763. Two brothers also immigrated to Canada and all three were involved with the fur trade and its expansion into the northwest.

In 1770, the three brothers, partnered with Richard Dobie, had a successful fur trading expedition which went up the Saskatchewan River well past Fort Bourbon situated near the mouth of that river. More successful expeditions followed and in 1779 the Frobishers set up a company that owned two of the sixteen shares in the North West Company established that year. They were among the shareholders who got their fur trade goods from the London merchant John Strettell.

At the time of Benjamin's death, the northwest was beginning to be the most important region in the fur trade and a time when the North West Company was on the point of having almost total control of the area's trade. He was one of the seventeen original founding members of the Beaver Club.
