= Simon McGillivray =

Canadian businessman (c. 1785 – 1840)

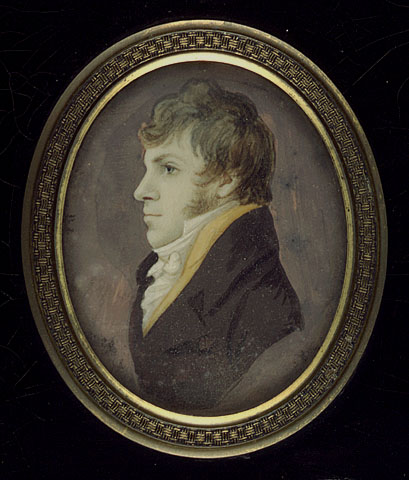
- Courtesy of the Library & Archives Canada
- Born: 1785; Dunlichty, Inverness-shire. Scotland
- Died: 9 June 1840 (aged 54–55); Blackheath, Kent, England

Simon McGillivray, FRS (c. 1785 – 9 June 1840), played an intricate role in merging the family owned North West Company with the rival Hudson's Bay Company. From 1835, he co-owned the Morning Chronicle and the London Advertiser. He was Provincial Grand Master of Upper Canada (1822–1840); Fellow of the Royal Society at London; a member of the Beaver Club at Montreal and a member of the Canada Club at London.

== Early years ==
In 1785, McGillivray was born at Dunlichity, near Daviot in the Scottish Highlands. He was the youngest son of Donald Roy McGillivray (1741–1803), tacksman of Achnalodan in Dunmaglass and later of Dalscoilt in Strathnairn. His mother, Anne (1740–1807), was the daughter of Lieutenant John McTavish (1701–1774), of Garthbeg. The McGillivrays had traditionally held the Dunmaglass estate since the fourteenth century, and Simon's grandfather was a first cousin of the Chief of Clan McGillivray, Captain William McGillivray of Dunmaglass. However, on his side of the family, the land had dissipated so that Simon's father was a small tenant on what had become part of the Lovat estate, and he was unable to provide secondary schooling for Simon and his brothers William and Duncan. Instead, their education was paid for by their wealthy uncle Simon McTavish, of Montreal, who also provided each of the boys with careers within his fur trading empire.

== Representing the family firm in London ==
Simon McGillivray had a lame foot and was slightly blind in one eye, so instead of coming to the Canadas and being put through an apprenticeship with the North West Company as his brothers had, he was sent down to London to work for another branch of his uncle's business, McTavish, Fraser & Co. This company was set up to maximise profits for the Montreal firm. The company supplied the Canadian firm with trade goods, obtained credit for it, looked after shipments and sold the pelts at the best price on the London market.

He became a partner of the firm in 1805 and in 1811 he was made a partner of the parent company in Montreal, McTavish, McGillivrays & Co. From London, Simon worked closely with his brother, William McGillivray, in his struggles to overcome Lord Selkirk and the Hudson's Bay Company. He made various business trips to Montreal when needed but otherwise remained in London where his authority had steadily grown to supersede his cousin John Fraser, the financial expert in Simon McTavish's time.

== Merging the NWC with the HBC ==
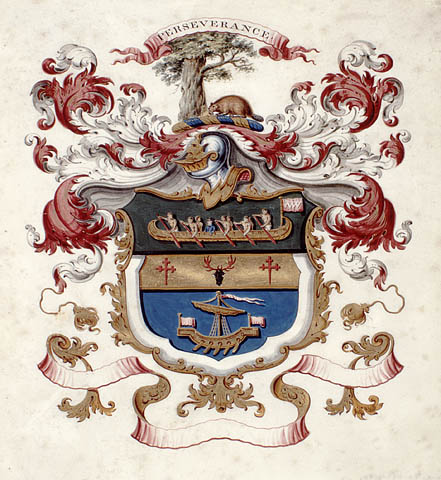
North West Company – Coat of Arms

In 1820, when William McGillivray realised that the collapse of the North West Company (NWC) was imminent unless an agreement could be made with their rivals, the Hudson's Bay Company (HBC), Simon took a leading role. Together with his friend Edward Ellice, they devised a plan to merge the two giant fur companies. During the discussions that followed, Colin Robertson remarked: "I like Simon much better than his friend the Member of Parliament (Ellice); there is a sort of highland pride and frankness about the little fellow that I don't dislike". The merger was completed by 1821, and having broken the news to the partners in Canada, Robertson again commented, "Simon McGillivray has carried everything without even the semblance of opposition. The first day he opened the business, the second the Deed and Release was signed, and the third all was peace and harmony".

Simon and William were placed on the board of the new organisation after investing £164,000 between them, but the peace did not last long and by 1825 their Montreal and London firms, McTavish, McGillivrays & Co., and (since 1822) McGillivrays, Thain & Co. went bankrupt. They were left in debt to the sum of £200,000. Blame for the failure is generally accredited to the dealings of the Ellice family, who since the American Revolution had made ambitions on gaining control of the riches in North West Canada.

== Family and final years ==
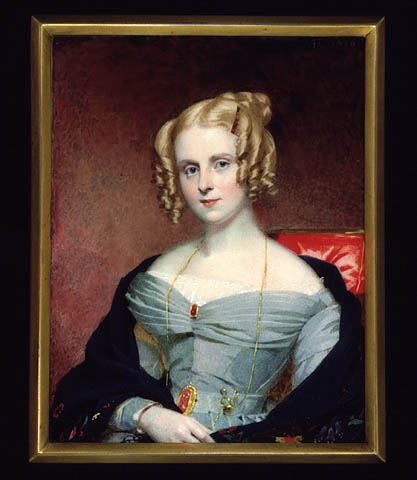
Anne (Easthope) McGillivray (1808–1869), 1838. Courtesy of Library and Archives Canada

McGillivray was forced to sell his valuable art collection, but his talents had not gone unnoticed in London and his career continued to prosper. In 1829, Simon was chosen by the United Mexican Mining Association of London to go to Mexico to help reorganise the administration of the company's silver mines. In 1835, he was back in London, becoming a co-owner of the Morning Chronicle and London Advertiser. A Freemason in London, from 1822 he held the position of Provincial Grand Master of Upper Canada, a position he held until his death. In 1838, he was elected a Fellow of the Royal Society.

In 1837, at London, he married Anne Easthope (1808–1869), the eldest daughter of his business partner Sir John Easthope, 1st Bt., M.P., of Firgrove, Surrey, by his first wife, Ann, daughter of Jacob Stokes, of Leopard House, Worcestershire. The McGillivrays kept two houses. Their London home was at 13 Salisbury Street, The Strand, and they also kept a residence on Dartmouth Row, Blackheath, which was then in Kent. Simon was the godfather of John Auldjo. The McGillivrays were the parents of two daughters, and they were survived by one.

- Mary Louisa McGillivray (1840–1897), married Rear-Admiral Richard Dawkins (1828–1896), of Stoke Gabriel, Devon. They were the parents of five children, including Richard MacGillivray Dawkins.
