= Clan MacPhail =

Highland Scottish clan

- Conchie Dhu or Condochy Doye
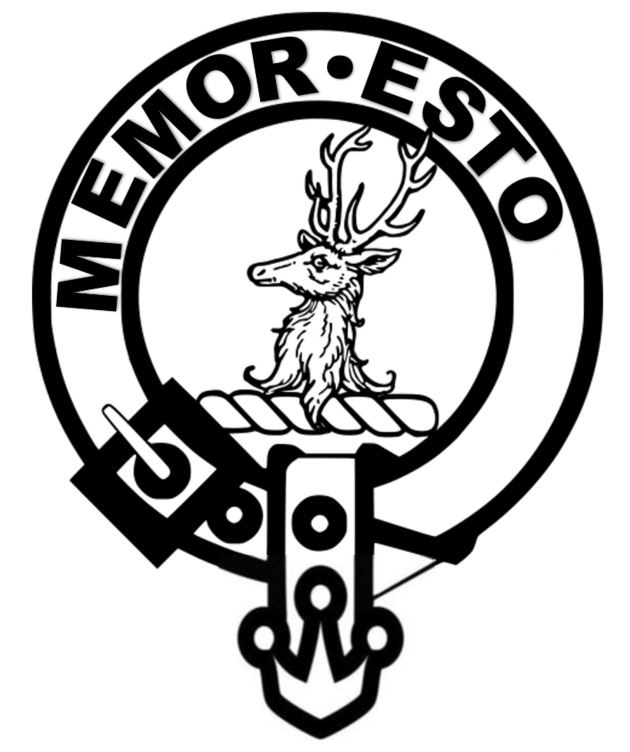
- Crest: A stag salient
- Motto: "Memor Esto" (Be Mindful)

Profile
- Region: Highland
- District: Inverness
- Plant badge: Red whortleberry, bearberry,
- Animal: Stag
- Pipe music: The MacPhail's Banner (by Allan W.R. McBean)
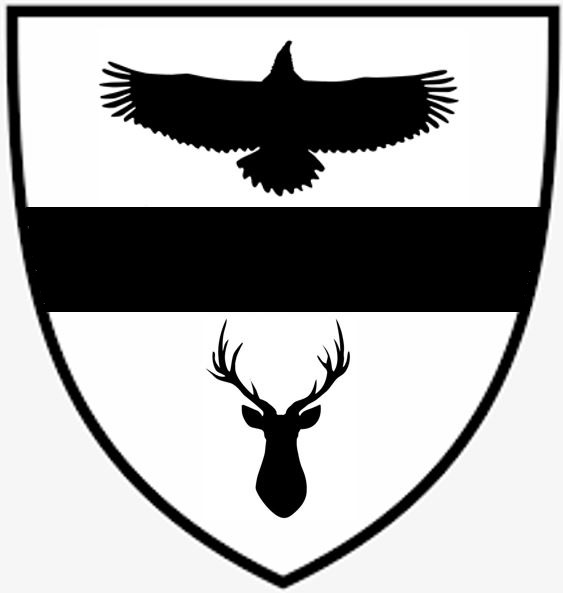
- Clan MacPhail no longer has a chief, and is an armigerous clan
- Seat: Inverernie, (Gaelic: At the mouth of, fearn, alder wood. At the mouth of the alder burn.)
- Last Chief: Paul MacPhail
- Died: early 1900s
Septs of Clan MacPhail
*Standard Variants: MacPhail, McPhail, MacPhaul, MacPhayll, McPhaul *Phonetic Shifts: MacFall, McFall, MacFaul, McFell *Gaelic-influenced: MacVail, MacVaill, MacVaaile, MacVale *Anglicized Drops: Paul, Paull *Regional Transitions: MacKail, MacKell
Allied clans
Chattan Confederation
Clan Mackintosh
Clan MacPherson
Clan MacBean
Clan Shaw of Tordarroch
Clan Farquharson
Clan MacThomas
Clan MacGillivray
Clan Davidson
Clan MacQueen
MacIntyres of Badenoch
MacLeans of the North
Rival clans
Clan Comyn
Clan Ranald
Clan Rose

Clan MacPhail or the Sons of Paul is a Scottish clan of the Scottish Highlands. Known in Scottish Gaelic as Conchie Dhu or Condochy Doye, the clan is mainly associated with the confederation of Clan Chattan.

== History ==
=== Origins ===
The original Gaelic name of this clan was Conchie Dhu or Condochy Doye.

=== With the Clan Chattan Confederation ===
The MacPhails were always considered to be of old Clan Chattan stock and closely related to MacPhersons, MacBeans and other Cattanach families that together formed the Clan Chattan Confederation. Cattanach is still a surname associated to these clans.

==== As Clan MacPhail proper ====
Originally the MacPhails had a stronghold until 1291 at Fassfern about 16 kilometers west of Fort William. A Paul Conchie Dhu is reputed to have accompanied others of the Clan Chattan on their migration from Lochaber to Strathnairn during the time of Angus, 6th chief of Mackintosh who had married Eva, the heiress of Clan Chattan. Some of the first MacPhails are reputed to have been descended from a Paul Cattanach.

MacPhails, or Son of Paul, are mentioned early in the Kinrara manuscript stating that a Paul Gow MacPhail, "good sir" lived in the time of Duncan, 11th of MacKintosh. The term "good sir" was a custom mainly related to addressing clergymen.

When the Chief of Clan MacKintosh, Angus, married the heiress of Clan Chattan in the 13th century, the majority of the Chattan families including most of Clan MacPhail moved to eastern Inverness-shire.

In 1414, the name appears in a Retour of Inquest on Donald Thane of Calder's succession to the lands of Dunmaglass, Gillemore M'Phale being one of the inquest.

In 1547, a MacPhail, Duncan Makconquhy Dow leased half the towns of Tullich and Elrick. This lease was inherited through generations.

In 1566, an Andrew MacPhail is described in the Burgh Court Book as "minister of Inverness and Petty in the Erse/(Gaelic) tongue".

In 1595, Andrew M'Phail, minister at the Kirk of Croy and Findla MakPhail, one of the beillis of Inverness appear in a contract between the magistrates of Inverness and a Robert Waus.

In 1631, another MacPhail entered into a long lease to Invernarnie with the Laird of Kilravock. For 1000 Pound Scots he was granted a wadset and long tack of Invernarnie, which faced the river Nairn and lay within the Barony of Strathnairn in the Parish of Daviot and Dunlichty. The land also included Duglass and Dullatur facing the river Findhorn. These lands were held by descendants until 1773, when the lease was not renewed. The unity of the family was destroyed and a large portion drifted southward to Argyllshire and were largely absorbed into urban life.

In 1662, records from Inverness show debt from failed business agreements resulted in a public horning issued against a Duncan MacPhail and again in 1669 against his son Paul and his business partner Alexander Shaw of Tordarroch.

A number of Clan Chattan bonds however signed through the 17th and 18th centuries continued to have MacPhail signatures still indicating their stature in the Confederation.

Some of the Clan MacPhail chiefs included:

- Duncan MakDonequhy Dow MacPhail in 1546
- Paul MacPhail in 1689
- Robert MacPhail in 1721
- Alexander MacPhail in 1743

The MacPhails of Inverernie in the Strathnairn and the Shaws of Tordarroch buried their dead for generations in an enclosure adjoining the east wall of Dunlichty Kirk.

The last lineal MacPhail chief, Paul MacPhail died in Australia in the early 1900s.

===== Conflicts and Feuds =====
As an integrated clan of the Chattan Confederation, Clan MacPhail was obligated to answer the call of the superior Mackintosh Chief. More information on this aspect can be found on the Clan Chattan and Clan Mackintosh pages.

MacPhails were also involved individually in other conflicts. For example, around 1627, a Johne M'Phale of Inverness was recruited as an archer for Captain Alexander M'Naughtan in service of King Charles the 1st to support Protestants in France.

Several MacPhails were officers in the Mackintosh/Clan Chattan regiment in the '15. The heir to the MacPhail Chieftainship, was apparently deported to Virginia following his surrender after the Battle of Preston but died on board the ship.

A MacPhail of the '45 was evidently the last person to shake hands with Prince Charles Edward Stuart and to his death he never greeted anyone else with that hand. The muster roll of Charles' army lists 2 Macphails:

- John MacPhail from Draches Mor who fought in Lady Macintosh's Regiment at Falkirk Muir & Culloden
- Malcolm MacPhail from Elgol who fought with the Macintoshes/Keppochs. This regiment fought in all 3 major battles.

An auction of household goods of the Late Sir William Fraser and others in 1898 at Dowell's Auction House in Edinburgh presented a basket hilted sword said to have belonged to a MacPhail who had fought at Culloden, had been kept by his daughter Bell who eventually had sold it to Fraser. This sword is now in the collection of the Battle of Falkirk Muir Trust. Dr Charles Mackintosh of Drummond mentions in his Antiquarian Notes no 96 that when he lived in Gollanfield, in Petty, an old man of ninety known as John Oig told him he had known a Paul MacPhail of Ballenreich, who the day after the Battle of Culloden helped to dig a trench where many of the dead were interred and had known the man who had escaped with the Clan banner, which was the only one in the prince's army that did not fall in the enemy's hands. All the rest were burned by the common hangman in Edinburgh.

Another MacPhail, Hugh MacPhail of Strathglass is also recorded to have fought at Culloden and was apparently one of several men of Glenmoriston who sheltered the Prince after the battle. His sword has ended up on display in the Inverness Town House on the right side of the main stained glass windows. The sword is sometimes described as a Andrew Ferrara sword, a sword maker of esteemed renown.

Records also exist of the atrocities committed after the battle of which some MacPhails were victim to: "A woman brought to bed, Sunday before the battle, was Elspet MacPhail, in Gask; her husband is Donald MacIntosh, had her child born on the Sunday, who was called Alexander, of which one of the Dragoons took by the leg or thigh, and threw it about his hand, not head."

===== Clan Symbols =====
Members of Clan MacPhail are entitled to wear a crest badge to show their allegiance to their clan chief. This crest badge contains the heraldic crest and heraldic motto of the clan chief. For Clan MacPhail, it is a Stag Salient. These elements, like the chief's coat of arms, are the heraldic property of the chief alone. The symbolism of Clan MacPhail is distinct from the majority of the Chattan Federation having no wildcat, but a stag. The most similar to this is with Clan Davidson, their close neighbours to the north. The Davidsons appears to have changed their crest to honour an important marriage to a Mackenzie of Gairloch and the MacPhails could have done something similar. The use of the stag with certain clans could also represent an association with the cult of Saint Giles.

Clan badges are usually worn on a tam o' shanter or attached at the shoulder of a lady's tartan sash.

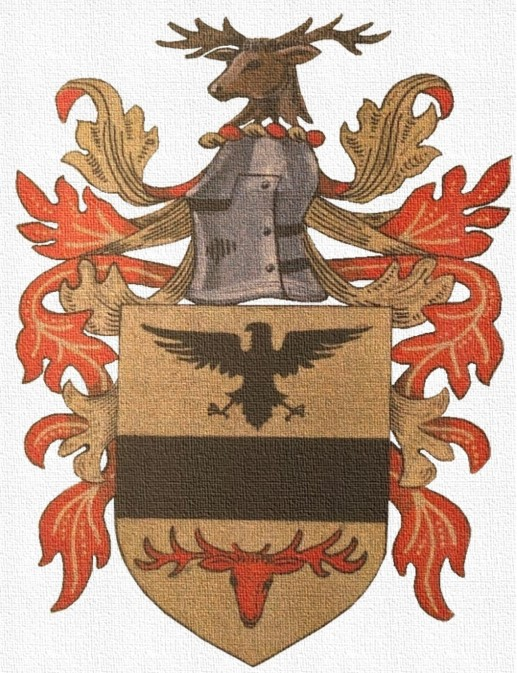
The Arms of the Clan MacPhail Chief.

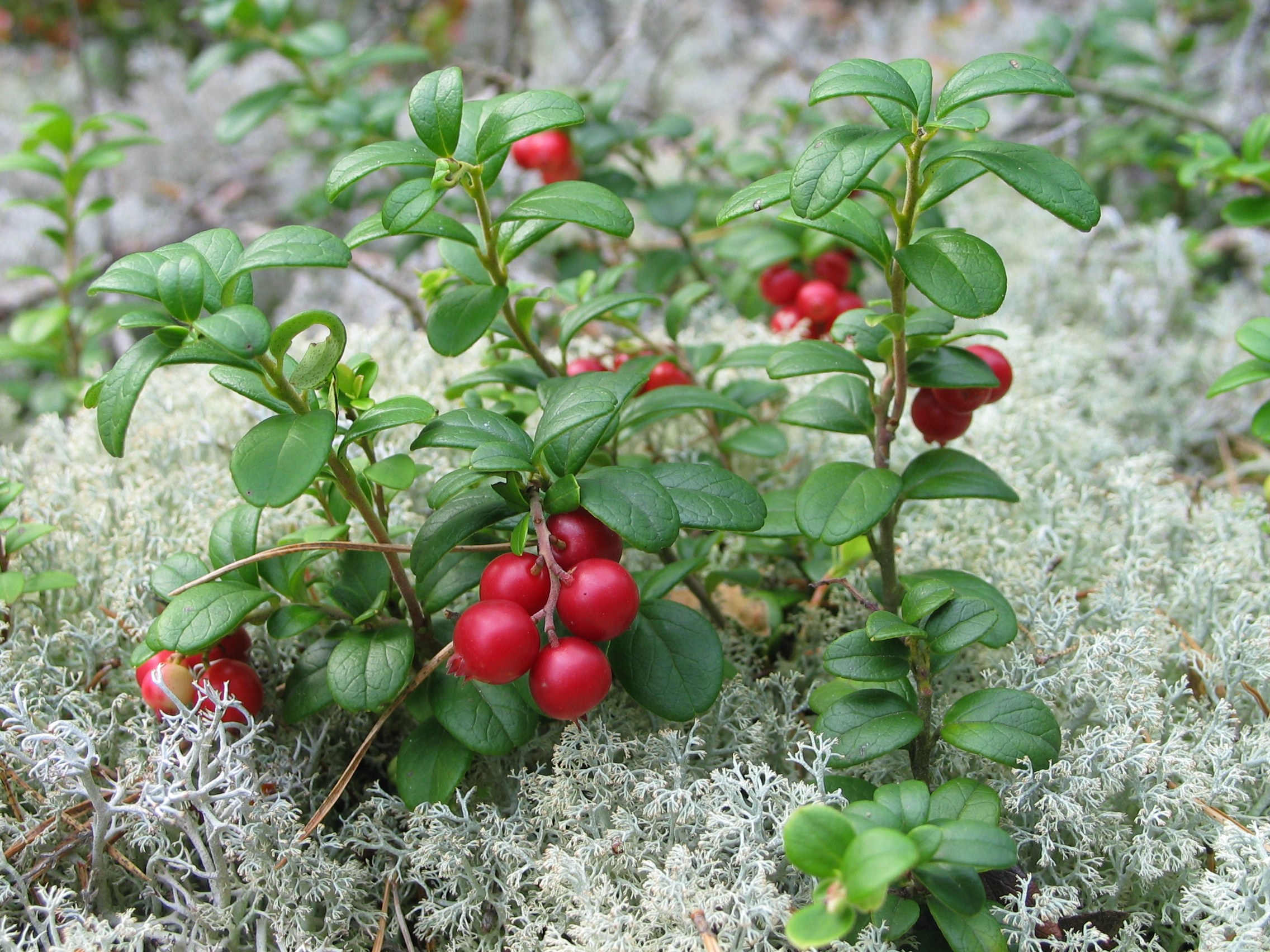
Red Whortleberry: plant badge of Clan MacPhail.

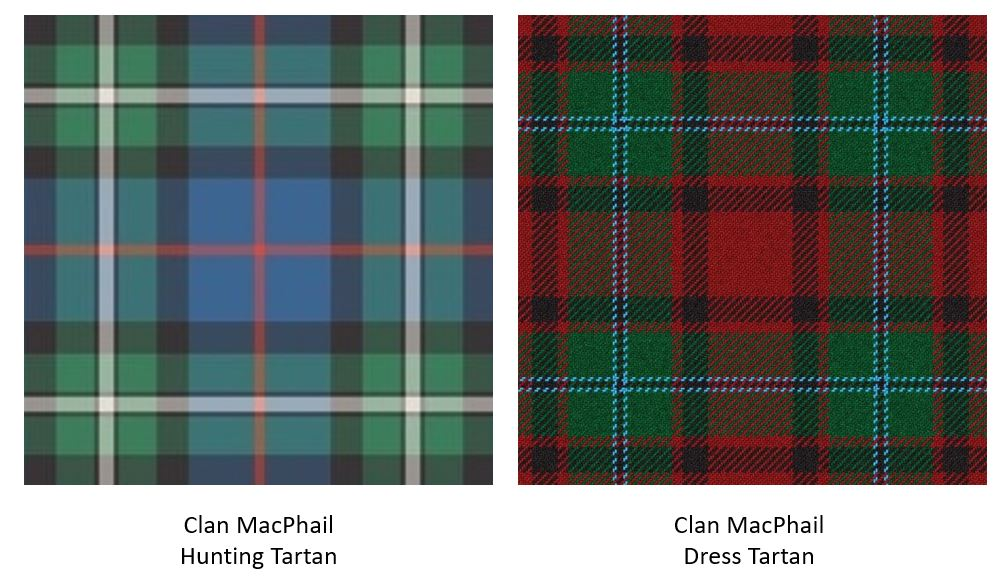
Clan MacPhail various tartans

====== Selection of a new Chief ======
In 2022, the clan has started the process to select a commander.

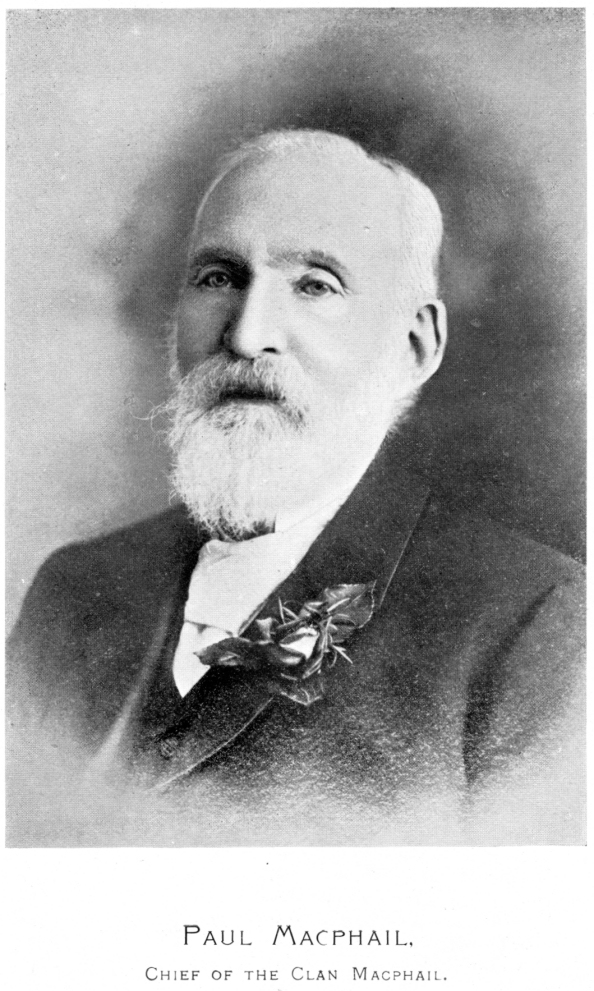
Paul MacPhail, Chief of Clan MacPhail circa 1910

===== Close association with Clan MacKintosh =====
Since the 15th century, Clan MacPhail was found mainly in the lands of Inverernie about 8 km west of Loch Moy, near the ancestral home of the MackIntoshes.

In 1490, a Donald MacPhail witnessed a bond between the Lairds of Mackintosh and Kilravock and two years later between Mackintosh and the Dunbars. This MacPhail is identified as a tenant of Dullatur according to the Exchequer Rolls of Scotland.

One of the earliest recorded MacPhail, a certain Gillies MacPhail married a Margaret Macintosh in 1500. There was several other MacPhails that intermarried with MacKintoshes showing a close fraternity.

A Anndra MacPhail, the parson of Croy wrote the history of the MacKintoshes down to the murder of the 15th chief in 1550 and that document has come to be known as the Croy Manuscript.

In 1708, a Coll MacDonell wrote to Paul MacPhail, who was the Chamberlain to the Laird of MacKintosh, explaining why he couldn't pay his rent, that had been due in 1707 and 1708, asking for relief.

===== Close association with Clan MacBean =====
The MacPhail surname was also found with their neighbors and close relatives of Clan MacBean:

- In 1490, Donald MacPhail of Clan MacBean witnessed a band between the lairds of MacIntosh and Kilravock.
- In 1609, Angus MacPhail in Kinkell signed the Band of Union on behalf of Clan MacBean and as laird of Kinchyle in the Valuation Roll of 1644.

=== Other Clans with smaller MacPhail Families ===
Other Clans also have small smatterings of MacPhails.

==== The other MacPhails of the East ====
===== In the Lands of Clan Grant =====
Records show Johannes McFaill was a parishioner in Duthil. Gillepatrik McFale lived in Glenurquhart in 1545. Duncan McFaill was a reader at Cromdale in 1584. Other variants of the name were noted later in Invera’en, Cromdale, Abernethy and Aberlour.

==== The MacPhails that stayed in West ====
===== With Clan Cameron =====
The remnants of Clan MacPhail that stayed in the west and did not migrate with Clan Chattan/MackIntosh in the 13th century, eventually integrated with Clan Cameron. Clan Cameron tradition has it that the MacPhails and MacBeans are MacGillonies in origin who eventually became the Camerons of Strone, one of the four branches of this clan. MacGillonies is thought to be from the Gaelic "Mac Gille 'an fhaidh"/"Mael an' fhaidh," meaning "son of the servant of the prophet." These MacPhails appear to have lived on Loch Eil at Fassfern and some were cited for cattle raiding with a Ewen Cameron on the Register of the Privy Council in 1547.

Variations on the name found with Clan Cameron include: MacKail, MacKell, MacPhail, MacVail, MacVaaile, MacVaill, MacVale and Paul.

===== With Clan MacDonell of Glengarry =====
Some of the remaining Lochaber MacPhails also became a sept of Clan MacDonell of Glengarry and were mainly settled around Laroche. A well known MacPhail from this group was Big Archibald MacPhail, a cattle drover, who attacked a group of Campbells near the village of Killin in 1646. The Dewar Manuscripts Vol.1 which contains Gaelic folktales includes the life of Big Archibald MacPhail.

Another Archibald MacPhail fell foul of Coil MacDonell who was authorized to regulate fishing in the local lochs. In 1809, a letter to officials at Inverness he states: "I have sent to you with Sergeant Donald Macdonell, one Archibald MacPhail to jail at Inverness. He ought at least to be banished to Botany Bay, or to send him on board one of Her Majesty's ships, which last punishment is too good for him".

Families of MacPhails were found throughout the West Highlands and Islands, including Glengarry, Glencoe, North Uist, Islay and Kintyre.

===== In the lands of Clan Campbell =====
The MacPhails were always associated with Ardchattan Priory which had been originally founded by Duncan MacDougall of Lorn. At least one monk was named MacPhail. The signature of David MacPhail is found on a number of monastic documents between 1552 and 1564, some of which are also signed by Sir John MacPhail, rector or parson of nearby Kilnynvir. There is also references to MacPhails being hereditary physicians to the MacDougalls.

The records of the Thane of Cawdor state that:

- In 1533, a Sir John Mcfaell, a pope's knight, witnessed a bond of Manrent.
- "At the Arde on 14 February 1570, it was agreed and finalized between the honourable man John Campbell of Calder and his heirs that John Mcfaill, parson of Kilnynvir, John Mcfaill vicar of Kilmaille, Angus Mcfaill, Ewin Gillicallum, Iwir Sonnies and Dugall Mcfaill brother to the said John and their offspring become perpetual men to the said John Campbell of Calder and his heirs."

Various MacPhails are also recorded in Campbell lands in the 17th and 18th century, apparently in one incident, after an argument with their neighbors, Macleans, moved inland to Argyll and Glenlyon. e.g. John MacPhail in Auchauaich around 1691. MacPhails were mainly found in a narrow gorge between Loch Awe and Loch Etive, with a few becoming ship wrights. The ferry from Portachoillan was run by Malcolm MacPhail from about 1800, then by his son John MacPhail from 1830 to 1860, then by his sons Neil and John. Several MacPhails were among the fencible men enrolled in Glen Lyon by the Duke of Atholl in 1706.

=== Separate and Distinct Lines ===
==== With Clan Mackay ====
A sept of the Clan Mackay by the surname of Polson who are also known as Siol Phail are, according to Sir Robert Gordon, 1st Baronet, descended from Neil, son of Neil, son of Donald Mackay, 5th of Strathnaver, chief of Clan Mackay. Although one of their ancestors, Neil Neilson Mackay, died fighting against his own Strathnaver kinsmen at the Battle of Drumnacoub in 1433, the Polsons later gravitated back towards their Strathnaver kindred.

In 1497, 1506, and 1511, Sir John Polson who was presbyter and later chanter of Caithness acted for Iye Roy Mackay, 10th of Strathnaver.

At the Battle of Torran Du in 1517, the Polsons supported the Clan Mackay against the Murrays of Aberscross. In a list of men in Sutherland capable of carrying arms during the Jacobite rising of 1745, a number of Polsons appear in the parishes of Loth and Kildonan. However, according to historian Angus Mackay writing in 1906, the sept was no longer numerically strong and many of them had adopted the surname MacPhail or were now signing themselves as Mackay.

==== With Clan Macleod of Lewis ====
Late 18th century Clan MacLeod tradition has it that MacPhails in their lands are descendants of Páll, son of Bálki, or Paal Baalkeson, His name appears as Pol filius Boke in the medieval Chronicle of Mann and as Paal Baccas in the 19th century Bannatyne manuscript; a 13th-century Hebridean lord who was an ally of Olaf the Black, king of Mann and the Isles. The Bannatyne manuscript states that Paal Baccas had a natural son, from whom descended a family that held the island of Berneray and other lands on Harris under the MacLeods. Matheson proposed that the MacPhails, originally from the Sand district on North Uist, and those from Carloway on Lewis, derived their surname from Páll. There is a township on the northern tip of the Island called Baile Mhicphail (Macphail's village).

A group of sea crags called the Flannan Isles off the Isle of Lewis was regarded as a refuge of sanctity, as well as being a rich source of seabirds. On Maol nam Both, are found two stone beehive houses named, the MacPhail bothies, which are said to be the remains of two monks' cells, part of a small early Celtic monastic settlement.

Donald MacDonald, in his book Tales and Traditions of the Lewis, dedicates a short chapter to the MacPhails of Lewis. "The MacPhails made their power felt throughout the ages, and we find that they were used as wardens by the MacLeods of Lewis and placed along the west coast...to prevent the Macaulays of Uig from passing north to raid the Morrison territory".

=== Other Gaelic Derivatives ===
==== Irish Derivatives ====
McFall, McFaul and McPhails records are found clustered in Ulster especially around County Antrim and Derry.They appear to date from the British Plantation period. These variants are in church registers of County Antrim. As an example, on 29 August 1824, Sarah Jane, daughter of William McFaul, was christened at Ballymena in that county.

The Hearth Money Roll of 1669 for the baronies of Cary, Dunluce, Kilconway, Toome, Antrim and Gelnarm in County Antrim also lists Macffall, McPhall, McPhall, Maiklefall and Paule in the parishes of Ballclug, Racavan, Rashee, Ballintoy, Layd and Rasharkin.

Other derivations found include MacPhóil, MacPóil, MacPaul, MacVail, Vail, Paulson, Polson and Powlson

==== Manx Derivatives (no known connection) ====
MacPhaayl, Maelfabhail; From the book, Manx Names of 1890 by Arthur William Moore: "Phail is Anglicised from Maelfabhail. Maelfabhail, son of Muircheartach, slain by the Norsemen"

=== Additional Complexities ===
- Mac and Mc prefixes were also dropped by many Highland Gaelic families as they moved south to urban areas such as Glasgow and Edinburgh in their attempts to try to fit in. There was a level of discrimination especially in the aftermath of the Jacobite Rebellion where the more anglicized south had largely supported the government. MacPhail became Phail or even Paul.
- The derived surnames Paul and Paull was also one of antiquity in various parishes such as Daviot, Inverness-shire and Fintry, Stirlingshire. In 1654, it was also found in the Lothians and in Fife. Examples include John Paul from 1438, a "magister machinarum dominini regis", a Master of the King's machines which translates as either an engineer or the person who looked after the Kings ordnance (artillery) and is recorded in the Scottish Exchequer Rolls of having received two payments of £6/13s/4d for services rendered. Others include Robert Paule, a member of the council of the burgh of Stirling in 1528. John C. Paull in 1530, a sheriff of Dunbarton, Patrick Paule, witness at Tuliboil in 1546, Janet Paule in Edinburgh in 1659, Alexander Paull, mercator in Elgin in 1696. A John and William Paul are also listed as prisoners of war after the Battle of Dunbar (1650) as having been captured by Cromwell's forces and were eventually transported as Indentured labour to the Plymouth Colony. Pauls are also recorded in the Glasgow area by the 17th century, from High Kirk Baptisms and the Ramshorn Cemetery include Elizabeth Paul of 1609 and Agness Paul of 1774. The most famous Paul must be John Paul Jones born 6 July 1747, Kirkbean, Kirkcudbright and is considered the founding father of the American Navy.
- Not all Scottish Paul families however can trace their origins to Gaelic or Highland clan origins. Some Pauls around the Glasgow area appear to have a Flemish origin. A John Paul, arrived around 1512 to manufacture garments for the Scottish Court of James IV.
- Numerous MacPhail families migrated or were transported during the Highland Clearances to the colonies of America and Australia and their records have become difficult to trace. One such example where a Macdonald laird determined to evict about 600 persons from Sollas, in North Uist and forcibly emigrate them to Canada. Notices of ejectment were served with effect for 15 May 1849. Their goods were attached. Many were turned out of their houses, doors locked, and everything they possessed cattle, crops, and peats seized, whilst furniture was thrown out of doors. The season was however already too late to travel to Canada. They naturally rebelled. A MacPhail was arrested who obstructed the evictors and marched off to Lochmaddy by the police. His wife was the 2nd person evicted. Her three small children, dressed in nothing more than a single coat of coarse blanketing, who played about her knee, while the poor woman, herself half-clothed, with her face bathed in tears, and holding an infant in her arms, assured the Sheriff that she and her children were destitute and without food of any kind. The Sheriff sent for the Inspector of Poor, and ordered him to place the woman and her family on the poor's roll.

=== Status ===
Today MacPhails can generally track their origins from these four main migrations in Scotland, mainly showing fealty to larger clans in those regions:

- MacPhails that migrated east with Clan Chattan Federation but with their own chief and allied to Clan Mackintosh.
- MacPhails that remained in the west and integrated with Clans such as Cameron from the 16th century forward.
- With Clan Campbell and others around Argyll and generally not associated.
- With Clan Mackay in the north of Scotland, but no evidence of association with the other three above.

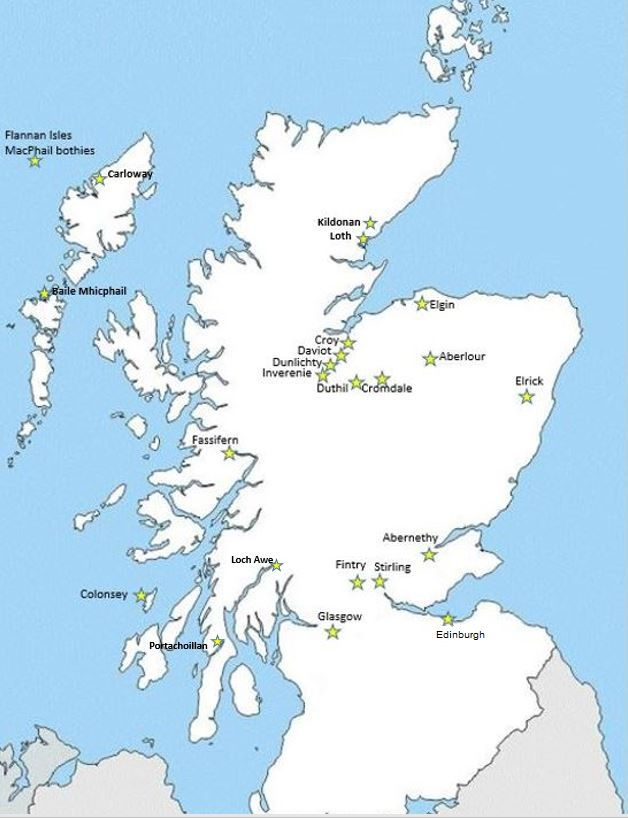
Locations of MacPhail pre industrial historical residential records

Diaspora MacPhails can also be found in significant numbers in the following countries:

- Ireland:
- Canada:
- United States:
- Australia:
- New Zealand:
- South Africa:

== In Folklore and Culture ==
=== Mermaid of Corrivrekin ===
The poet John Leyden, was an enthusiastic collector of old folklore. He compiled a poem "The mermaid". It is based on a gaelic traditional ballad, called MacPhail of Colonsay, and the Mermaid of Corrivrekin. The story states that this MacPhail was carried off by a mermaid, that they lived together in a grotto beneath the sea and had five children, but finally he tired of her and escaped to land.

=== Ballad of Mull ===
A cairn near Loch Spelve celebrates Dugald MacPhail (1819–1887), a bard who composed Ant-Muileach (The Isle of Mull) which became the island's anthem. These MacPhails where apparently known as cattle drovers for hundreds of years in this area.

=== Captain Lachlan MacPhail of Tiree ===
Pipe tune written by Peter MacFarquhar of Moss in remembrance of Lachlan MacPhail, an accomplished piper and writer of Gaelic poetry. Lachlan was a ruse mourner at the funeral in Operation Mincemeat, a British deception operation of the Second World War.

== See also ==
- Dunlichty Church, graveyard of MacPhail chiefs

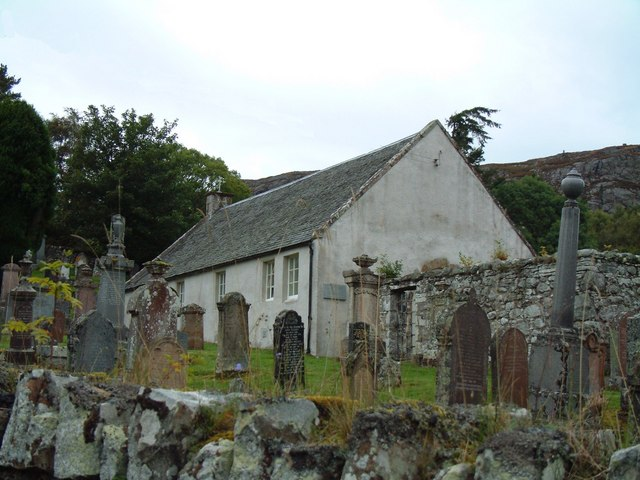
Dunlichity Church

- Mount McPhail, Canada
- Cobden/Bruce McPhail Memorial Airport, Ontario, Canada
- McPhail Memorial Baptist Church, Ottawa, Canada
- Fergus McPhail, Australian children's television programme
- McPhail v Doulton (1970), landmark English trusts law decision by the House of Lords
- Gordon & MacPhail whisky
- University of Prince Edward Island Clan MacPhail Scholarship Award
- Seven Men of Knoydart Post WW2 soldiers amongst them Duncan MacPhail and Jack MacHardy who attempted to claim smallholdings to house and feed their families, citing the Land Settlement Act, sparking intense national media coverage.
- Southern Alberta Institute of Technology MacPhail School of Energy
- Paul Mactire
- United States Navy Arleigh Burke-class destroyers:
  - USS John Paul Jones (DDG-53)
  - USS McFaul (DDG-74)

== Notes ==
- McPhail Genealogy and Family History
- Surname: Macphail
- Surname: Paul
- Clan MacPhail
