= John Auldjo =

Mountain climber

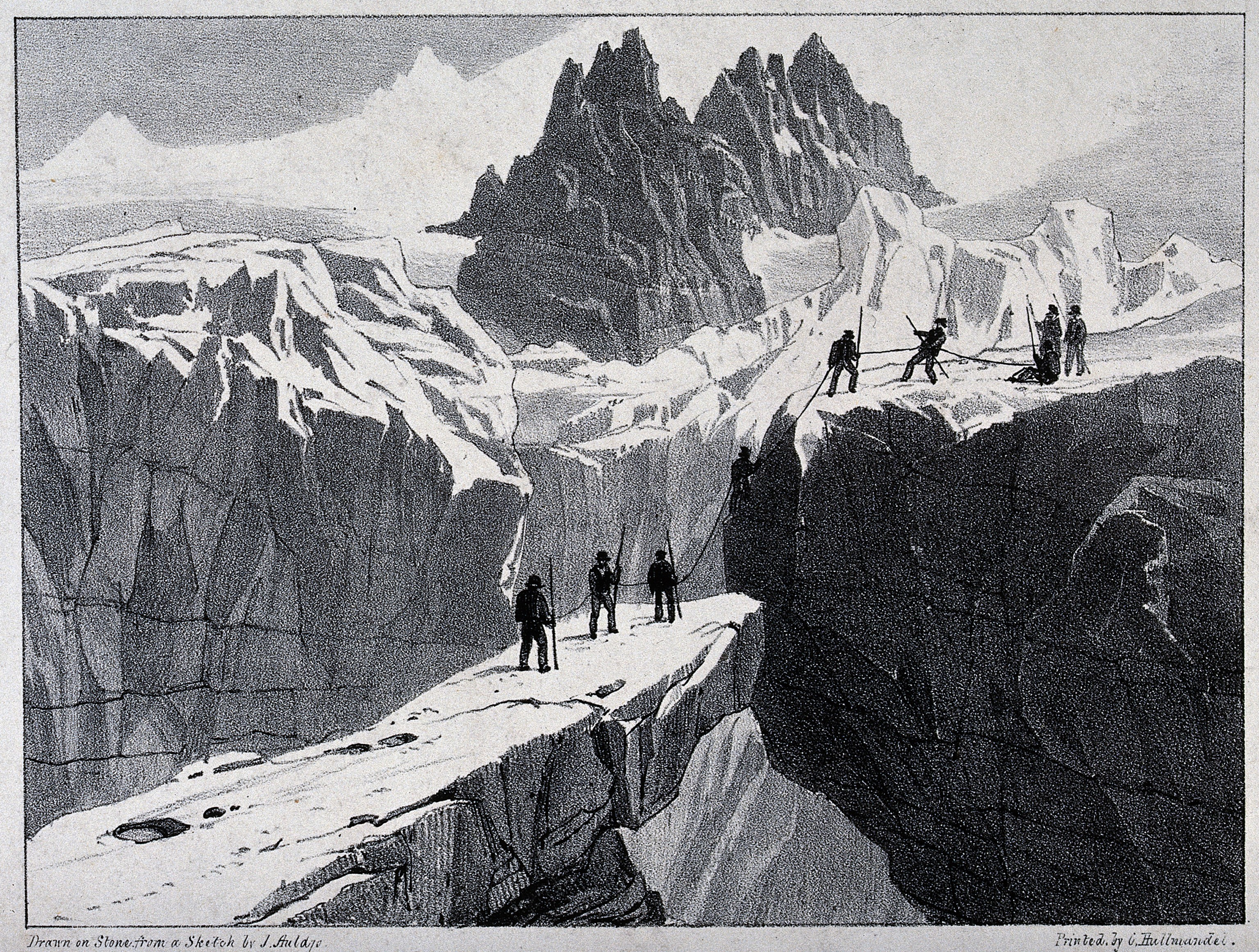
The ascent of Mont Blanc by John Auldjo's party in 1827, lithograph

John Richardson Auldjo (26 July 1805 – 6 May 1886), FRS, FRGS, was a Canadian-British traveller, geologist, writer and artist. He was British Consul at Geneva. He was a close friend of Edward Bulwer-Lytton and a member of Sir William Gell's inner circle at Naples.

== Life ==
In 1805, John Auldjo was born into a prominent family of merchants at Montreal. He was the elder of the two sons of Alexander Auldjo and his wife Eweretta Jane Richardson (1774–1808), half-sister of John Richardson, her mother being a Phyn and his a Stewart. John Forsyth was her first cousin and Edward Ellice a more distant cousin. His brother, Thomas Richardson Auldjo (1808–1837), married Anna, elder daughter of William McGillivray and a niece of both John MacDonald of Garth and General Sir Archibald Campbell. John Auldjo was a godson of Simon McGillivray, who looked after him and his brother in London after they were orphaned in their teens.

In 1822, Auldjo entered Trinity College, Cambridge where he met Edward Bulwer-Lytton, and subsequently secured a place at Lincoln's Inn. In August 1827, as a penance for a London gambling debt the previous year, he ascended Mont Blanc, assisted by six local guides. He was the 14th man up. At the summit he shared a bottle of wine with the guides and then sat down to write a short letter (in pencil since ink didn't flow at that altitude) to his sister-in-law Anna, implying to her that his penance had been redeemed. The letter, still preserved today and signed on the back by all six guides, is one of the most evocative items in the Archives of the Alpine Club. Auldjo subsequently wrote and illustrated an account of his ascent, the first such account to be published rather than privately printed.It ran to three editions.

From 1829 he lived for 7 years in Naples together with his younger brother Thomas and his family, becoming well-acquainted with the local English expatriates, notably including Sir William Gell, Keppel Craven, Edward Dodwell, James Mathias and William Noel-Hill. Visitors during this period included Sir Walter Scott, to whom Auldjo acted as cicerone, and Auldjo's Cambridge friend Edward Bulwer-Lytton. Auldjo made an important contribution to Bulwer-Lytton's novel 'The Last Days of Pompeii. Local acquaintances included Charles, Prince of Capua, the King's brother, and Giuseppe Capecelatro archbishop of Taranto. On leaving London he had given a power of attorney over his Canadian properties to his lawyer, Thomas Kirkpatrick.

During this period in Naples Auldjo regularly visited Mount Vesuvius during a time of vigorous volcanic activity. He published a book on his studies, filled with hand-coloured lithographs of the volcano in full eruption. This publication was rewarded with Fellowships at the Royal Society and the Royal Geographical Society.

In the summer of 1833, he toured Constantinople, the Greek Islands, and Sicily, and in 1835 publishing an account of his tour. Since 1826, when he was put forward by Simon McGillivray, Auldjo had been an active Freemason. In 1837 when Auldjo had finally returned from Naples, McGillivray appointed him his Deputy as Grand Master of Upper Canada, and as such in the summer of that year he visited and toured to raise the morale of the local membership. This visit was cut short by the death of his brother Thomas of cholera in Naples. Thomas's family then returned to London to settle, with Auldjo, in a large townhouse near Kensington Palace. In 1840 Auldjo dealt with Simon McGillivray's executry and was briefly again involved with Freemasonry.Thereafter he fades into relative obscurity until the late 1850s when Anna and her two daughters all died and the townhouse and its contents were sold. After settling with local blackmailers (Auldjo was homosexual) he left England and rather improbably married in France an English girl some 30 years his junior, and finally settled, together with a surviving daughter, in Geneva where for many years he acted as honorary British Consul. He is recorded as communicating during this period with his lawyer Sir George Airey Fitzpatrick regarding property in Canada made over to his niece Madeleine Auldjo, by then deceased.

In Geneva he became acquainted with James Fazy, the leading local politician of the day, also with his neighbour Charles, 2nd Duke of Brunswick, who was exiled from Paris and London following the Franco-Prussian war. This excessively camp Brunswick was also obligated to his own London blackmailer. Auldjo hosted the British team during the 'Alabama' arbitrage tribunal, held in Geneva, in relation to unofficial British support for the Confederate navy during the American Civil War. Auldjo is commemorated in the local Protestant church. He died in 1886 and was buried in the Chatelaine Cemetery.

== Works ==
- Narrative of an Ascent to the Summit of Mont Blanc: On 8 and 9 August 1827 (London, 1828)
- Sketches of Vesuvius, with short accounts of its principal eruptions, from the commencement of the Christian era to the present time (Naples, 1832)
- Journal of a visit to Constantinople, and some of the Greek islands in the Spring and Summer of 1833 (London, 1835)
