= Alexander Auldjo =

Canadian politician

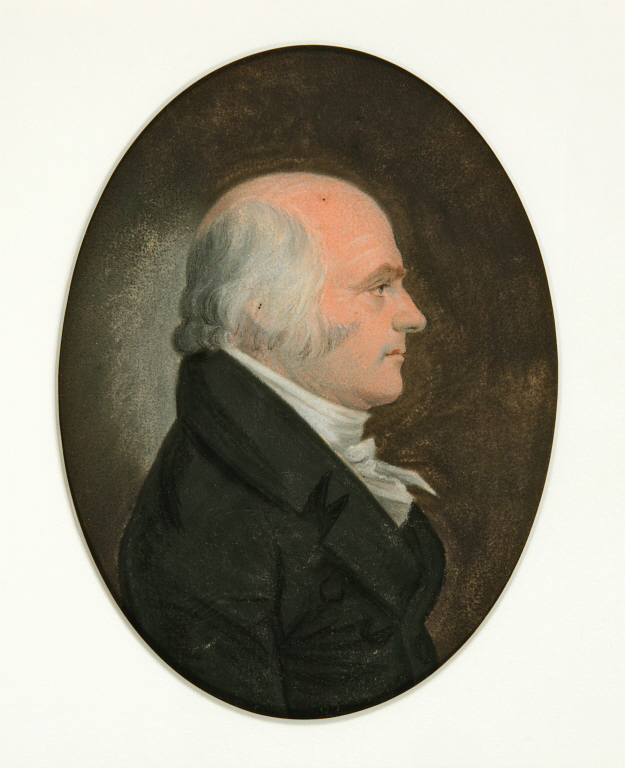
- Born: 21 October 1758; Aberdeen
- Died: 21 May 1821 (aged 62); London

Lt.-Colonel The Hon. Alexander Auldjo (21 October 1758 – 21 May 1821) was a businessman and political figure in Lower Canada.

== Life ==
He was born in Aberdeen, Scotland in 1758, the son of a prominent merchant, John Auldjo (1710–1786), of Portlethen Castle and Aberdeen. He came to Montreal around 1778. He became involved in the fur trade and, later, in the export of wheat and the importing of goods from England. Auldjo also owned property at Montreal and in Upper Canada. In 1796, he was elected to the Legislative Assembly of Lower Canada for Montreal West. He was also named a justice of the peace for Montreal district in 1796 and became a warden of Trinity House of Quebec in 1800. He served in the local militia and was promoted to lieutenant-colonel during the War of 1812. Auldjo was agent for the Phoenix Assurance Company of London in Upper and Lower Canada and later for the Pelican Life Assurance Company. He returned to England in 1813. In 1817, he became a shareholder in the Bank of Montreal. His brother George was Lord Provost of Aberdeen.

== Family ==
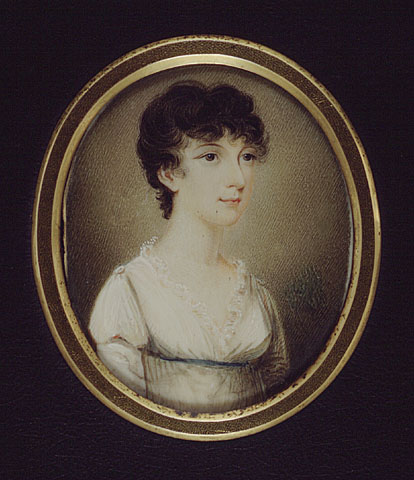
Eweretta Jane Richardson, before marriage to Alexander Auldjo

In 1804, Auldjo married Eweretta Jane, daughter of Thomas Richardson, merchant in Portsoy, Banffshire and his second wife Helen Phyn, a sister of James Phyn. They were married at Portsoy on 21 January 1804, where Auldjo is designated a merchant in Canada. Eweretta Richardson was the half sister of John Richardson. The Auldjos were the parents of John Auldjo and Thomas Auldjo. The latter married a daughter of William McGillivray and the former was a godson of Simon McGillivray. His nephew, George Auldjo, later became a Montreal merchant and a partner in the company formed by his uncle. Alexander Auldjo died at London, 1821.
