= William McGillivray =

Scottish-born fur trader

The Honourable William McGillivray
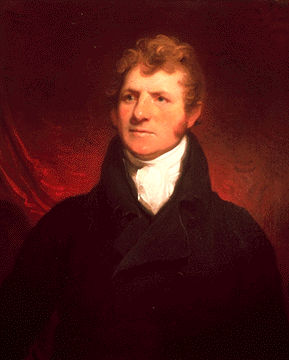

Chief Partner of the North West Company
- In office 1804–1821
- Preceded by: Simon McTavish

Member of the Legislative Assembly of Lower Canada
- In office 1808–1810
- Preceded by: John Richardson
- Succeeded by: Thomas McCord

Member of the Legislative Council of Lower Canada
- In office 1814–1825

Personal details
- Born: 1764 Dunlichty, Inverness-shire
- Died: 16 October 1825 (aged 60–61) St John's Wood, London
- Spouse(s): Susan married McGillivray; Magdalen MacDonald of Garth
- Children: 5 sons and 6 daughters

Lt.-Colonel The Hon. William McGillivray (1764 – 16 October 1825) was a Scottish-born Canadian fur trader. He succeeded his uncle Simon McTavish as the last chief partner of the North West Company until a merger between the NWC and her chief rival – the Hudson's Bay Company. He was elected a member of the Legislative Assembly of Lower Canada and afterwards was appointed to the Legislative Council of Lower Canada. In 1795, he was inducted as a member into the Beaver Club. During the War of 1812 he was given the rank of lieutenant colonel in the Corps of Canadian Voyageurs (the ultimate rank in the Corps) as he was the highest up in the NWC's business hierarchy; the ranks of the Corps reflected one's position within the NWC as the Company had created the Corps under their own volition, and using employees as soldiers. He once owned substantial estates in Scotland (Bhein Ghael Estate), Lower (12000 acres in Inverness Township) and Upper Canada (Plantagenet Township). His home in Montreal was one of the early estates of the Golden Square Mile (like many other members of the Beaver Club). McGillivray Ridge in British Columbia is named for him, as well as a handful of elementary schools in Ontario, Quebec, or British Columbia.

== Early years ==
In 1764, McGillivray was born at Dunlichity, near Daviot in the Scottish Highlands. He was the eldest son of Donald Roy McGillivray (1741–1803), tacksman of Achnalodan in Dunmaglass and later of Dalscoilt in Strathnairn. His mother, Anne (1740–1807), was the daughter of Lieutenant John McTavish (1701–1774), of Garthbeg.

The McGillivrays had traditionally held the Dunmaglass estate since the fourteenth century, and William's grandfather was a first cousin of the Chief of Clan McGillivray, Captain William McGillivray of Dunmaglass. However, on his side of the family the land had dissipated so that William's father was a small tenant on what had become part of the Lovat estate, and he was unable to provide secondary schooling for William and his brothers Duncan and Simon. When William's uncle, Simon McTavish, visited from Montreal in 1776, he paid for the education of the McGillivray boys and in 1784 brought William out to Canada to work for him in the North West Company, with an annual salary of £100.

== Fur trading ==
As a clerk, after a year between Montreal and Rainy River, he was accompanied by proprietor Patrick Small to Île-à-la-Crosse, Saskatchewan. He spent the winter of 1786–87, at Snake Lake, setting up a trading post to compete with Gregory, McLeod & Co. He and Roderick McKenzie served their respective companies on good terms with each other. McGillivray played an important part in the two companies merging in 1787. The following year he returned to Île-à-la-Crosse and started trading at Rat River. This enabled him to purchase the share left open by Peter Pond in the North West Company, for £800 in 1790. Promoted to the rank of proprietor, he was given responsibility at Churchill River, where about 80 men and 40 Métis lived. At about this time he took his 'country wife', a Metis woman named Susan. In 1791, he was given charge of the westernmost department on the Athabasca River, which had been extended even further to the Pacific Ocean by Alexander Mackenzie in 1793. All these postings were crucial to the experience he needed to one day step into his uncle's shoes, who was becoming increasingly dominant within the NWC.

During this winter at Snake Lake, a man named John Ross (a member of Gregory, MacLeod and Company, and former partner in the NWC) would be murdered - William and Roderick McKenzie Sr. at this time (but near Grand Portage after a hasty voyage - not at Snake Lake) apparently played a role in the 1787 merger of the NWC and Gregory, MacLeod and Company, whose acquisition would be "to the benefit of Simon McTavish" (William's uncle and the chief principal of the NWC). Information on this particular Roderick McKenzie Sr. is difficult to find as his namesake was only "one of several fur traders bearing this name", so the degree to which one has to sift through detail (and potential detail) is immense, hence the "apparently" moniker.

== McTavish, Frobisher and Co. ==
McGillivray returned to Montreal in 1793 and then took a trip to Scotland and England. He was now a partner in McTavish, Frobisher & Co., who controlled the NWC. With John Gregory, he was sent to manage the company's huge depot at Grand Portage, stirring jealousy among some of the other partners, with others speaking of straight up nepotism. As a particularly telling example of this potential nepotism: the extremely effective explorer Alexander Mackenzie joined MFC in 1795 - the man had essentially discovered the Northwest Passage - and was made an underling to William in that Alexander was made nothing more than "an assistant (to William) at Grand Portage, despite all of his meretricious success in exploration and expansion particularly for the North West Company belonging to William and his uncle Simon.

When Joseph Frobisher retired in 1798, McGillivray then took his place, and William thenceforth became "involved in all important matters" upon historical evaluation, and steadily grew further and further into the upper echelons of the NWC's management firm, the MFC: William was involved with the establishment of a New York agency, all of the activities within the MFC across the pond in London, the founding of a firm in 1788 which was created by his uncle Simon and his cousin John Fraser, involvement in trading with China (see below), the massive relocation from Grand Portage to Kaministiquia (close to Thunder Bay, Ontario, referred to as Fort William at the time) in 1803, the relations and relationship with the Hudson's Bay Company, and finally the struggle with a tenacious offshoot splinter company which would eventually snag some 25% of the NWC shares called the New North West Company - better known as the "XY Company". led by one John Richardson.

In 1814, William and his brother Simon McGillivray met in Fort William (Thunder Bay), on Lake Superior, and planned to sell pelts in China. Subsequently, William set up an agency at New York City to get around the East India Company's monopoly enabling them to trade with China.

== North West Company ==
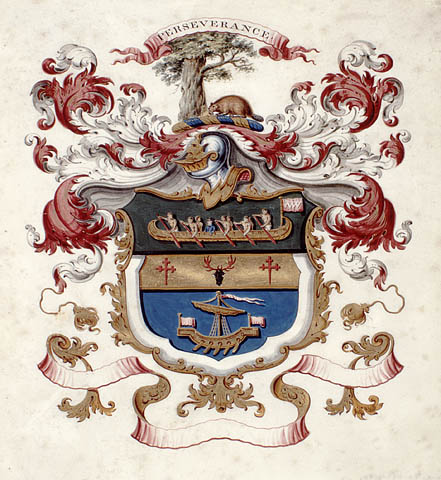
North West Company – Coat of Arms

When Simon McTavish died in July 1804, McGillivray was well experienced and became the head of the NWC, and the executor of his uncle's will. He took over at a period of intense competition in the North American fur trade. His first action was to strike a deal ending the NWC's half-decade of rivalry with the XY Company, later serving as a coalition between them. He surrendered 25% of the NWC's shares to the XY, but left his close friend, Alexander Mackenzie, out of the new co-partnership because of his reputation as a trouble-maker in the fur trade.

He reorganized the managing firm of McTavish, Frobisher and Co., which after John Gregory's retirement in December 1806, he both announced a new management structure for the company and renamed the firm McTavish, McGillivrays and Co. The partners were himself, his brother Duncan, their brother-in-law Angus Shaw, and the two Hallowell brothers, James and William. The London firm of McTavish, Fraser & Co., remained unchanged except for McGillivray bringing in another brother, Simon. Due to rising costs within the NWC (the rivalry with the XY Company had essentially fueled the "rise in salaries and number of salaried employees" - however it was actually "chiefly linked to the intensified competition with the Americans and the HBC") he reduced manpower and curtailed the various costly habits of the living and travelling arrangements of the proprietors, such as the mode in which they travelled, if and how many servants were kept, and the maintenance of their wives and children. Additionally, "stricter control" was imposed upon the engagés (the servants of the masters of the NWC - the bourgeois - whom were majority Canadien) of the company and their knack for personal fur-trading on the side of fur-trading for the company proper (like John Jacob Astor being the NWC agent to China, selling those NWC pelts, and then selling his own American pelts to the Russian-American Company, the various Russian Creole settlements in and around Alaska, and possibly the other Russian Colonial possessions at the time present until October 1867).

== Competition with Astor ==
The rising costs and fall in profits were largely attributed to the intensified competition with John Jacob Astor and the HBC and the disruptions in the European market caused by the French Revolution. At first the NWC had collaborated with Astor in that McTavish had established a branch in New York in 1796 to avoid the East India Company's monopoly, and they shared some of the same trade routes to China. This cooperation was only essential for a small amount of time, only lasted for small amount of time, or both. Nonetheless, Astor was involved with further trade that also followed the same commercial trade circuits as the NWC. There was also some brief cooperation with John Ogilvy's Michilimackinac Company. Over time, American pressure at their shared Pacific trading post on the mouth of the Columbia River was applied to the NWC in a subtle but systematic fashion, and to retain his freedom, McGillivray contemplated negotiating with the East India Company, and establishing a trading post on the Canadian Pacific Coast.

David Thompson had attempted to "gain a direct line of communication with the Orient" through his western explorations of 1810-1811, however, by the time he arrived in July 1811, Astor's men coming by sea were already present on the mouth of the Columbia River. For some years many American and Canadian vessels made profitable runs on this trading circuit, but (as mentioned above) the American's applied systemic pressure.

== Hudson's Bay Company ==
The rivalry between the North West Company of Montreal and the Hudson's Bay Company gradually degenerated into a bitter and violent struggle, first under McTavish and then McGillivray. From 1810, the scarcity of beaver began to be a problem and only served to heighten tensions between the two companies. The NWC was stronger on the ground, but it was not as financially strong as the HBC. The HBC had begun to break the traditional practice of waiting for "the Indians" to come to the bay, and were seeking to establish posts anywhere the NWC was located. The HBC did not help to relieve these tensions though, going so far as to reject the request of the NWC to simply bring in goods via "their" bay. As they obviously rejected, Simon McTavish had sent out two expeditions, one by land and one by sea: the land expedition "gained a foothold on Hayes Island (in Ontario, close to Nâmowan and Moose Factory) in 1800" and the sea expedition "landed on Charlton Island (Nunavut) in 1803" in the mouth of James Bay, the drainage outlet for Hudson Bay bordering the coasts of Ontario, Quebec, and Nunavut. These trips were "very costly actions" and by 1806 had racked up the cost of some 45000 Pound Sterling, with the expeditions "not bringing the desired results". William saw two other options: either obtain an Imperial Charter from the Crown or to attempt to purchase majority shares in the HBC - a method used previously which had never yet succeeded.

During the War of 1812, the Americans destroyed the NWC's trading post at Sault Ste. Marie, giving them a net loss of over £8,000 (at least 8330 Pound) for that year. Also in 1812, Lord Selkirk (a shareholder in the HBC) established the Red River Colony which directly served the interests of the HBC and affected the NWC's free transport of goods between Fort William and the fur-bearing Lake Athabasca region. Attempting to gain control over the movement of Pemmican in the region, Miles Macdonell, governor of the new Red River Colony, declared war with the established NWC men. This led to the "Pemmican War" and would conclude in violence with the Battle of Seven Oaks (aka the Battle of Winnipeg).

McGillivray had no illusions about Lord Selkirk's actions nor about the conduct of Miles Macdonell, remarking that Selkirk, "has thought proper lately to become the avowed rival of the North-West Company in the trade which they themselves have carried on for upwards of thirty years with credit to themselves. In a fair commercial competition, we have no objection to enter the lists with his Lordship, but we cannot remain passive spectators to the violence used to plunder or destroy our property". The struggle was continued by Macdonell's successors, Robertson and then Semple, culminating in the Battle of Seven Oaks, in which Semple and some 20 settlers were killed by the NWC men, led by Cuthbert Grant.

Lord Selkirk arrested McGillivray and a number of NWC proprietors on the 13th of August in 1816 while on his way to Red River with a small force of regulars and some 90 mercenaries, holding the NWC responsible for the "massacre". He seized Fort William and confiscated their furs for his own benefit. McGillivray was released and cleared at Montreal. The strength held by the NWC had been in a steady decline since 1810 and Selkirk's actions helped tip the balance in the power struggle towards the HBC, even with its massive 100,000 Pound debt to the Bank of England. Nevertheless, "the decline of the NWC had...begun well before Selkirk's intervention and was linked to many other factors". William's brother Simon conceded in a December 27, 1825 letter that from 1810 onwards, the richest and most talented partners of the NWC (notably those connected to the XY Company) had withdrawn and been replaced by men with less capital and less work ethic, and given to extravagant spending. Nepotism was also a problem: 14 members of the McTavish and McGillivray families (not including relatives by marriage) had been given partnerships since 1800, undermining the drive and morale of those hoping for promotion.

Eventually, William McGillivray accepted the inevitability of a merger between the NWC and the HBC, and his brother Simon McGillivray set about bringing it to pass. An agreement was signed in 1821 and the once great Montreal company disappeared under the trading banner of the HBC. McGillivray was content that he had settled on equal terms (more below) with the HBC, but only a few months after his death both McTavish, McGillivrays & Co., of London and McGillivrays, Thain & Co., of Montreal were declared bankrupt; William, full of exorbitant pride, proclaimed to the Family Compact's John Strachan that "It would have been worse than folly, to have continued the contest further. We have made no submission – we met & negotiated on equal terms." However, the fate of the two companies would argue the opposite.

== Life at Montreal ==
McGillivray enjoyed a leading role in Quebec society, particularly at Montreal. He had been elected a member of the Beaver Club in 1795 and in 1804 he was made a Justice of the Peace in the Indian Territories, and for the District of Quebec in 1815, plus Montreal and Three Rivers in 1821. In 1808, he replaced John Richardson in the Legislative Assembly of Lower Canada and in 1814 he was elected to the Legislative Council of Lower Canada. He also became a significant landowner, purchasing 12,000 acres at Inverness, Quebec in 1802, which he later sold to Joseph Frobisher. During the War of 1812, McGillivray obtained the rank of lieutenant-colonel in the Corps of Canadian Voyageurs, who succeeded in capturing Detroit. In gratitude for this service, the government of Upper Canada granted him the substantial lands at Plantagenet. In 1817, at a cost of £20,000, he purchased 'Bhein Ghael', a comparatively small but beautifully located Scottish estate on the Isle of Mull, overlooking Ghael Bay. In 1808, David Thompson had given what is now called the Kootenay River the name McGillivray's River, in honour of William and his brother Duncan. After losing the NWC to the HBC, McGillivray had made ready to leave Montreal for a new life in England. He died during a trip to London in 1825 and was buried at St James's Church, Piccadilly, where there is a memorial to him and his wife in the church. Their graves were destroyed by enemy bombs during the Second World War.

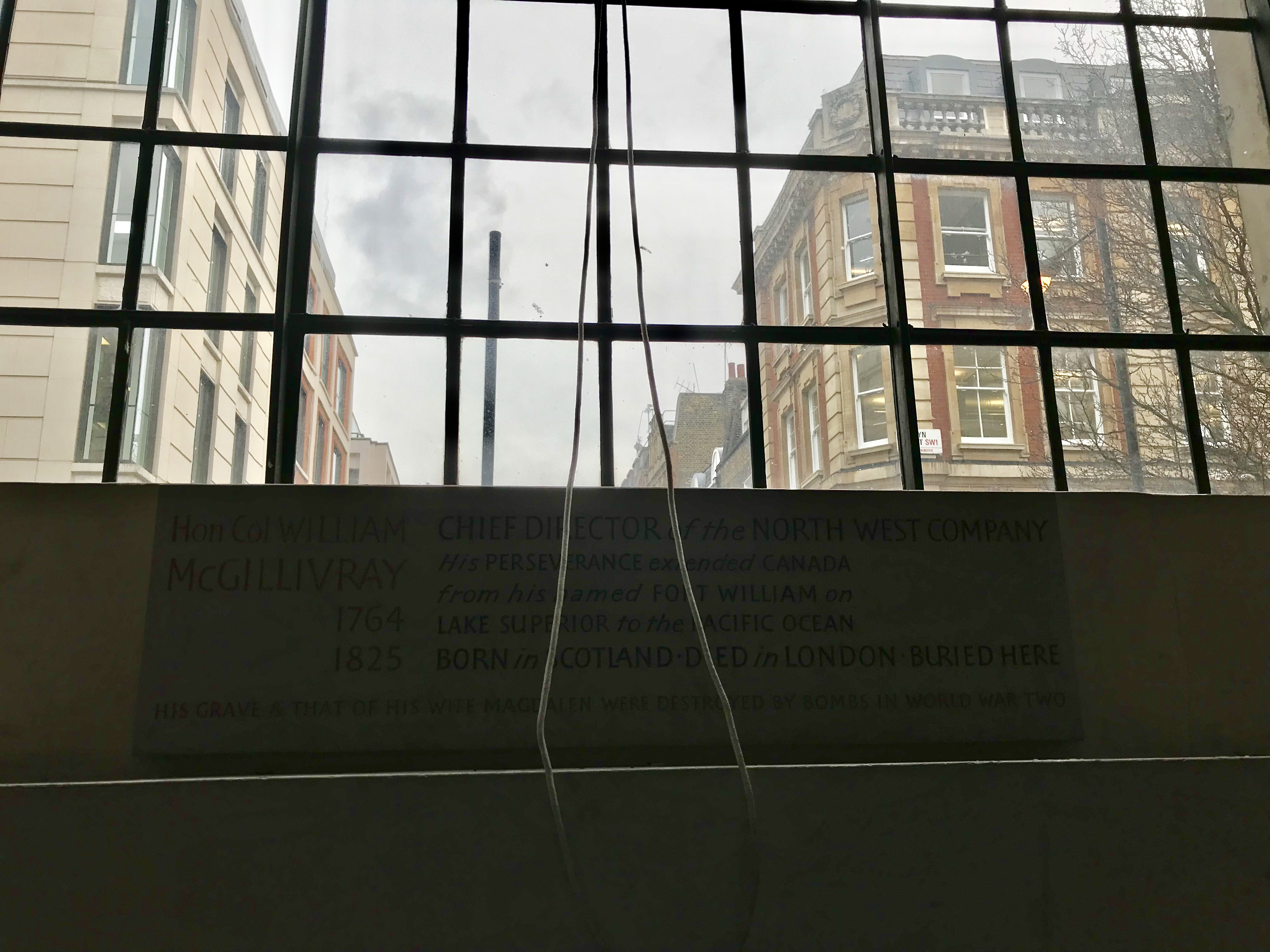
A memorial to William McGillivray in St James's Church, Piccadilly.

== Chateau Saint Antoine ==
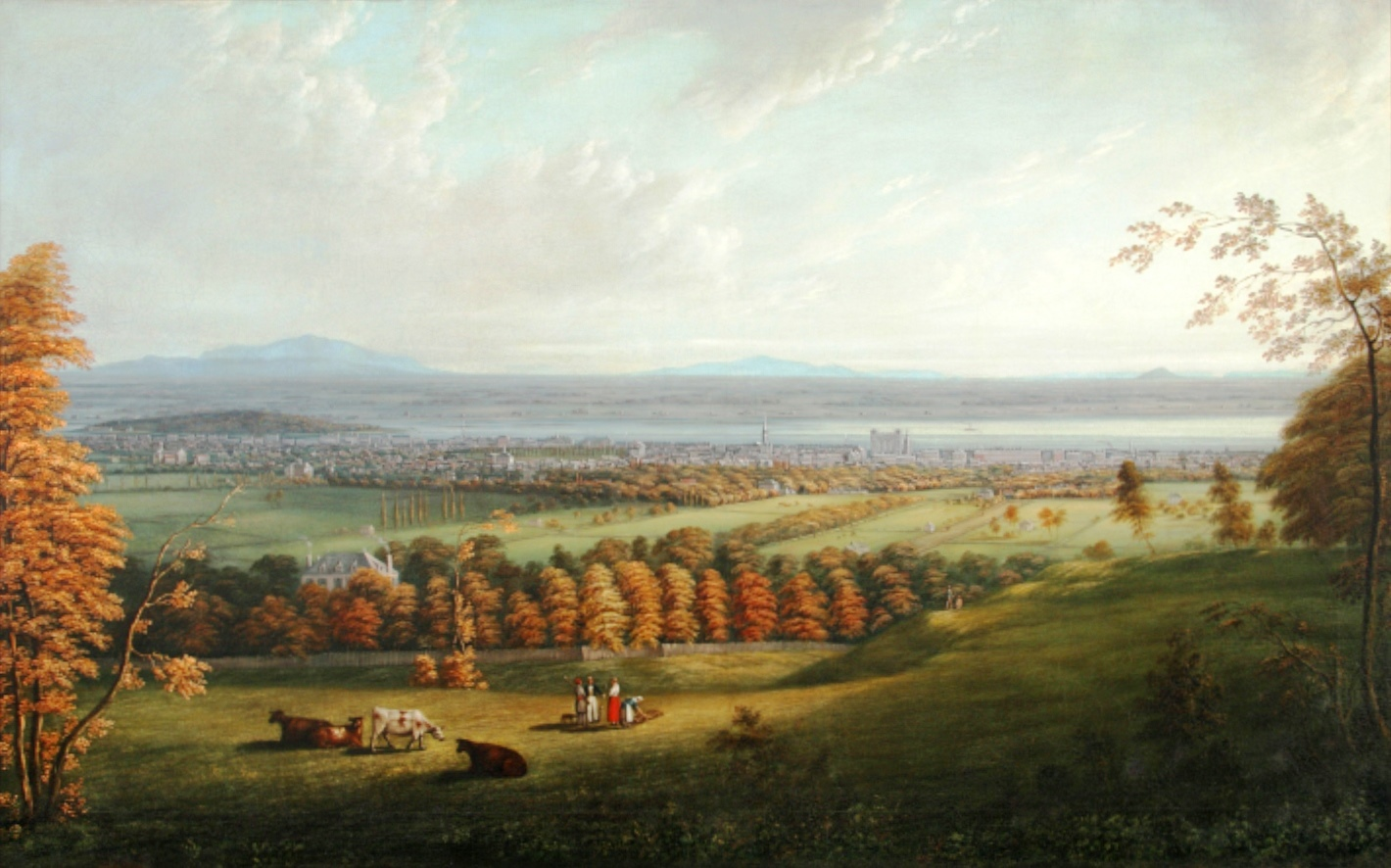
This view of Montreal from the mountain in 1831 is thought to show Chateau Saint-Antoine within the trees

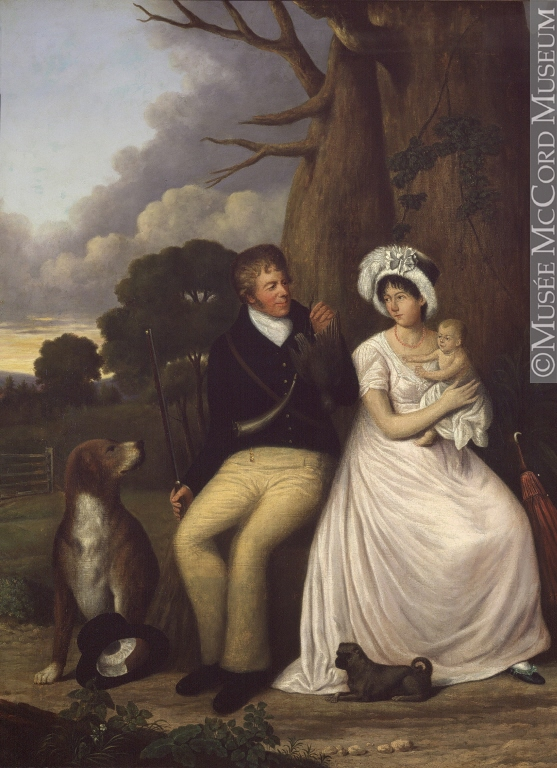
William and Magdalen (McDonald) McGillivray, 1806, by William Berczy

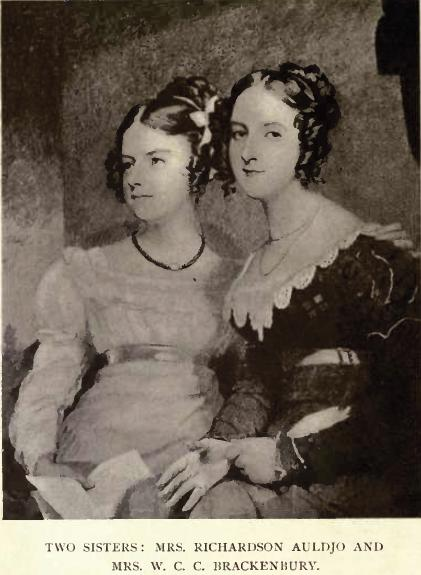
William McGillivray's daughters Mrs. Richardson Auldjo and Mrs. Brackenbury

McGillivray's home, Chateau St. Antoine, stood within 200 acres of parkland on Cote St. Antoine, roughly at the end of Dorchester Street. Built in 1803, the house enjoyed "a magnificent view of the city and river". The McGillivrays were well known for their hospitality and kept open house at St. Antoine, as they had done before in their townhouse on St. Gabriel Street. Even his old rival John Jacob Astor came to dine there once a year on his annual trips to Montreal. The ballroom was said to be "an enchanting sight". In 1820, the English geologist, John Jeremiah Bigsby, was invited to a dinner at St. Antoine, which he described at great length in his entertaining book, The Shoe and Canoe:

"I had the pleasure of dining with the then great Amphictyon of Montreal at his seat, on a high terrace under the mountain, looking southwards and laid out in pleasure-grounds in the English style. The view from the drawing room windows of this large and beautiful mansion is extremely fine, too rich and fair, I foolishly thought, to be out of my native England. Close beneath you are scattered elegant country retreats embowered in plantations, succeeded by a crowd of orchards of delicious apples, spreading far to the right and left, and hedging in the glittering churches, hotels, and house-roofs of Montreal, Quebec..."

"Mr McGillivray was accustomed to entertain the successive governors in their progresses, and was well entitled to such honour, not only from his princely fortune, but from his popularity, honesty of purpose, and intimate acquaintance with the true interests of the colony... My host was then a widower with two well-educated daughters. The company was various and consisted of a judge or two, some members of the Legislative Council and three or four retired partners of the North West Company of fur-traders (including David Thompson). Our dinner and wines were perfect. The conversation was fluent and sensible... It is hardly necessary to say that I passed a very agreeable evening. Our host was a large, handsome man, with the pleasant, successful look of the men of his habits and mode of life."

== Family ==
William McGillivray had four brothers and four sisters:

In the tradition of the fur traders, McGillivray had first taken a 'country wife' while in Manitoba, a Cree lady named Susan. They were the parents of three sons and a daughter, though one son did not survive to adulthood.

- Elizabeth Jourdain née McGillivray (1786–1858)
- Simon McGillivray Jr. (1791–1840)
- Joseph McGillivray (1791–1832)
- William McGillivray (1796–1832)
- Peter McGillivray (?–?)

In 1800, at St. Mary's, Marylebone in London, McGillivray married Magdalen (d.1811), daughter of Captain John McDonald of Garth, Perthshire, by his wife Magdalen, daughter of James Small. Sir Alexander Mackenzie described Mrs. Magdalen McGillivray as, "an agreeable, lively brunette of the most expressive countenance". Mrs. McGillivray's brothers were John MacDonald of Garth and The Hon. Archibald Macdonald, and their sister, Helen, was married to General Sir Archibald Campbell, 1st Baronet, Commander-in-Chief of the British forces in the First Anglo-Burmese War. Mrs. McGillivray's mother was a niece of Major-General John Small and Alexander Small, two of the first cousins of General John Robertson Reid. The McGillivrays were the parents of five daughters and one son, but only two of their daughters reached adulthood.

- Magdalen McGillivray (1801–1801)
- Mary McGillivray (1803–1803)
- Anna Maria Auldjo née McGillivray (1805–1856)
- Helen Elizabeth McGillivray (1806–1806)
- Magdalen Julia Brackenbury née McGillivray (1808–1888)
- William McGillivray (1809–1810)
