= Inverernie =

Hamlet in Scotland

Coordinates: 57.374°N 4.182°W

Inverernie (Gaelic: Inbhir Fhearna) is a small settlement, with a local shop, within Farr and the wider area of Strathnairn in the Highlands of Scotland. This corner of Farr was originally home to Inverernie Estate before it was later sold in the mid 20th century.

The spelling of Inverernie accidentally changed to 'Inverarnie' in the latter half of the 20th century, and has remained so ever since. There is also a small croft named 'Inverarnie' half a mile south of Inverernie, below the hill Meall Mòr, whose name is another variation of the Gaelic 'Inbhir Fhearna'. Although both derive from the same Gaelic name, natives have always made a distinction between the two pronunciations.

Since the 15th century Clan MacPhail was found mainly in the lands around Inverernie.
