= Thomas Thain =

Canadian politician

The Hon. Thomas Thain (baptised January 7, 1778 – January 26, 1832). He was a Scottish-born merchant and political figure in Lower Canada. He was a partner in the North West Company and a member of the Beaver Club. He represented Montreal East in the Legislative Assembly of Lower Canada from 1820 to 1824.

Born at Newmill, Pitfancy, Forgue, Aberdeenshire. He was the eldest son of John Thain (1739–1816), of Drumblair, and his wife Anna Richardson (1758–1824), sister of The Hon. John Richardson. he served as a clerk with the XY Company and became a partner in McTavish, McGillivray and Company in 1814. In 1811, he was named a lieutenant in the Montreal militia and served during the War of 1812. Thain was an early shareholder and director of the Bank of Montreal and served as vice-president from 1822 to 1825. He was a member of the Beaver Club at Montreal. Thain was also a commissioner for the construction of the Lachine Canal. He travelled to Scotland for a visit in 1825, planning to seek medical care and visit his family. He suffered an attack of "brain fever" there and was confined to an asylum in Aberdeen in 1826, where he died six years later. He was unmarried and is buried with his family at Forgue Kirkyard, Aberdeenshire.
