= Farr, Strathnairn =

Coordinates: 57.36996°N 4.190018°W

Farr: Scottish Gaelic: Fàrr
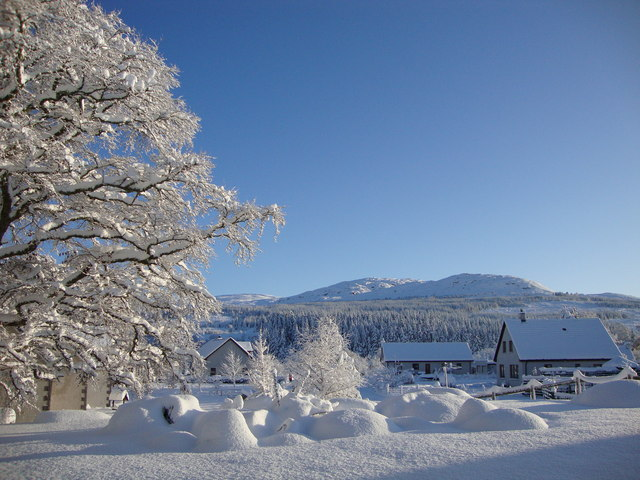
- Wintry scene at An Darach, Farr

- Location within the Inverness area
- OS grid reference: NH683331
- Council area: Highland
- Country: Scotland
- Sovereign state: United Kingdom
- Post town: Inverness
- Postcode district: IV2 6
- Police: Scotland
- Fire: Scottish
- Ambulance: Scottish

Farr (Gaelic: Fàrr) is a large area in Strathnairn, about 12 kilometres (7.5 mi) south of Inverness, in the Highland of Scotland. Much of the area is spread along the B851 single track road. Its boundaries lie just north of Inverernie and Dalveallan, to the south of Socaich, in the west to the Biorraid, and in the east where the Monadhliath Mountains begin. Farr has a primary school, several churches, shop, and a community hall.

Farr Wind Farm is found on the Sealbhanaich, an area located in the Monadhliath Mountains to the south east of Farr and Strathnairn.
