= John Richardson (businessman) =

Canadian politician

The Hon. John Richardson
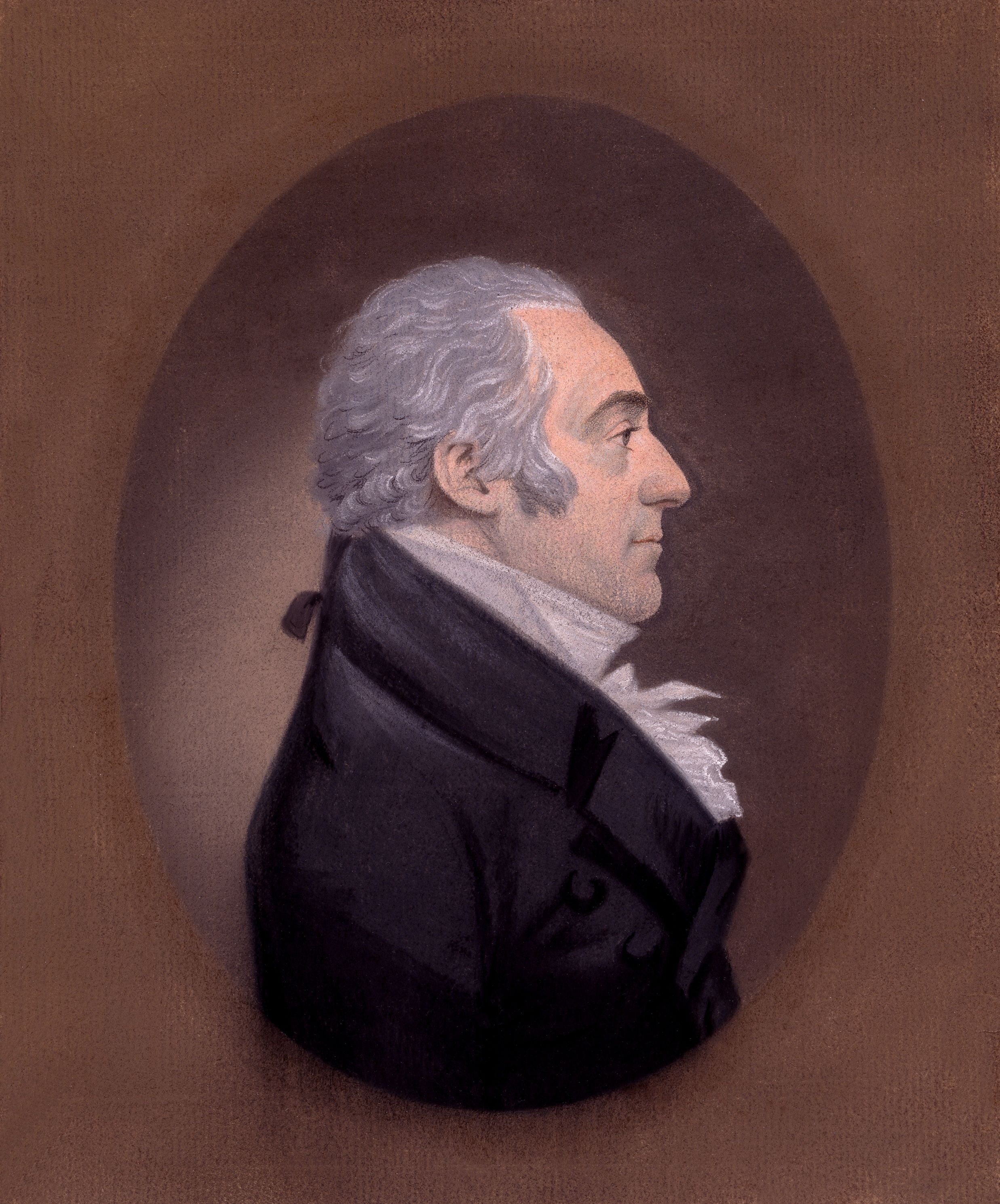
- Born: 1754; Portsoy, Banffshire
- Died: 18 May 1831 (aged 76–77); Montreal, Lower Canada
- Known for: Co-founder of the Bank of Montreal; Co-founder and first President of the Montreal General Hospital; founder of the XY Company.

The Hon. John Richardson (c. 1754 – 18 May 1831) MP, JP was a Scots-Quebecer and arguably Montreal's leading businessman in his time. In trade, he was in partnership with his first cousin, John Forsyth. A member of the Beaver Club, he established the XY Company and co-founded the Bank of Montreal. A staunch Conservative and Royalist, he represented Montreal East in the 1st Parliament of Lower Canada; assuming the role of the voice of the merchants and appointed an honorary member of the Executive Council of Lower Canada. An intellectual, he was President of the Natural History Society of Montreal and well read in modern and ancient history, law, economics, and British poetry. He was a generous patron to both the Presbyterian and the Anglican churches, and the first President of the Montreal General Hospital, where the west wing was named for him.

== Scotland ==
Born circa 1754 at Portsoy, Banffshire, he was the son of Thomas Richardson, a successful merchant, and his first wife Helen, daughter of Robert Stewart of Towiemore, Banffshire. His father afterwards married Helen, daughter of George Phynn (1712-1788), Lord of the Corse of Monelly/Monellie, which allied John to the Forsyths and Ellices. One of his sisters, Eweretta, married The Hon. Alexander Auldjo, and another, Anna, was the mother of The Hon. Thomas Thain.

== American Revolution ==
After receiving his education in the arts at King's College, Aberdeen, in 1774 Richardson was apprenticed to his uncle's successful fur-trading firm, Phynn, Ellice & Co., whose North American operations were then based at Schenectady, New York. In the run up to the American War of Independence, his uncle James Phynn established a supply house in London, and two years later Phynn's partner and brother-in-law, Alexander Ellice, moved the firm's North American base to Montreal. As a Loyalist during the Revolution, Richardson took employment with John Porteous, a former partner of Phynn, Ellice & Co., and one of the main suppliers to the British Army in New York City and Philadelphia. By 1779, Richardson had been appointed a Captain of Marines on the Privateer Vengeance, in which both he and Porteous had shares. From his letters at the time, Richardson described the adventures they undertook, the duplicity of prize crews, and the dangers and confusion of privateering. In typical character, he had boasted, "Let us only see a vessel and we are not afraid but we will soon come up with her".

== Fur trade at Montreal ==
By 1787, Richardson was sent to Montreal to help his cousin John Forsyth reorganise the trading company of Robert Ellice, which included the fur trade among its interests. He became immediately active in politics and may have influenced the retention of British forts in American territory, such as Fort de La Présentation, until 1796. The company quickly became Forsyth Richardson, which was continued until in 1798 resources were pooled several other venturers to form the XY Company. Alexander Mackenzie was brought aboard in 1800. After some years of fierce competition with the Northwest Company, they all merged, the partnership of which Richardson was a member retaining one quarter of the shares.

== Foray into politics ==
Although the Constitutional Act of 1791 did not satisfy him, Richardson ran in the first general election in 1792 and he, along with Joseph Frobisher, was elected for Montreal East. He worked hard and effectively in the assembly but was frustrated by the experience and did not run for election in either 1796 or 1800. In 1804 he won a seat for Montreal West and fought for English speaking and business interests over the next four years. His controversial stands had alienated the voters and he was defeated in 1808 in the Montreal West riding.

Governor Sir James Henry Craig appointed Richardson as the messenger between the Legislative Council of Lower Canada and the Legislative Assembly of Lower Canada in 1808 and in 1811 he became a regular member of the council, a position he held until his death. In 1815, Sir Gordon Drummond granted him 29,800 acres in Grantham.

== Private life and family ==
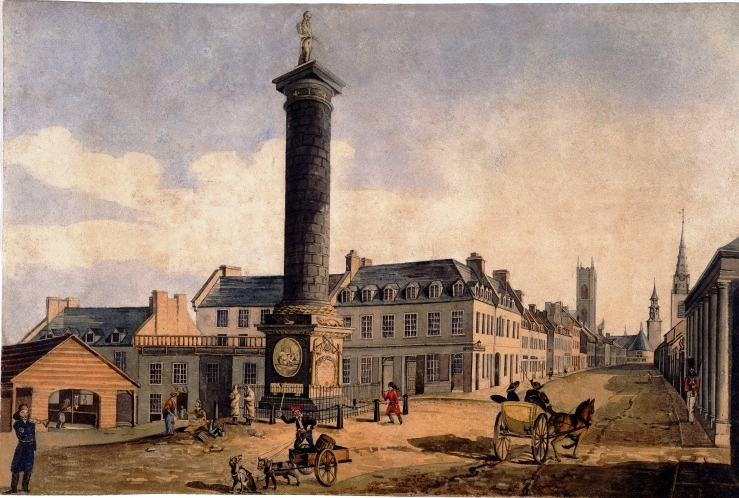
Nelson's Column, Montreal. Erected by Richardson and others in 1809, it still stands today at Place Jacques-Cartier.

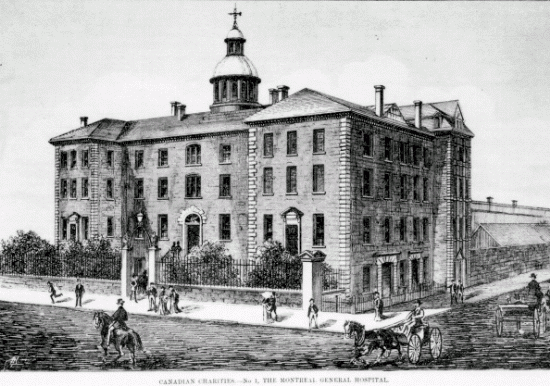
Richardson co-founded the Montreal General Hospital in 1821, and served as its first president. When the west wing was built in 1832 it was named for him.

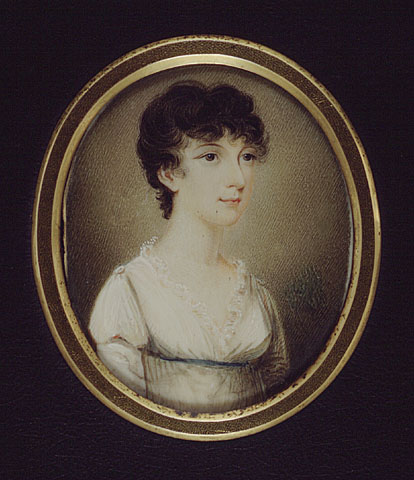
John Richardson's sister, Eweretta, Mrs. Alexander Auldjo. In 1816, her niece, Helen Richardson, married her husband's nephew, George Auldjo

In 1806, Richardson formed part of a committee with Louis Chaboillez, Sir James Monk, Sir John Johnson, John Forsyth and John Ogilvie, to build Nelson's Column, Montreal. Richardson's interests spread far beyond business. He was President of the Natural History Society of Montreal and well read in modern and ancient history, law, economics, and British poetry. He maintained an excellent understanding of British, American, and European politics. For the most part he admired the economist Adam Smith, and Lord Byron was his favourite poet, but he neither admired the man or his politics. Edmund Burke had governed his constitutional thinking on Lower Canada, but in 1831, in the thinking of Edward Ellice and Lord Durham he thought a moderate reform of parliament justified. In personality, he had much of the "state and distance" he so admired in General Sir James Henry Craig, which suited his considerable height and majestic bearing.

After his death, in 1833 the Richardson's home on Saint Antoine Street, Montreal, became Orr's Hotel, which accommodated forty guests. In 1820, John Bigsby described a dinner party given at the Richardsons:

At an evening party at Mr Richardson's the appointments and service were admirable; the dress, manners, and conversation of the guests, in excellent taste. Most of the persons there, though country-born, had been educated in England (Great Britain), and everything savoured of Kensington. There was much good music. I remember to this day the touching effect of a slow air on four notes, sung by a sweet voice, and supposed to be a hymn sung before a wayside oratory in Tuscany.

In 1821, Richardson, William McGillivray and Samuel Gerrard formed a committee to purchase land on which to build the Montreal General Hospital. It was built in 1821, and Richardson was appointed chairman of a committee to superintend its construction, and afterwards served as the first president of the hospital. In 1832, the new west wing was named for him and the plaque to his memory commemorated "the public and private virtues of the Honorable John Richardson.. a liberal contributor to its (the hospital's) foundation and support..". He was a member of and generously gave to both the Presbyterian and the Anglican churches. He was an executor of his friend, James McGill's, will.

In 1794, at the Anglican Christ Church in Montreal, John Richardson married Sarah Ann Grant (1773-1847), niece and heiress of The Hon. William Grant and his wife, widow of the 3rd Baron de Longueuil. The Richardsons were the parents of seven children, including,

- Ann Richardson (1797–1880), married firstly David Ogden (1772–1823), son of Chief Justice Isaac Ogden, of Montreal, and grandson of Judge David A. Ogden. Her first husband was a brother of Charles Richard Ogden and Peter Skene Ogden. Secondly, in 1827, Ann married The Hon. Thomas Brown Anderson, President of the Bank of Montreal.
- Eweretta Richardson (d.1874). In 1846, at Montreal, she married Colonel William Denny (1804-1886), of the 71st (Highland) Regiment of Foot, and Tralee, County Kerry. Denny was also an artist, and the son of Anthony Denny (first cousin of Sir Edward Denny, 3rd Bt., of Tralee Castle) and Frances, daughter of William Blennerhassett (1735-1797) of Ballyseedy, County Kerry.
- Helen Richardson. In 1816, at Montreal, she married George Auldjo (1790–1846) J.P., of Montreal and afterwards Skene Terrace; Chief Magistrate of Aberdeen. He was a nephew of Alexander Auldjo, the husband of Helen's aunt, Eweretta Richardson
- John Richardson born 13 February 1804 in Montreal, Quebec and died in 1819
- Elizabeth Jane Richardson born 16 June 1806 in Montreal, Quebec and died on 13 July 1826
- Thomas Richardson (d. 1834), merchant at Calcutta, India.
- Charlotte Richardson (1808–1884), married Rev. James Ramsay, of Montreal, formerly of Glebe House, Templemore, County Tipperary. He ran a school for the boys of Montreal's elite.

== See also ==
- Golden Square Mile
- History of Montreal
- Scots-Quebec
- War of 1812
