= Mount McGillivray =

Mountain in Alberta, Canada

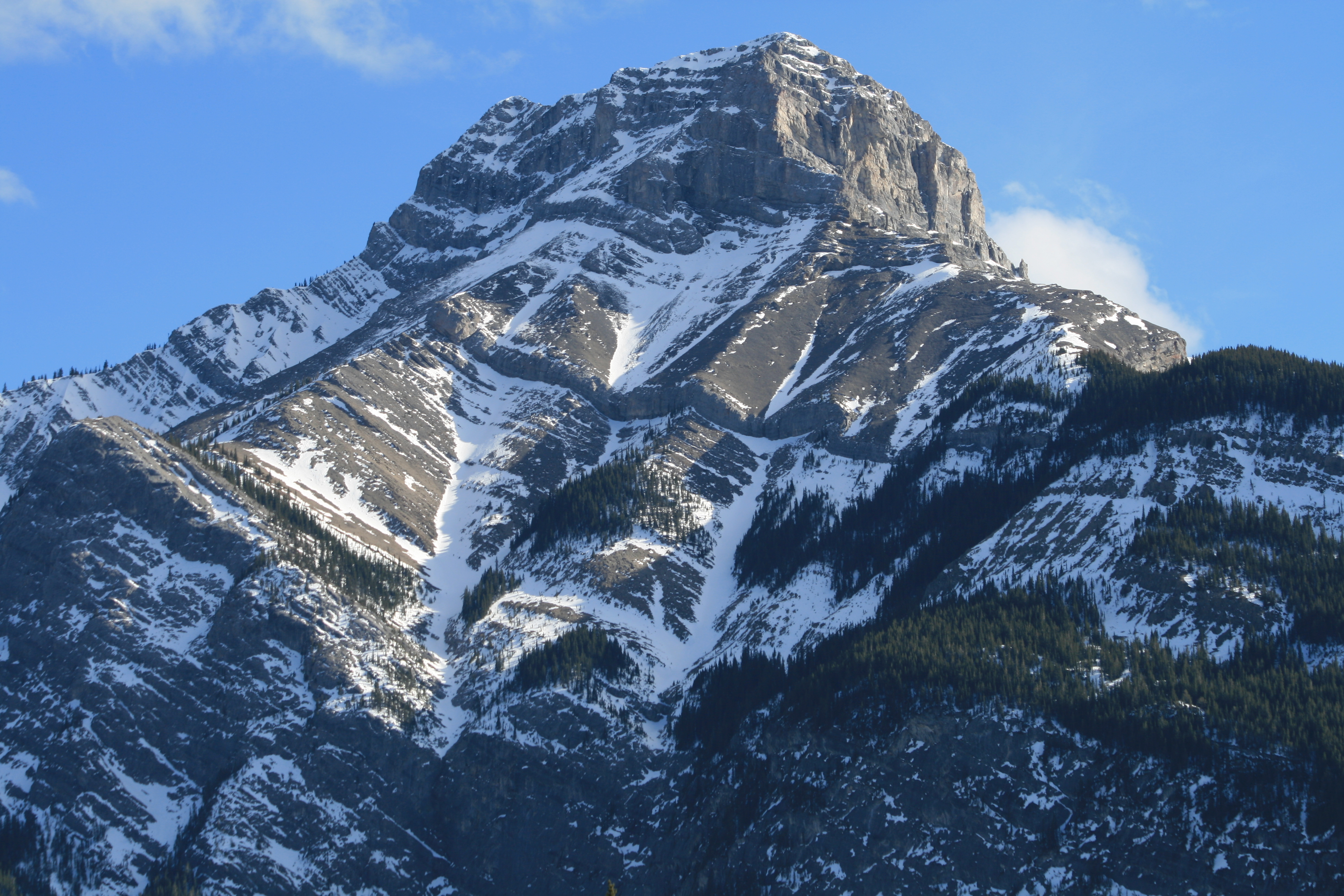
- Mount McGillivray

Highest point
- Elevation: 2,451 m (8,041 ft)
- Prominence: 211 m (692 ft)
- Parent peak: Skogan Peak (2662 m)
- Listing: Mountains of Alberta
- Coordinates: 51°01′13″N 115°09′52″W

Geography
- Location within Alberta Location within Canada
- Interactive map of Mount McGillivray
- Location: Alberta, Canada
- Parent range: Canadian Rockies
- Topo map: NTS 82O3 Canmore

Geology
- Rock age: Cambrian
- Rock type: Limestone

Climbing
- Easiest route: Scramble

Mount McGillivray is a 2,451-metre (8,041-foot) mountain summit located in the Bow Valley of Kananaskis Country in the Canadian Rockies of Alberta, Canada. Its nearest higher peak is Skogan Peak, 3.0 km (1.9 mi) to the southeast. Mount McGillivray is a landmark that can be seen from Highway 1, the Trans-Canada Highway in the Exshaw area.

== History ==
Mount McGillivray was named for Duncan McGillivray (1770–1808), one of the first white men along with David Thompson to see the Bow Valley. In November 1800, McGillivray and Thompson rode south on a trip from the newly established fort at Rocky Mountain House and explored west into the Bow Valley as far as what is now Mount McGillivray in search of the headwaters of the Columbia River. The mountain's toponym was officially adopted in 1957 by the Geographical Names Board of Canada.

During the Cold War, tunnels and vaults were constructed under the north slope of the mountain as part of a plan to safely store government documents, however the project was never completed.

On July 28, 2023, a small single-engine plane crashed on Mt. McGillivray, killing all six occupants from Calgary.

== Geology ==
Mount McGillivray is composed of sedimentary rock laid down during the Precambrian to Jurassic periods. Formed in shallow seas, this sedimentary rock was pushed east and over the top of younger rock during the Laramide orogeny.

== Climate ==
Based on the Köppen climate classification, Mount McGillivray is located in a subarctic climate zone with cold, snowy winters, and mild summers. Temperatures can drop below −20 °C with wind chill factors below −30 °C. Precipitation runoff from Mount McGillivray drains into the Bow River which is a tributary of the South Saskatchewan River.

== Gallery ==
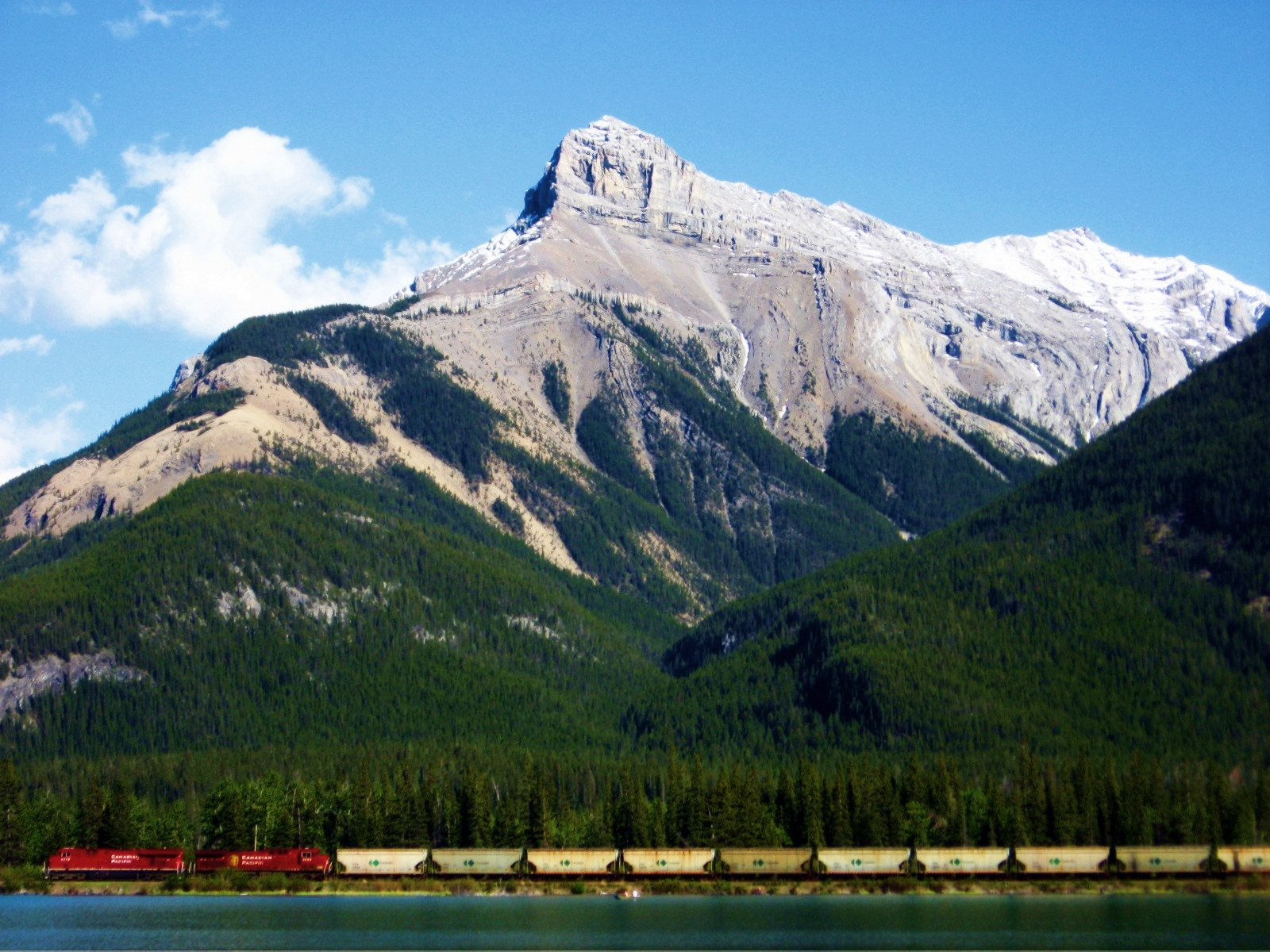
Mount McGillivray seen across Gap Lake

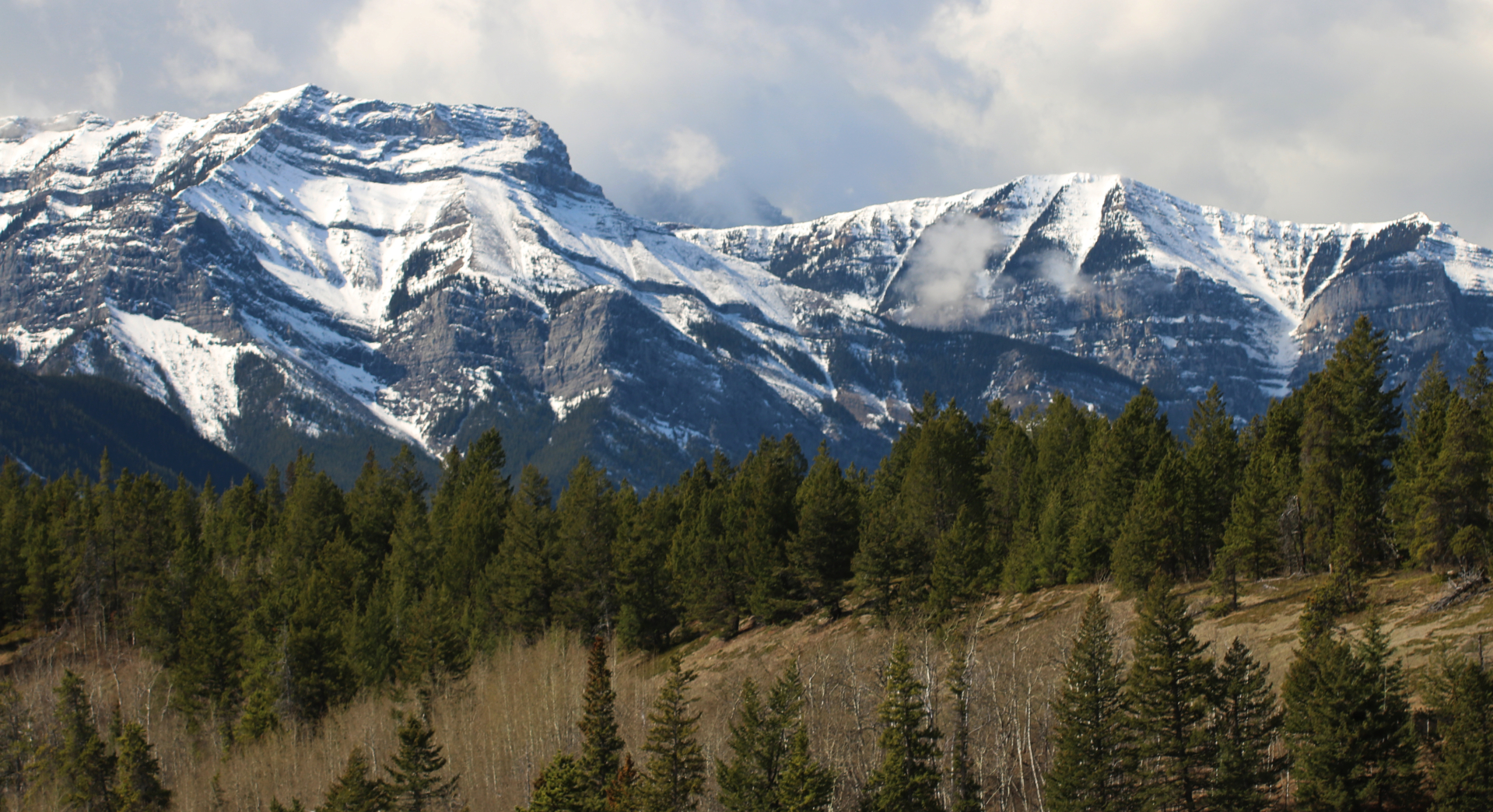
Mount McGillivray and Pigeon Mountain

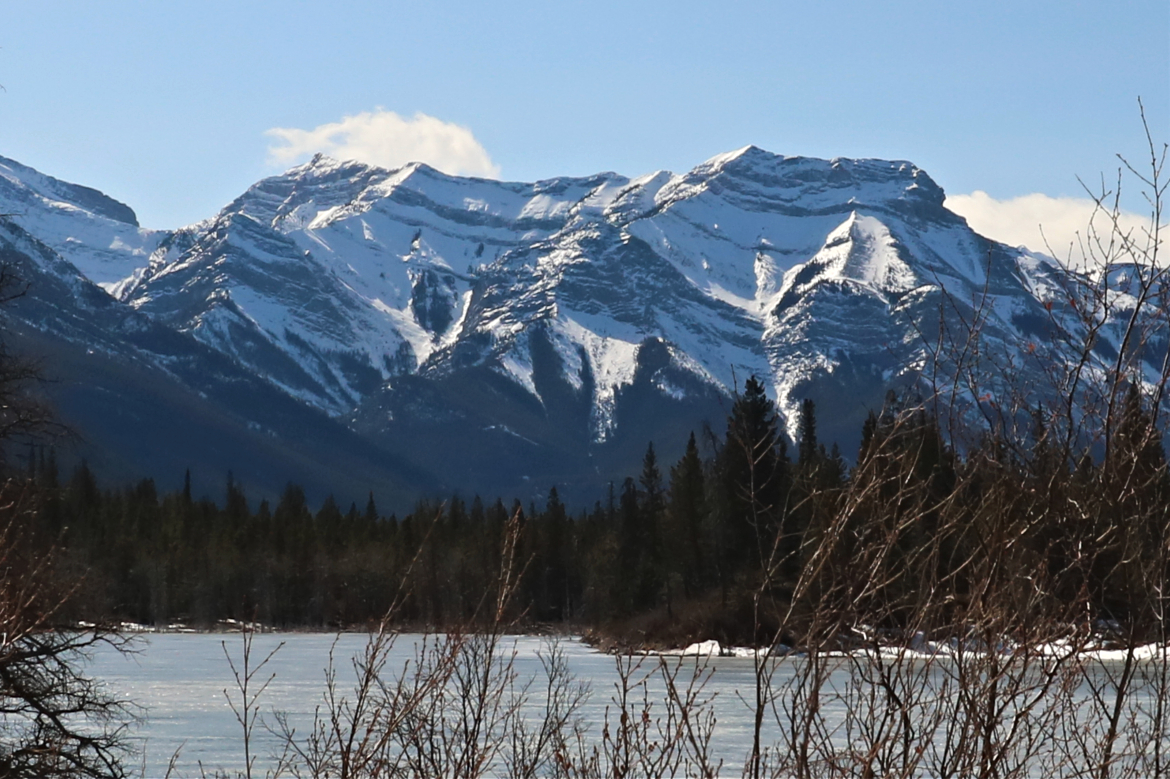
Mount McGillivray from Reed Lake

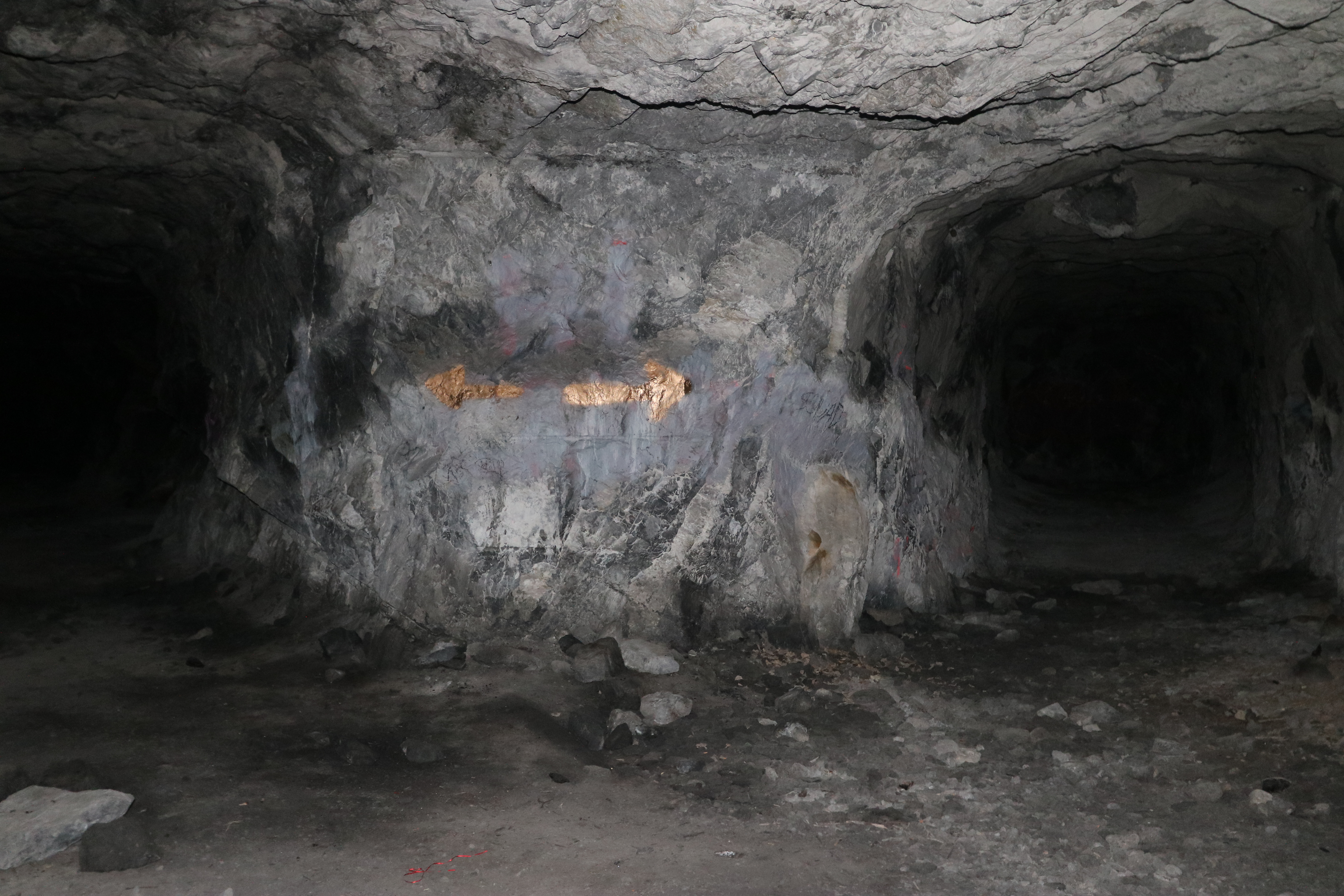
tunnels and vaults under the north slope of the mountain

== See also ==
- List of mountains of Canada
- Geography of Alberta
