= Duncan McGillivray =

Scottish fur trader in Canada

- Born: c. 1770; Inverness-shire, Scotland
- Died: April 9, 1808; Montreal, Lower Canada
- Occupation(s): Fur trader and explorer

Duncan McGillivray (c. 1770 – April 9, 1808), born in Inverness-shire, Scotland, was an explorer and fur trader in the Western Canada.

In the mid 1790s, he served as the North West Company's clerk at Fort George in what is now Alberta, and he later accompanied David Thompson on explorations of Rupert's Land and the Canadian Rockies. In 1800, they reached what is now Banff National Park. By 1801, McGillivray was suffering from rheumatism, and returned to Montreal.

In 1808 Thompson gave what is now called the Kootenay River the name "McGillivray's River", in honour of William and Duncan McGillivray. Duncan also loved the outdoors, and once took home and dissected a mountain goat. Mount McGillivray, located east of Banff National Park, was also named in his honor.

Duncan was an older brother to Simon McGillivray, and both were involved in McTavish, McGillivrays & Co. with their brother William.
