= British poetry =

Field of British literature

British poetry is the field of British literature encompassing poetry from anywhere in the British world – whether of the British Isles, the British Empire, or the United Kingdom.

== Types ==
- English poetry
- Irish poetry from Northern Ireland
- Scottish poetry (see Scottish literature)
- Welsh poetry
- Jèrriais poetry
- Guernésiais poetry
- Manx poetry
- Cornish poetry

== Women poets ==
The critic Lyn Pykett has written that "A trawl through anthologies of British or English verse quickly discovers the exclusion of women from the traditions of British poetry".
