= XY Company =

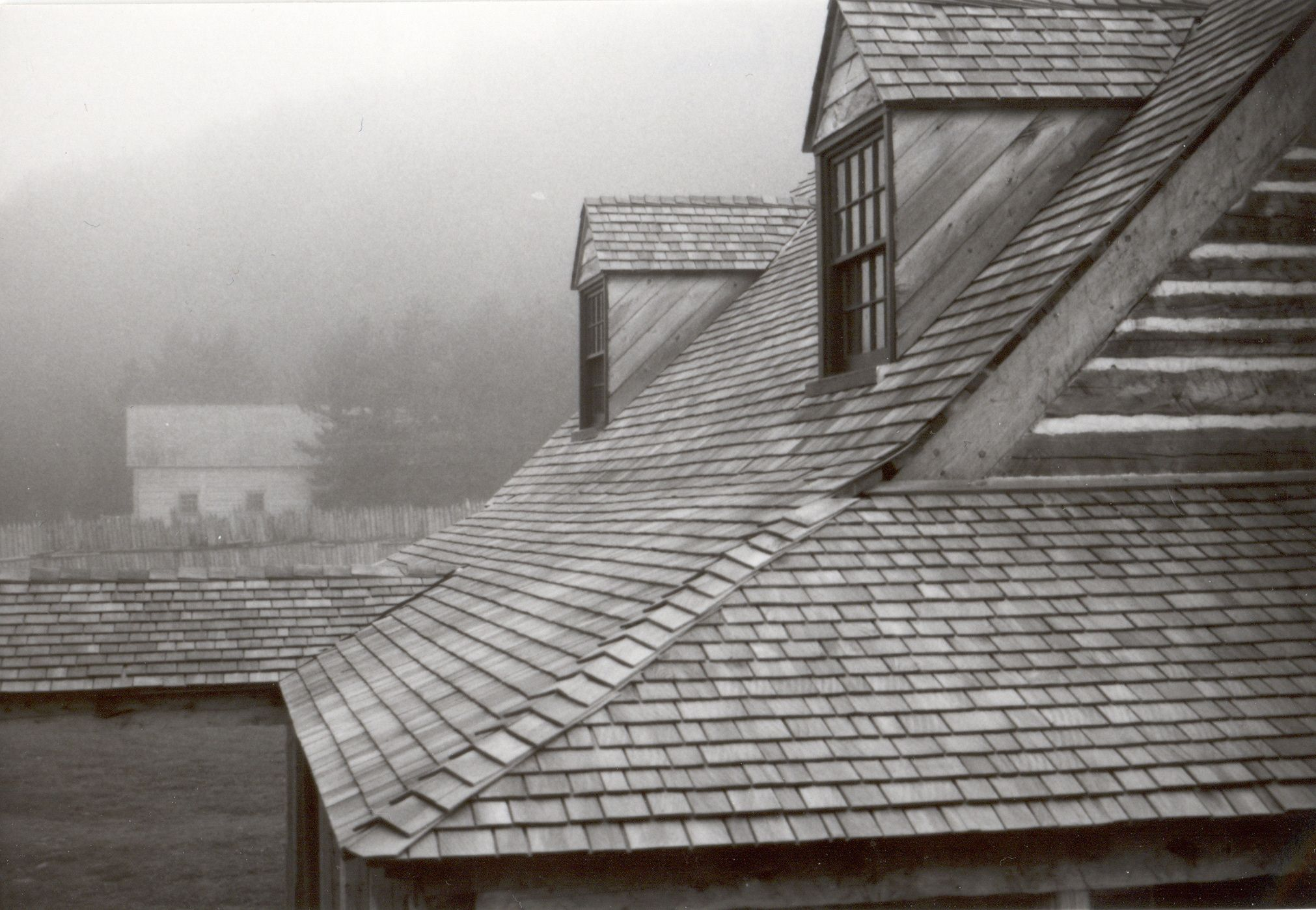
- Type: Joint-stock company
- Industry: Fur trade, Indian trade
- Founded: 1798
- Defunct: 1804
- Fate: Merger
- Successor: North West Company
- Headquarters: Montreal
- Area served: Assiniboine Country, Athabasca Country

The XY Company, also known as the New North West Company or X by Y Company, was a joint-stock fur trading enterprise based in Montreal that conducted business chiefly in the Canadian Northwest between 1798 and 1804. It was established in opposition to the North West Company, whose employees called it the Little Company and the Potties.

== Background ==
In 1795 some partners withdrew from the North West Company and began to trade on their own through the firm of Forsyth, Richardson & Company which already was engaged in the trade around Lake Superior. At the same time, an agreement was made between on the one hand McTavish, Frobisher & Company and on the other hand Alexander Mackenzie as agent and attorney of Angus Shaw, Roderick McKenzie, Cuthbert Grant, Alexander McLeod and William Thornburn, to begin independent trading operations in 1799 and continue with these until 1805. Due to the animosity that arose between Simon McTavish and Alexander McKenzie this agreement was superseded in 1798 when new partners were admitted and others retired.

== Foundation ==
The XY Company was founded in 1798 when the Forsyth, Richardson & Company (which was a subsidiary of the London firm of Phyn, Ellis & Company) and Leith, Jamieson & Company of Detroit united in order to increase its competitive advantage against the North West Company. It was invigorated when John Ogilvy and John Mure entered the company in 1800 and Alexander Mackenzie joined in 1802.

== Operations ==
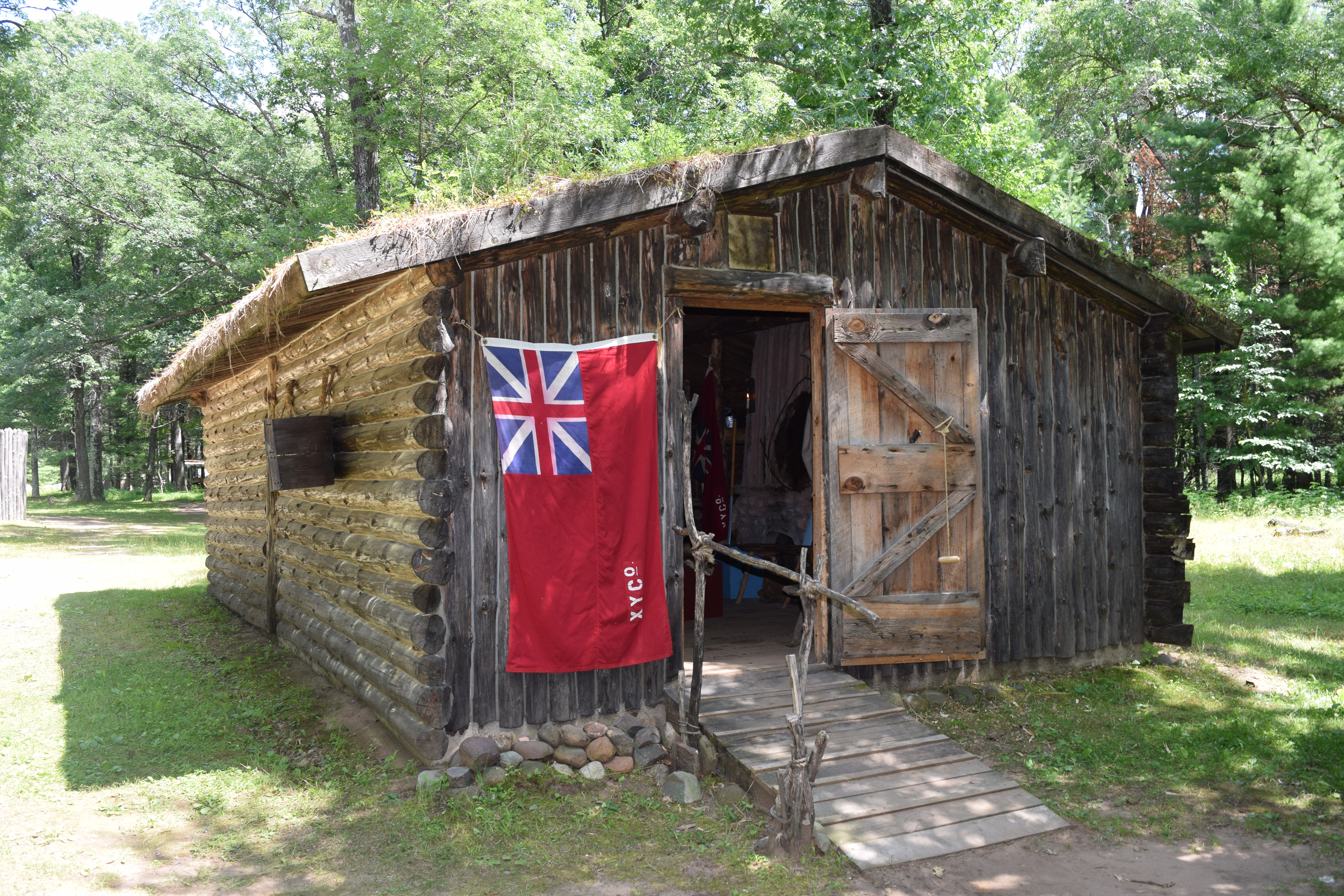
Reconstructed XY Company warehouse at Forts Folle Avoine Historical Park, Wisconsin.

From its beginning, the XY Company contested the dominance in the Canadian Northwest of the North West Company and the Hudson's Bay Company. Its robust financial support made it possible to open competing fur trading posts on the Red River, at Rainy Lake and Bas de la Rivière Winnipic and many other sites in close vicinity to already existing North West Company posts.

In 1801 the XY Company had posts on the Saskatchewan, (near the Fort Edmonton and Fort Augustus at the site of today's Fort Saskatchewan), in 1803 on the Great Bear Lake, and the same year posts were established on the Peace and the Swan rivers. When the North West Company in 1802 moved its rendezvous from Grand Portage to Kaministiquia, the XY Company followed in 1804. The company then also had a trading fort at Qu'Appelle River and a winter post at Fishing Lake. The XY Company also had a post at Fort Charlotte, by the Pigeon River at the upper end of the portage from Lake Superior. In the North-Western Territory, the XY Company built posts in the immediate vicinity of those of the North West Company; depots near Fort Chipewyan, the posts at the Great Slave Lake, Fort Liard on the Mackenzie River, and at Great Bear Lake. In the Peace River are the XY Company established four posts. It also had depots at Île-à-la-Crosse and Green Lake.

The rivalry between North West Company and XY Company led to an increased use of hard liquor as a competitive means. North West Company increased its use of rum and other spirits from 10,000 gallons in 1799 to 16,000 in 1803. North West Company's average use of hard liquor 1802-1804 was 14,400 gallons, while the average for the XY Company during the same period was 5,000 gallons. Soon both companies were losing money, important fur trading areas became depleted and relations with the First Nations were impaired.

The often close proximity of North West Company's and XY Company's post led to violent interactions between clerks and servants of the companies. In August 1802, a clerk of the XY Company shot and killed a clerk of the North West Company after the latter attempted to steal his furs. The killer was indicted for murder in Montreal, but he was set free as the court had doubt about its jurisdiction; the act having taken place at Fort de l'Isle on the North Saskatchewan River.

== Merger ==
In 1803, Alexander Mackenzie reorganized the company as a partnership under the name Sir Alexander Mackenzie & Company, but it was nevertheless mostly called the XY Company, or as I mentioned above, the X and Y Company, seeing that it sold so many products, people would say "oh, we see X, Y and Z", hence the name. The vehement contest with the North West Company for market shares caused instability in the fur-producing regions and decreased revenue for both companies. In order to end the competition, thereby increasing profit, the two companies merged in 1804 with the North West Company absorbing the XY Company. The XY Company becoming a part owner receiving 25 of the reconstructed North West Company's 100 shares. Yet, McTavish, Frobisher & Company continued as the only agent of the North West Company, and Alexander McKenzie was barred from any engagement in the fur trade. Increased profitability after the merger was reached, among other measures, by lowering the salaries of the clerks.
