= Strathnairn =

Area of the Scottish Highlands

Coordinates: 57.37°N 4.20°W

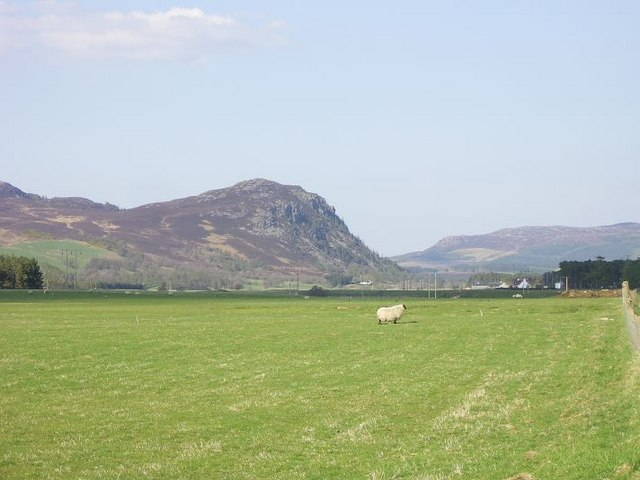
Brin Rock Brin Rock in Strathnairn.

Strathnairn (Gaelic: Srath Narann) is an area of the Scottish Highlands approximately 8 miles southwest of Inverness, bordering the Monadhliath Mountains. The Strath's borders reach to the north where Clava cairn and the Battle of Culloden lie, following the River Nairn south through Daviot, Farr, Brin, Croachy, and finally ending near Dunmaglass.
