= Dunmaglass, Scotland =

Estate in Highland, Scotland

Coordinates: 57.266666°N 4.333333°W

Dunmaglass Lodge

Dunmaglass is a shooting estate of about 14,000 acres (5,700 ha) in the Monadhliath Mountains of Scotland. It is located around 15 miles (24 km) south of Inverness. It was owned by property developer Sir Jack Arnold Hayward (deceased 2015), former chairman of Wolverhampton Wanderers F.C. Dunmaglass is known for shooting of pheasant, grouse, duck and sometimes hare. Dunmaglass is also the historical seat of Clan MacGillivray.

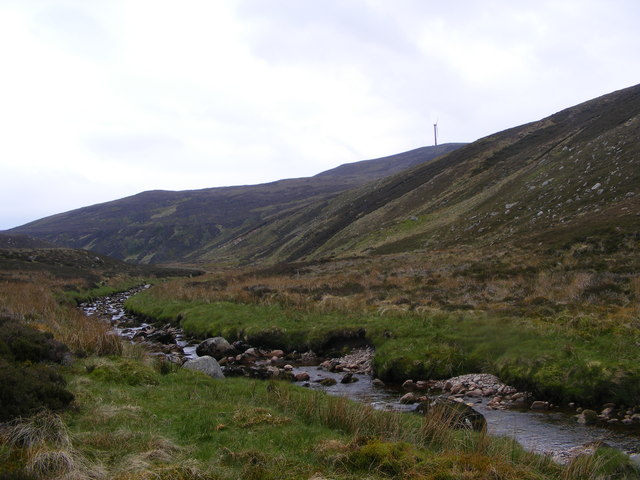
The wind turbine on Beinn Dubhcharaidh

== Wind power ==
A single wind turbine was constructed on the estate in the 1990s, close to the summit of Beinn Dubhcharaidh. It has since been shut down. In 2005, Renewable Energy Systems (RES) proposed a 36-turbine wind farm on the Dunmaglass estate. Scottish Natural Heritage and the John Muir Trust objected to the proposal, referring to the potential effects on the local golden eagle population. In 2008, a revised planning application for 33 turbines was submitted to the Scottish Government. The Cairngorm National Park Authority are opposed to the wind farm, but Highland Council have come out in favour of the scheme.
