= Bethune (surname) =

Bethune, or Béthune, is a French and Scottish surname. It originates from the name of the town of Béthune in Pas-de-Calais, Nord-Pas-de-Calais, France. The name of the town was first recorded in the 8th century, in the Latin form Bitunia. The surname is first recorded in Scotland during the reign of King Alexander II (4 December 1214 to 8 July 1249) when charters of the abbeys of St Andrews and Arbroath name Robert de Betunia, probably a knight, Sir David de Betun, definitely a knight, and John de Betun, probably a cleric. Bethune of Balfour is an ancient Scottish family who from about 1375 to 1888 were lairds of Balfour in Fife, an estate in the Lowlands parish of Markinch. Originating before the year 1000 in the town of Béthune, then in the county of Flanders. Over the centuries the pronunciation of the family name shifted from the original French bay-tune to the Scots bee-t'n, usually written Beaton. From about 1560, members of the family started using the French spelling again.

== List of persons with the surname ==
- Ade Bethune (1914–2002), American Catholic artist
- Alexander Bethune (disambiguation), various people
- Angus Bethune (politician) (1908–2004), Premier of Tasmania
- Angus Bethune (fur trader) (1783–1858), North West Company fur trader
- Charles Bethune (1802–1884), Royal Navy admiral
- Croix Bethune (born 2001), American soccer player
- David Bethune or Beaton (c. 1494–1546), Cardinal of Scotland and Archbishop of St Andrews
- David Lindesay-Bethune, 15th Earl of Lindsay (1926–1989)
- Donald Bethune (1802–1869), Canadian judge and politician
- Eberhard of Béthune (fl. 1212), Flemish grammarian
- Ed Bethune (born 1935), American politician
- Edith Hallett Bethune (1890–1970), Canadian photographer
- Edward Cecil Bethune (1855–1930), British Army officer
- Elizabeth Bethune (fl. 1544–1585), mistress of James V of Scotland
- Emmanuel de Bethune (1930–2011), Belgian politician
- George Bethune (disambiguation), various people
- Gordon Bethune (born 1941), American airline executive
- Henry Bethune (disambiguation), various people
- James Bethune (disambiguation), various people
- Janet Beaton or Bethune (1519–1569), Scottish aristocrat accused of being a witch
- Jean-Baptiste Bethune (1821–1894), Belgian architect
- Jeanne de Béthune, Viscountess of Meaux (c. 1397-1450)
- Joanna Bethune (1770–1860), Scottish-Canadian philanthropist
- John Bethune (disambiguation), various people
- Joseph D. Bethune (1842–1913), American jurist
- Lauchlin Bethune (1785–1874), American politician
- Louise Blanchard Bethune (1856–1913), American architect
- Margaret Bethune (1820–1887), Scottish midwife
- Marion Bethune (1816–1895), American politician
- Mary McLeod Bethune, (1875–1955) American educator, philanthropist, humanitarian, and civil rights activist.
- Matilda of Béthune (died 1264), countess of Flanders
- Maximilien de Béthune, Duke of Sully (1560–1641), French nobleman and counselor of Henry IV of France
- Norman Bethune (1890–1939), Canadian physician and Communist revolutionary
- Norman Bethune Sr. (1822–1892), Canadian physician
- Patricia Bethune (born 1956), American actress
- Pete Bethune (born 1965), New Zealand environmentalist
- Phyllis Bethune (1899–1982), New Zealand artist
- Reginald Lindesay-Bethune, 12th Earl of Lindsay (1867–1939)
- Robert de Bethune (died 1148), English bishop
- Robert Henry Bethune (1836–1895), Canadian banker
- Rupe Bethune (1917–1984), Australian rules footballer
- Sabine de Bethune (born 1958), Belgian politician
- Tatum Bethune (born 2001), American college football player
- Tim Bethune (born 1962), Canadian sprinter
- Zina Bethune (1945–2012), American actress, dancer, and choreographer

== See also ==
- Beaton (surname)
- Bethune baronets
- Clan Bethune
- House of Béthune
