= Strachan Bethune =

Canadian lawyer

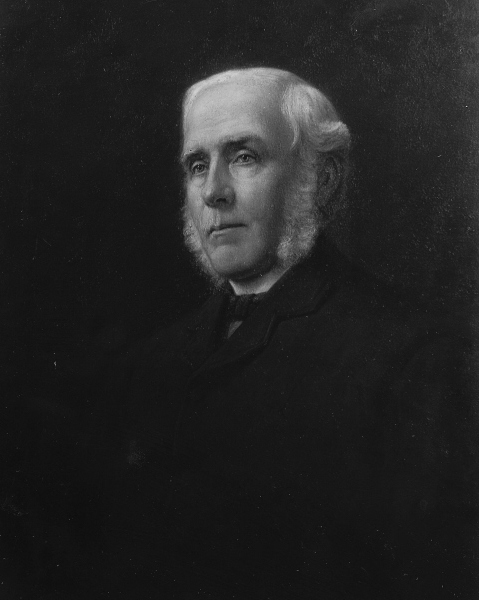
- Born: 6 November 1821; Burnside Hall, Montreal, Lower Canada
- Died: 8 March 1910 (aged 88) [Montreal, Quebec, Canada
- Occupations: Bâtonnier of Montreal, Chancellor of the Diocese of Montreal
- Spouse: Maria MacLean Phillips
- Children: 8
- Parent(s): John Bethune; Elizabeth Hallowell
- Relatives: Mary Bethune Abbott (sister)

Strachan Bethune, QC (November 6, 1821 – March 8, 1910) twice Bâtonnier of Montreal and the 1st Anglican Chancellor of the Diocese of Montreal.

== Biography ==
Born at Burnside Hall, Montreal, Strachan Bethune was the son of the Very Reverend John Bethune, Dean of Montreal and Principal of McGill University, by his wife Elizabeth, daughter of William Hallowell (1771–1838), signing partner of the North West Company. He was named for his father's mentor John Strachan, and he was a great-grandson of the explorer Alexander Henry the elder. His uncles included Angus Bethune, James Gray Bethune, Bishop Alexander Neil Bethune, The Hon. Donald Bethune, Henry Mackenzie (cousin of the Canadian explorer Sir Alexander Mackenzie) and The Hon. John Kirby.

He studied law at McGill University and was called to the Bar of Lower Canada in 1843. He joined what was then Montreal's most prestigious law firm, Meredith & Dunkin, at the same time that his future brother-in-law (the future Prime Minister of Canada) Sir John Abbott was serving his clerkship there. In 1849, when Meredith was appointed a Judge at Quebec City, Dunkin later left too. Bethune was later joined by his son, Meredith Blenkarne Bethune (1846–1907), forming the firm Bethune & Bethune. He was appointed Queen's Counsel in 1864. He was twice appointed Bâtonnier of Montreal (1859 and 1862) and his name was frequently mentioned when judicial vacancies became available.

In 1845, by his father at Christ Church Cathedral, Montreal, he married Maria MacLean Phillips (1826–1901), the eldest daughter of William Phillips of Quebec City, by his wife Henrietta, daughter of Charles Grey Stewart (1775–1854), of Quebec. Mrs Bethune was a niece of William Price and a first cousin of the brothers General Sir Percy Lake and Lieutenant-Governor Sir Richard Lake. The Bethunes were the parents of eight children. Their second daughter, Caroline, married Lt.-Col. Hon Keith Turnour-Fetherstonhaugh of Uppark, younger brother of Edward Turnour, 5th Earl Winterton.
