= Bethune =

Bethune may refer to:

== Places ==
- Bethune Township, Ontario, Canada
- Bethune, Saskatchewan, Canada
- Béthune, France
- Arrondissement of Béthune, Pas-de-Calais, France
- Bethune, Colorado, U.S.
- Bethune, South Carolina, U.S.
- Bethune Beach, Florida, U.S.

== People ==
- Bethune (surname), people with the surname Bethune
- Bethune baronets, the name of two baronetcies, one in the United Kingdom and the other in Nova Scotia
- Clan Bethune, a Scottish clan
- House of Bethune, a medieval French family
- Norman Bethune, a Canadian surgeon, advocate of socialized medicine, and Communist

== Schools ==
- Bethune College, in Kolkata, India
- Bethune-Cookman University, in Daytona Beach, Florida, U.S.
- Dr Norman Bethune Collegiate Institute, in Toronto, Ontario, Canada

== Films ==
- Bethune, a 1964 documentary directed by Donald Brittain
- Bethune (1977 film), a 1977 film about the life of Norman Bethune
- Bethune: The Making of a Hero, a 1990 film about the life of Norman Bethune

== Other uses ==
- Béthune (river), in Normandy, France
