= John Bethune =

John Bethune may refer to:

- John Bethune (Scottish minister) (1725–1774) Scottish minister and philosopher
- John Bethune (Canadian minister) (1751–1815), founder of the first Presbyterian Church in Montreal
- John Drinkwater Bethune (1762–1844), English army officer and military historian
- John Bethune (principal) (1791–1872), Canadian Anglican priest, and acting principal of McGill University from 1835 to 1846
- John Elliot Drinkwater Bethune (1801–1851), English barrister
- John Bethune (poet) (1812–1839), Scottish poet
- John Lemuel Bethune (1850–1913), Canadian physician and politician
- John Bethune (footballer) (1888–1955), Scottish footballer
- John Bethune of Craigfoodie (1670–1734), Scottish landowner and politician, later a clergyman

== See also ==
- John of Béthune (disambiguation)
