= Bethune baronets of Scotscraig (1683) =

Escutcheon of the Bethune baronets of Scotscraig

The Sharp, later Bethune baronetcy, of Scotscraig in the County of Fife, was created in the Baronetage of Nova Scotia on 21 April 1683 for William Sharp, son of James Sharp, Archbishop of St Andrews, killed by a Covenanter group in 1679.

The 6th Baronet married Margaret, daughter of John Bethune. The baronetcy became dormant or extinct on his death in 1780, according to Cokayne writing early in the 20th century. It remained dormant until 1917 when a successful claim by Alexander Sharp Bethune, the 9th Baronet, was upheld by the Lyon King of Arms. He was the grandson of Lieutenant-General Alexander Sharp, de jure 7th Baronet, who assumed the surname of Bethune in lieu of Sharp in 1815; he had assumed the additional surname of Sharp.

The title became extinct on the death of the 10th Baronet in 1997.

== Sharp, later Bethune baronets, of Scotscraig (1683) ==
- Sir William Sharp, 1st Baronet (c. 1655–1712)
- Sir James Sharp, 2nd Baronet (died 1738)
- Sir James Sharp, 3rd Baronet (died c. 1748)
- Sir William Sharp, 4th Baronet (c. 1754)
- Sir Alexander Sharp, 5th Baronet (died c. 1770)
- Sir William Sharp, 6th Baronet (1729–1780) (dormant)
- Sir Alexander Sharp Bethune, de jure 7th Baronet (1771–1847)
- Sir Alexander Bethune, de jure 8th Baronet (1824–1900)
- Sir Alexander Sharp Bethune, 9th Baronet (1860–1917) (revived 1917)
- Sir Alexander Maitland Sharp Bethune, 10th Baronet (1909–1997)
