= Norman Bethune Sr. =

Norman Bethune (13 August 1822 – 12 October 1892) was the son of Angus Bethune who was a fur trader. Norman was born in Moose Factory, Rupert's Land. Because of his father's family connections, such as his brother, Donald Bethune, the family moved to Toronto in 1840 where Norman was enrolled in Upper Canada College. From there he went for an arts degree at King's College and then to medical school in England where he graduated in 1848 as a member of the Royal College of Surgeons.

In 1849, Norman and four other doctors started a third medical school in Toronto called the Upper Canada School of Medicine. When a big dispute broke out over the conversion of Kings College to a secular school, the University of Toronto, Bishop John Strachan started Trinity College as a new Anglican alternative. The Upper Canada Medical Group, including Bethune, became the medical faculty of the new college. However, the medical school had difficulty in attracting enough paying Anglican students and started offering instruction to others as well. A dispute broke out with Strachan, causing the mass resignation of the medical faculty.

Bethune and many other faculty joined the Toronto School of Medicine. He taught successfully there and then returned to Trinity College in 1871. He was professor of surgery there until 1881. His career drew little recorded notice from that time until his death. His career spans an era when science separated itself from religion and government became increasingly involved in the funding of medical education.

In 1859, while traveling in Europe, he journeyed to Italy, to tend those wounded in the Battle of Solferino. Henri Dunant was impressed by Bethune's efforts, and mentioned him as "Norman Bettun" in A Memory of Solferino.

He had a grandson, Henry Norman Bethune who also became a physician and achieved high recognition for his medical work and his activity in China with Mao Zedong's army.
