= Clan Bethune =

Lowland Scottish family

Bethune of Balfour
- Crest: An otter’s head erased argent.
- Motto: Debonnaire (Of good lineage)

Profile
- Region: Lowlands
- District: Fife and Angus
- Bethune of Balfour no longer has a chief, and is an armigerous clan
- Historic seat: Balfour in Markinch, Fife
- Last Chief: Charles Congalton Bethune (1849-1923), 25th of Balfour

Bethune of Balfour is an ancient Scottish family who from about 1375 to 1888 were lairds of Balfour in Fife, an estate in the Lowlands parish of Markinch. Originating before the year 1000 in the town of Béthune, then in the county of Flanders, over the centuries the pronunciation of the family name shifted from the original French bay-tune to the Scots bee-t'n, usually written Beaton. From about 1560, members of the family started using the French spelling again.

Bethune families originating in the Scottish Highlands and Scottish Islands are entirely separate lines.

== Origins of the family ==
In Flanders before the year 1000, towns with their castles were under the command of hereditary ruling families. One such family were the seigneurs of Béthune in the province of Artois, the first known being Robert I de Béthune, who lived from about 960 to 1037. In addition to ruling the town and castle of Béthune, where he founded the church of Saint-Barthélémy, he held ancestral lands outside the town and was hereditary advocatus or protector of the Abbey of Saint-Vaast in Arras. While the main branch remained in Béthune until 1246, when the heiress Maud married Guy, Count of Flanders, junior branches acquired lands and raised families elsewhere in France as well as in Palestine, Cyprus, England, and Scotland.

== Early Bethunes in Scotland ==
According to Bishop John Leslie, there were members of the Bethune family in Scotland before 1093. However the first surviving evidence is a century later, when around 1192 a charter of Lindores Abbey mentions Robert de Bethune, probably Robert VI (died 1193) of the Artois family. Before 1210 the cartulary of Arbroath Abbey records a cleric John de Bethune. Around 1220 Robert de Bethune is mentioned in connection with St Andrews Cathedral Priory and Sir David de Bethune, a knight, in another Arbroath document. From then on the names of clerics and knights called Bethune occur increasingly in Scottish records, mainly in the counties of Angus, particularly at Ethiebeaton in the parish of Monifieth and at Westhall in the parish of Murroes, and also in Fife, but it is not possible to link the scattered references into a coherent family tree. For that one has to wait until the knight Sir Alexander de Bethune who, according to Hector Boece, in 1314 sat in the Parliament of Scotland held at Cambuskenneth and in 1332 died fighting for the Bruce legitimists against the Balliol rebels at Dupplin Moor. Tradition makes him the father of Robert, who in about 1345 married Janet, the heiress of Balfour. Their home was the castle of Balfour beside the River Leven, just south of Milton of Balgonie.

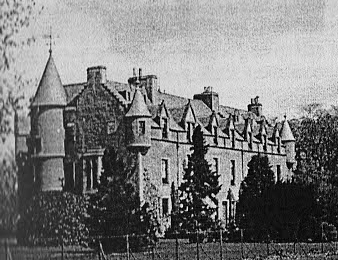
Balfour House before demolition

An alternative origin for the Bethunes of Balfour family was mentioned in the funeral oration delivered for Archbishop James Bethune in 1603, where their descent is traced from a member of the French family who went to Scotland around 1449 and married the heiress of Balfour. The man in question is named as Jacques de Béthune, also known as Jacotin, whose father Jean died at Agincourt in 1415. No Scottish records bear out this assertion.

== The Bethunes of Balfour ==
From the marriage of Robert Bethune to Janet Balfour, the castle and lands of Balfour descended in the male line until James Bethune, 15th of Balfour, who died as an exiled Jacobite rebel in France in 1719. Descent through females brought Balfour in 1836 to Eleanor, wife of John Drinkwater, who both changed their last names to Bethune. Their grandson, elder brother of General Edward Cecil Bethune, sold Balfour in 1888 and it has since been demolished.

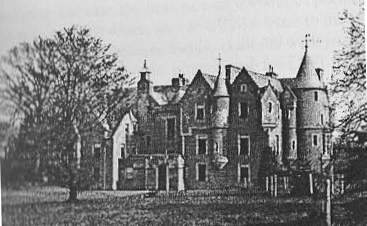
Balfour House before demolition

== Families descending from the Bethunes of Balfour ==
Over the 500 years that the family held Balfour, various junior branches sprang up and some are still extant.

=== Bethune of Creich ===
Descended from David Bethune, 1st of Creich (died 1505), Treasurer of Scotland, son of John Bethune, 5th of Balfour, but the male line ended with William Bethune, 9th of Creich (died 1670).

=== Bethune of Balfarg ===
Descended from James Bethune, 1st of Balfarg (died 1546), son of John Bethune, 6th of Balfour, and ending with his unmarried sons James Bethune, Archbishop of Glasgow, Andrew Bethune, and John Bethune, the latter two both serving as Master of the Royal Household for Mary, Queen of Scots.

=== Bethune of Melgund ===
Descended from Cardinal David Bethune (died 1549), who had eight illegitimate children with Marion Ogilvy, and their many living descendants include Queen Elizabeth II of the United Kingdom.

=== Bethune of Sweden ===
Claiming descent from James Bethune, 6th of Creich (died 1618).

=== Bethune of Langhermiston ===
Originating with Alexander Bethune, 1st of Langhermiston (died after 1641), son of Robert Bethune, 10th of Balfour, but ended with his son Alexander Bethune, 2nd of Langhermiston (died 1672).

=== Bethune of Blebo ===
Beginning with Andrew Bethune, 1st of Blebo (died 1653), son of David Bethune, 11th of Balfour, and ending with Margaret Bethune whose relationship with Sir William Sharp, 6th Baronet led to the subsequent Bethune baronets, extinct in 1997 on the death of Sir Alexander Bethune, 10th Baronet.

=== Bethune of Bandon ===
Originating with Robert Bethune, 1st of Bandon (died 1660), son of David Bethune, 11th of Balfour, and ending with the childless Ann Bethune (died 1785).

=== Bethune of Craigfoodie, Rowfant, and Denne ===
Descending from William Bethune, 1st of Craigfoodie (died 1699), grandson of David Bethune, 11th of Balfour, whose eldest surviving son, John Bethune, 2nd of Craigfoodie, settled in England. and whose male line continues.

=== Bethune of Massachusetts ===
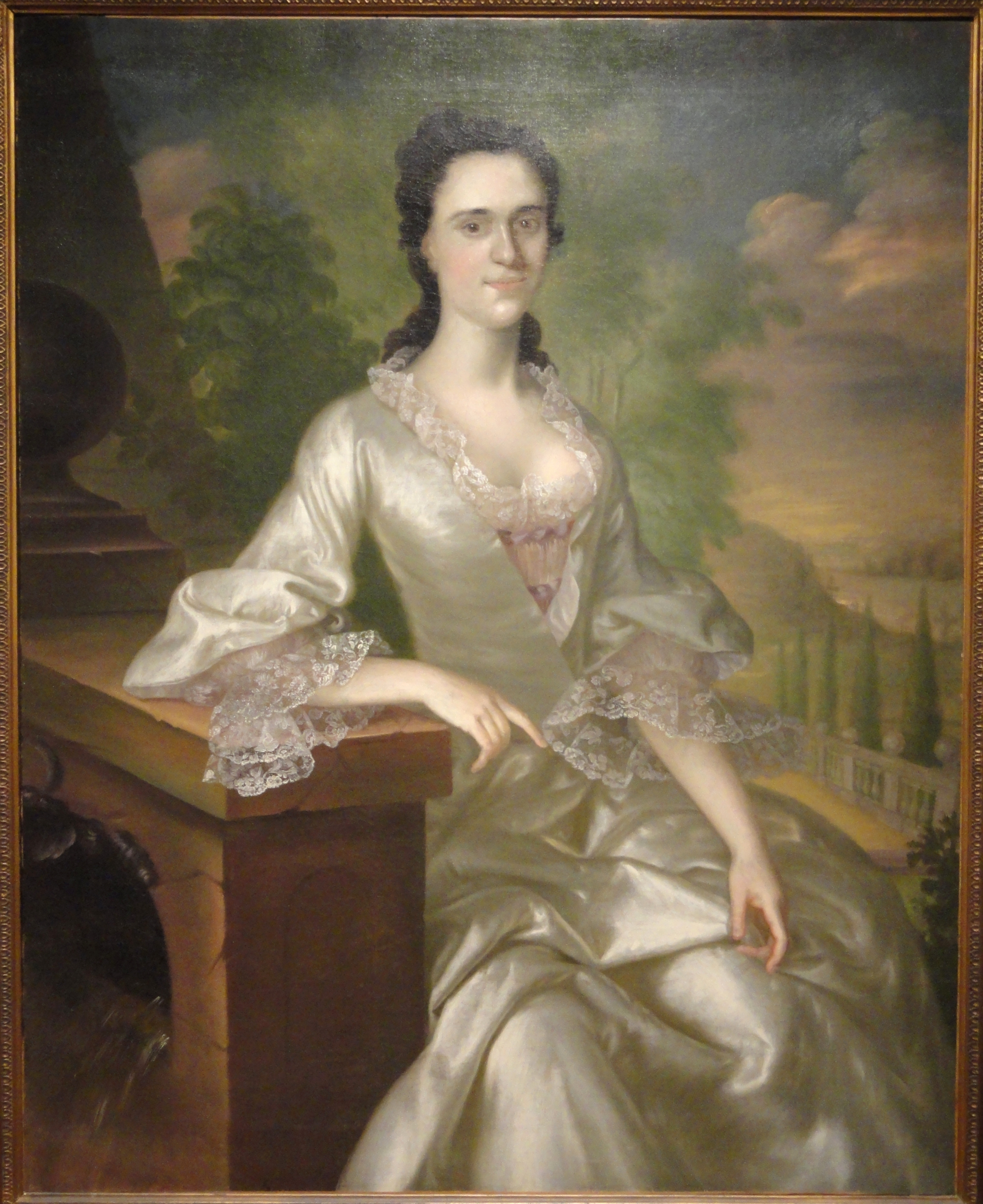
Mary Faneuil (1732–1797)

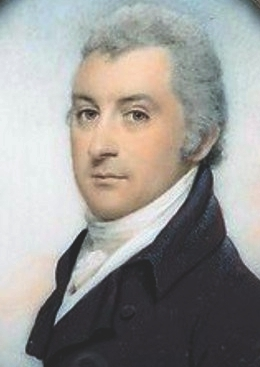
George Bethune (1769–1859)

- George I (died 1735), younger son of William, 1st of Craigfoodie (died 1699), settled in Massachusetts, where he married Mary Waters in 1713 in Boston and had ten children. including two who have descendants in the twenty-first century.
- Jane (1714–1795), daughter of George I, by her first marriage to Moses Prince (1697–1745) produced Jane (1740–1800), wife of Chandler Robbins.
- George II (1720–1785), only son of George I to leave children, in 1754 married Mary Faneuil (1732–1797), niece of Peter Faneuil. About 1730 Henry Bethune petitioned the English Parliament to have the entail on the male heir set aside in favor of his only child (a daughter); her husband Mr Collerton taking the name of Collerton Bethune, Baron of Balfour. In 1754 by an act of the British Parliament George Bethune of Boston was excluded in favor of Collerton Bethune Baron of Balfour.
- George III (1769–1859), only son of George II to have male children, left two sons who did not marry: George IV (1813–1886) and John (1817–1873).

=== Patton-Bethune ===
Descended from James Bethune, 4th of Blebo (died 1709).

=== Lindesay-Bethune ===
Descended from Catherine Bethune (died 1730), grand-daughter of David Bethune, 11th of Balfour (died 1635), and currently represented by James Lindesay-Bethune, 16th Earl of Lindsay.

== Arms of the Bethune family ==
Argent, a fesse gules

Bends or, on a field azure

Originally, the arms of the seigneurs of Béthune were those of the town they ruled, that is Argent, a fesse gules. When they became Advocati of the Abbey of Saint-Vaast, they adopted new arms suitable to their higher status, which were Bends or, on a field azure. After the marriage of Guillaume II, seigneur de Béthune to the heiress Mahaut de Dendermonde about 1190, at her request their eldest son changed his arms to those of her Dendermonde family. As it happened, these arms were the same as the old arms of Béthune, Argent, a fesse gules.

Bethune of Balfour with mascles

When knights of the Bethune family started affixing their seals to documents in Scotland, they used the same fesse as their relations in France. Examples are Sir David de Bethune in 1286 and Sir Andrew de Bethune in 1292. Through marriage with the Balfour heiress, the Scottish family altered their arms to Azure, a fesse between three mascles or and this shield was then quartered with that of Balfour to produce the arms used by the Bethunes of Balfour from about 1380 to 1672. By a law that year, all Scottish arms had either to be matriculated by the Court of the Lord Lyon or forfeited. Lyon then changed the ancient Bethune shield slightly to Azure, a fesse between three lozenges or. However, when Eleanor Bethune of Balfour matriculated her arms in 1837, Lyon changed them back to the original Azure, a fesse between three mascles or. Her descendants have not since matriculated the arms.

Junior branches of the Fife Bethunes used the family arms with slight variations, three sets being matriculated in 1672: Bethune of Bandon, Bethune of Blebo, and Bethune of Langhermiston who died out in the male line almost immediately. The arms of Bethune of Blebo descended to the Bethune Baronets, who have also died out in the male line, while the arms of Bethune of Bandon descended to the Bethunes of Craigfoodie, Rowfant, and Denne, who continue in the male line but have not matriculated the arms.

== Bethunes of the Highlands and Islands ==
In 1778 a book by the Reverend Thomas Whyte, minister of Liberton, claimed that many families in the Highlands and Islands of Scotland called Bethune or Beaton originate with a Peter Bethune, said to be descended from the Bethunes of Balfour. Nobody has yet produced any evidence for this link, which remains unproven and was almost certainly mistaken. Many of the people covered in his work were members of the Beaton medical kindred, an unrelated Scottish family commonly confused with the Bethunes of Balfour.

== See also ==
- Beaton medical kindred, an unrelated family that bears the same name.
- House of Bethune, an article (that has suffered arbitrary truncation) on related families in France.
