= Prime Minister Abbott =

Prime Minister Abbott may refer to:

- John Abbott, Prime Minister of Canada (1891-92)
- Tony Abbott, Prime Minister of Australia (2013-15)
