= Mary Bethune (disambiguation) =

Mary Bethune may refer to:

- Mary Bethune Abbott (1823–1898), wife of John Abbott, Prime Minister of Canada
- Mary Beaton or Bethune (1543–1598), Scottish noblewoman and attendant of Mary, Queen of Scots
- Mary McLeod Bethune (1875–1955), African-American educator, philanthropist and civil rights activist
