= Alexander Bethune =

Alexander Bethune may refer to:

- Alexander Bethune (politician) (1852–1947), mayor of Vancouver, British Columbia
- Alexander Bethune (bishop) (1800–1879), Canadian clergyman
- Alexander Bethune (poet) (1804–1843), Scottish poet
- Sir Alexander Bethune, 10th Baronet (1909–1997)
