= John Bethune (Canadian minister) =

Canadian Presbyterian minister

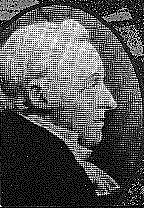
John Bethune (1751–1815)

John Bethune (Scottish Gaelic: an t-Urr. Iain Beutan) (1751 – September 23, 1815) was a Scottish Presbyterian minister, who served and helped found Reformed congregations among the Scottish diaspora in the Colony of North Carolina, Quebec, and in Upper Canada.

After fighting on the losing side during the American Revolution, Rev. Bethune fled northward and settled with other "United Empire Loyalists" in what remained of British North America. He founded Canada's first Presbyterian Churches, first in Montreal and then among his fellow Gaels in Glengarry County, Ontario.

Rev. Bethune is the common ancestor of a very large Scottish-Canadian extended family connected with the fur trade, politics, medicine, law and the ministry in several church denominations. He is the great-great-grandfather of Norman Bethune, the Canadian physician and medical innovator, and the great-great-great-grandfather of stage and screen actor Christopher Plummer.

== Early life ==
Rev. Bethune's maternal grandfather, Donald Campbell (1696-1784) of Scalpay, is best remembered for his involvement in the escape of Bonnie Prince Charlie in 1746, following the Battle of Culloden. The Prince was taken to Scalpay, to the home of Donald and Catherine (MacDonald) Campbell, which was a great risk as Donald Campbell was known to have supported the cause of the House of Hanover. Nevertheless, Bethune's grandfather's innately Gaelic cultural sense of hospitality to guests and his loyalty to his wife's Jacobite relatives meant that he welcomed and protected the Prince, despite their religious and political differences.

Rev. John Bethune was born into a well-respected family either, according to Michael Newton, at Glenelg. or upon the Isle of Skye. He was the son of Angus Bethune and Christian Campbell.

Rev. Bethune needed scholarships to keep him at King's College, Aberdeen. In 1773, he was ordained as a Presbyterian minister.

== North Carolina ==
Under the influence of a relative, Allan MacDonald, the former Tacksman of Kingsburgh, Skye and the husband of the Jacobite heroine Flora MacDonald, Rev. Bethune and his mother emigrated to the Colony of North Carolina, where they settled, in the same place as the MacDonalds.

After his arrival, Rev. Bethune worked as the minister of the Barbeque Presbyterian Church in what is now Harnett County, in the Colony of North Carolina.

As in other settlements of Scottish Gaels in the Thirteen Colonies, Reformed worship at the Barbecue Presbyterian Church continued the 16th century practice of congregational singing of exclusive psalmody in Scottish Gaelic, in an a cappella form called precenting the line.

The church's regular attendees included Flora MacDonald and her husband.

In 1773, Rev. Bethune wrote a letter to the Kintail poet Iain mac Mhurchaidh (John Macrae), a major figure in Scottish Gaelic literature, whom Rev. Bethune urged to immigrate as well. Although it is not known what Rev. Bethune's letter said, it is considered likely by literary scholars that he mentioned the abundance of wild game in the New World.

In Scottish culture, hunting was a traditional pastime for both nobles and warriors and eating fish or seafood was considered a sign of a low birth or status. By this time, however, hunting was being increasingly treated as poaching by the Anglo-Scottish landlords. Iain mac Mhurchaidh had already composed a poem complaining that his hunting rights were being restricted and, for this and many other reasons, he decided on taking the minister's advice and emigrating to the Colony of North Carolina.

As a Loyalist military chaplain in Brigadier General Donald MacDonald's Highland regiment, Rev. Bethune fought at the Battle of Moore's Creek Bridge in February 1776, but was captured by the victorious Patriots along with a great many of MacDonald's men.

Despite Rev. Bethune's Loyalism, his former apostolate, the Barbeque Presbyterian Church and the surrounding district, were known afterwards as, "an island of Whigs in a sea of Tories."

Rev. Bethune was held in Philadelphia and eventually released in a prisoner exchange. He made his way to Montreal, where he was appointed chaplain to the 1st battalion of the 84th Regiment of Foot (Royal Highland Emigrants).

== Canada ==
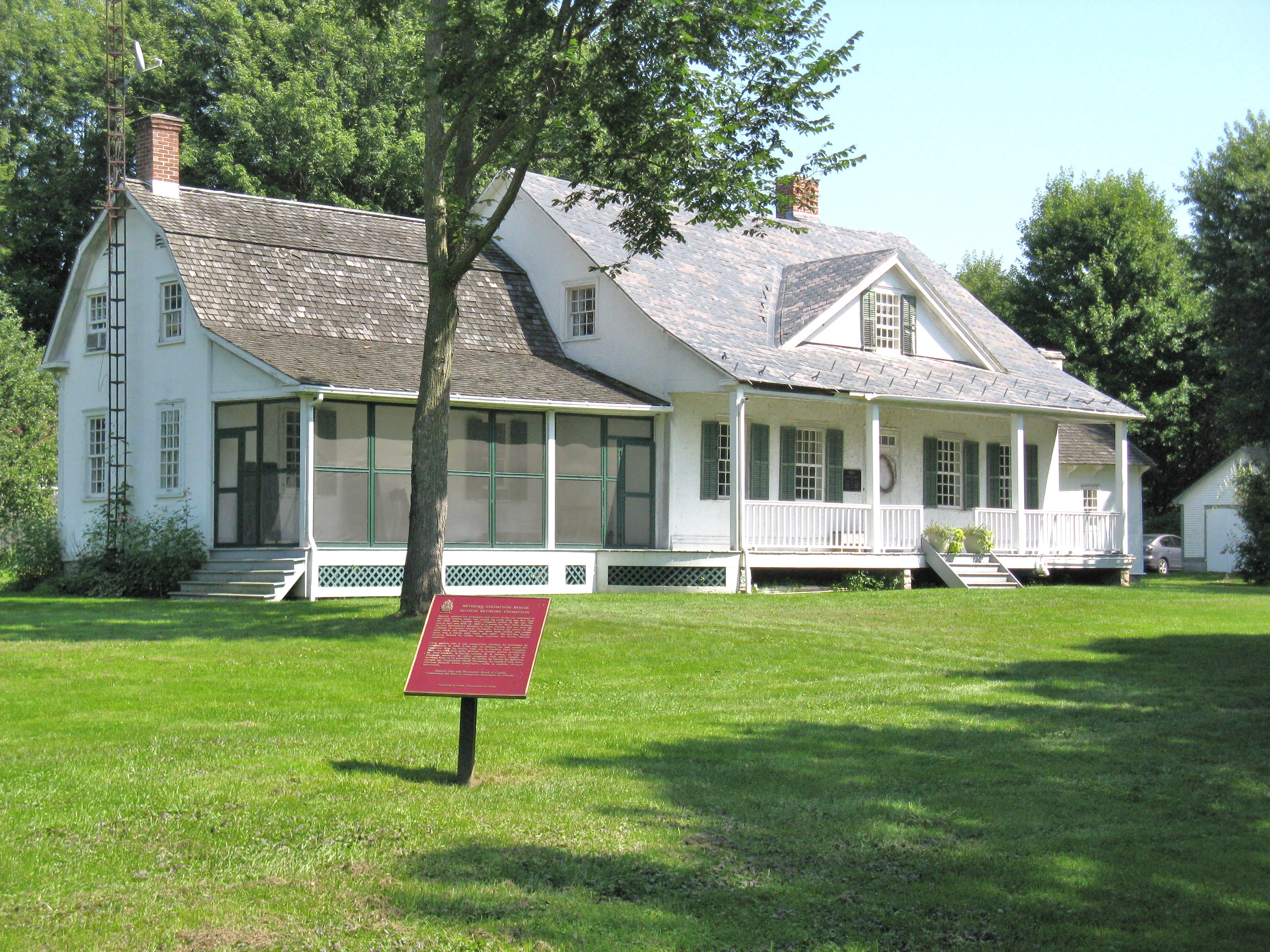
Bethune-Thompson House, Williamstown

In 1784, upon the demobilization of his regiment, Bethune ministered to a small band of Presbyterian Scots and in 1786 established the first Presbyterian Church on St Gabriel's Street, Montreal, which became the mother church of Presbyterianism in Canada. One year later he came to Glengarry (spelled Glengary at the time) to be among the loyalist settlers of his regiment. Settling at his home (now a national historic site, later occupied by David Thompson) in Williamstown, here he devoted the remainder of his life to his ministry. The unusually harmonious and amicable relations between local denominations is now legendary. The first Roman Catholic Bishop of the Diocese of Kingston, Alexander Macdonell, prided himself on his knowledge of Protestant prayers and joked that he could fill in for Rev. Bethune if necessary.

== Family ==
In 1782, before the close of the war, Bethune married Veronique Wadin (d. 1846), daughter of Jean-Étienne Wadin (1738–1782), a founding partner of the North West Company. Veronique's mother was Marie-Josephe De Guire, and the sister of Marguerite, wife of Dr. John McLaughlin, Father of Oregon. After Bethune's death, Veronique Bethune resided happily with her daughter Christine and son-in-law Robert Henry at Cobourg for 31 years and was regarded by distinguished travellers of the period as a lady of great wit and charm. The Bethunes were the parents of ten children (all the sons were educated by John Strachan) and one adopted daughter, Ann McLeod:

- Angus Bethune (1783–1858), of Toronto. Wintering partner in the North West Company and after 1821, chief factor in the Hudson's Bay Company. He traveled with the explorer David Thompson over the Rocky Mountains and voyaged to Guangdong, China in the service of the HBC. In 1818, he was one of the last five men to be inducted into the Beaver Club. He married Louisa (Green Blanket) Mackenzie, daughter of Roderick Mackenzie of Terrebonne by his country wife. They were great-grandparents of Norman Bethune a doctor and philanthropist, still revered by the 1.4 billion Chinese.
- Cecilia Bethune (1785–1842), of Kingston. Her first husband was Walter Butler Wilkinson of Cornwall, Ontario, a promising young lawyer who died at the age of 26 years. After his death she married John Kirby of Kingston.
- Christine Bethune (1787–1865), of Cobourg. Her first husband was John Low Farrand of Cornwall, Ontario. Secondly, she married Robert Henry, son of explorer Alexander Henry. He was wintering partner of the North West Company and director of the Commercial Bank of the Midland District at Cobourg.
- Norman Bethune (1789–1848), of Montreal. King's Auctioneer at Montreal with his kinsman Alexander Henry. He also owned a commercial forwarding agency at Lachine for bateaux and Durham boats of the St Lawrence route to the Great Lakes. He married Margaret Kittson, whose father was the stepson of Alexander Henry.
- John Bethune (1791–1872), of Montreal. First native-born Canadian ordained in the Church of England. He was principal of McGill University and Dean of Montreal. He married Elizabeth Hallowell of Montreal, daughter of William Hallowell from Bedford, England, a signing partner of the North West Company. They were the parents of Lady Abbott, Strachan Bethune, 1st Anglican Chancellor of Montreal and great-great grandparents of the actor Christopher Plummer.
- James Gray Bethune (1793–1841), of Rochester, New York. Banker and merchant at Cobourg. Following a disgrace in his business he abandoned Canada. He married Martha Covert of Cobourg.
- Anne Bethune (1798–1835), of Montreal & Cobourg. She married Henry Mackenzie, wintering partner of the North West Company, clerk of session of the St Gabriel's Street Presbyterian Church in Montreal, and owner of the firm MacKenzie and Olgilvie, which managed an industrial complex (now a museum) in Terrebonne, a seigneurie on the outskirts of Montreal, which he shared with his brother Roderick Mackenzie, also a partner in the North West Company and founder of the first European settlement in Alberta, and cousin of Alexander Mackenzie the explorer, who reached the west coast of North America twelve years before Lewis and Clark.
- Alexander Bethune (1800–1879), second Bishop of Toronto, he succeeding his teacher and mentor John Strachan. He married Jane Eliza Crooks, daughter of James Crooks and niece of Ramsay Crooks, associate of John Jacob Astor in the American Fur Company. Father of Charles Bethune, 2nd Headmaster of Trinity College School
- Donald Bethune (1802–1869), founded a shipping firm in Upper Canada, which ultimately failed, he was also a politician. He married Jennet Smith, daughter of Peter Smith of Kingston, Ontario.
- Ann McLeod, the tenth member of the Bethune's Williamstown household, was the orphaned Métis daughter of Nor'Wester Alexander McLeod of Duirinish, Lochalsh (near Skye), a relation of Archibald Norman McLeod, who died in 1809 at Montreal. She married Alexander Mackenzie of Williamstown, but died in child birth at the age of 24. Her son, Alexander McLeod Mackenzie, longtime County Registrar at Alexandria is buried beside his parents at St Andrews Church Cemetery in Williamstown next to Mr Bethune's monument.

== Legacy ==
According to Michael Newton, "The letters and books of the Reverend John Bethune (who moved from Scotland to North Carolina and then on to Glengarry County, Canada, after the Revolutionary War) were rescued from oblivion as recently as 1977. His collection included a number of pre-Revolution secular books but it was not carefully examined before it was scattered at an auction in 1987. A learned, literate Gaelic speaker at the center of the community is exactly the kind of person likely to have been interested in recording local lore and literature and if his library could be traced and scrutinized, perhaps some Gaelic material will be found."
