= Quebec Bank =

Canadian bank (1818–1918)

- Industry: Banking
- Founded: 9 July 1818
- Defunct: 1917
- Fate: Acquired by the Royal Bank of Canada
- Headquarters: 110, rue Saint-Pierre, Quebec City

The Quebec Bank (French: Banque de Québec, pronounced [bɑ̃k də kebɛk]) was founded on June 9, 1818 to meet a perceived need by some merchants and residents of Quebec City. They wanted an alternative to the newly founded Bank of Montreal which they felt was inadequate for the needs of the province.

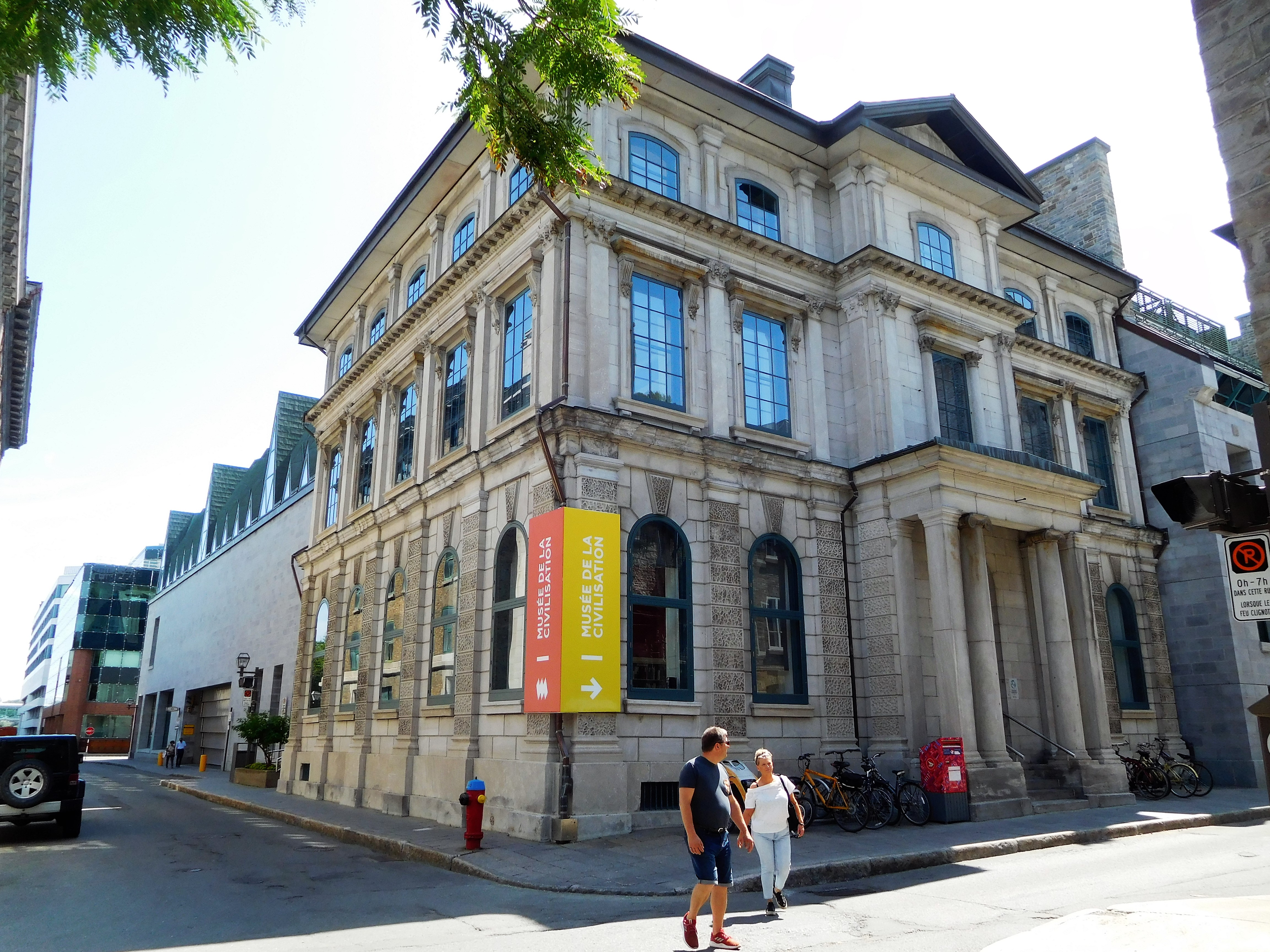
The 1861 head office at 110, rue Saint-Pierre in Quebec, designed by Edward Staveley

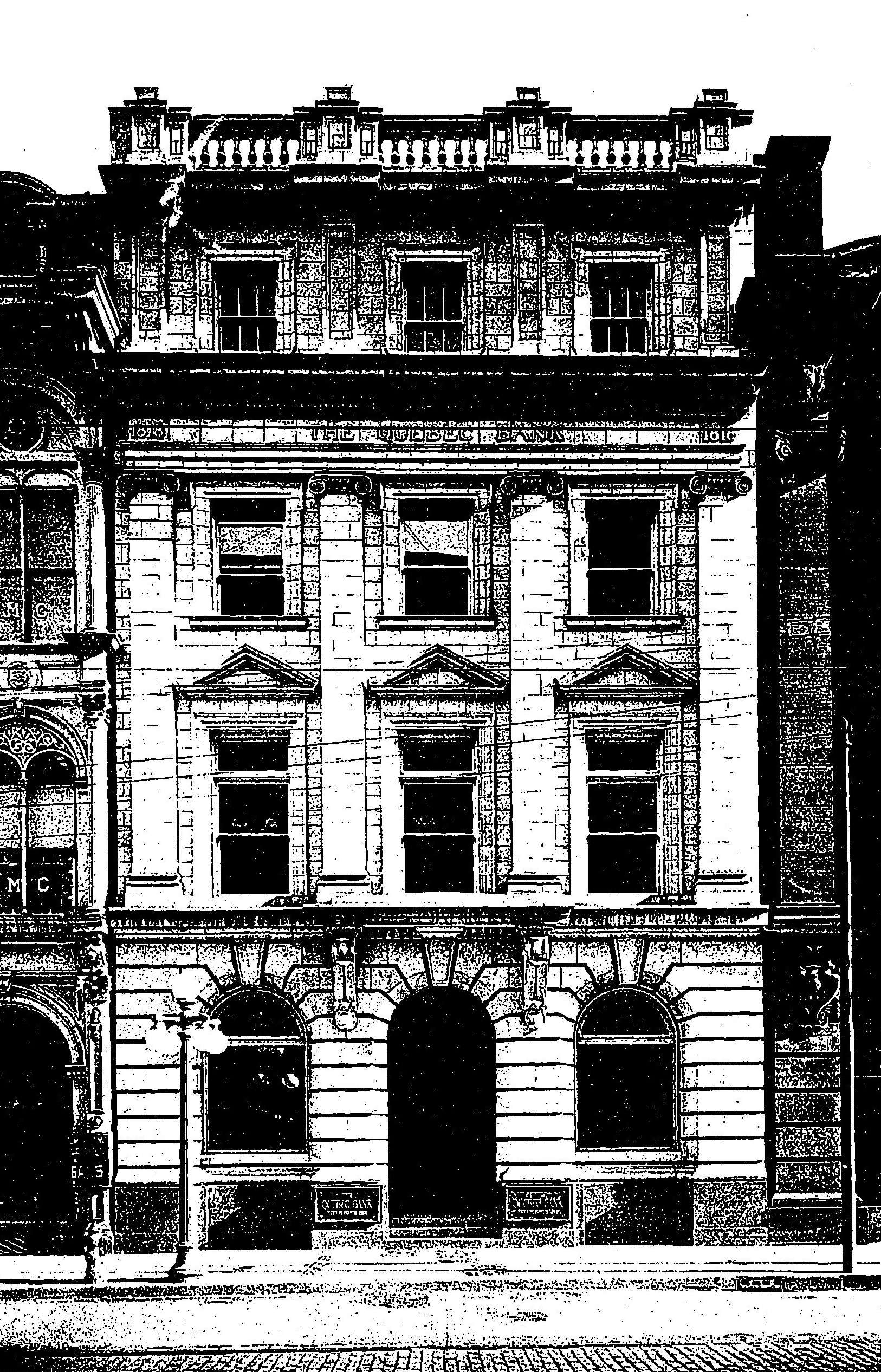
The 1911 Toronto office at 35 King Street West, designed by Curry & Sparling

The bank was incorporated in 1822 in Quebec City and made good progress until the great revulsion of 1826–7. The first president was John William Woolsey. Robert Henry Bethune was part of the banks organization from 1864 -1870 during a time when Quebec Bank was changing the way Canadian banks lent money. The bank was predominantly in Quebec and to a lesser extent in Ontario with a few branches in western Canada when it was absorbed by the Royal Bank of Canada in 1917. The integration of the Quebec Bank into the Royal Bank was made effective January 1, 1918, adding 20 million dollars to the assets of the Royal Bank.

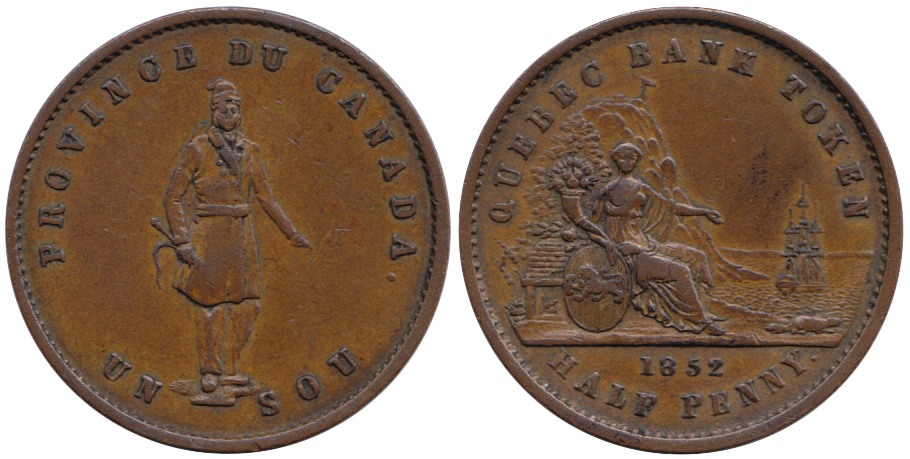
Quebec Bank token, 1852.

A small reminder of the banks existence is the Quebec Bank Building in Montreal with its name carved over the entrance. On July 27, 2018, The Quebec Bank branch in Toronto, located at 50 King Street East, was designated under Part IV of the Ontario Heritage Act as being of cultural heritage value or interest.
