= John William Woolsey =

Canadian businessman

John William Woolsey (26 July 1767 – 9 May 1853) was a Canadian businessman born at Quebec.

Woolsey was the first president of Quebec Bank which was founded in 1818 and incorporated in 1822.
