= Joseph Abbott (Canadian priest) =

Canadian cleric

Joseph Abbott (baptized 10 June 1790 – 10 January 1862) was a Canadian clergyman in the Anglican Church of Canada, and the father of John Joseph Caldwell Abbott, the third Prime Minister of Canada. Joseph Abbott was baptized in Little Strickland, in the United Kingdom. His parents were Joseph Abbott and Isabella Abbott. He is also the great-great-grandfather of Canadian actor Christopher Plummer. He is known for writing two books, Memoranda of a settler in Lower Canada; or, the emigrant to North America and Philip Musgrave; or memoirs of a Church of England missionary in the North American colonies.
