= James Bethune =

James Bethune may refer to:

- James Beaton (or Bethune) (1473–1539), Scottish Roman Catholic bishop and Keeper of the Great Seal of Scotland
- James Bethune (politician) (1840–1884), Canadian politician
- James Gray Bethune (1793–1841), Canadian businessman and judge
- James Lindesay-Bethune, 16th Earl of Lindsay (born 1955), Scottish businessman and politician
- James Neil Bethune (died 1884), American lawyer who held Blind Tom Wiggins in slavery
