= John of Béthune =

John of Béthune or Jean de Béthune may refer to:

- John of Béthune (died 1219), bishop of Cambrai
- John of Béthune (died 1238), jure uxoris count of Saint-Pol

== See also ==
- John Bethune (disambiguation)
