= George Bethune =

George Bethune may refer to:

- George Bethune (gridiron football) (born 1967), former American football player
- George Henry Bethune (1878–1965), farmer and political figure in Ontario
- George Washington Bethune (1805–1862), preacher-pastor in the Dutch Reformed Church
- George Maximilian Bethune (1854–1942), English cricketer
- George Bethune (politician) (c. 1635–?), Scottish politician
