= John Bethune (principal) =

Canadian Anglican cleric

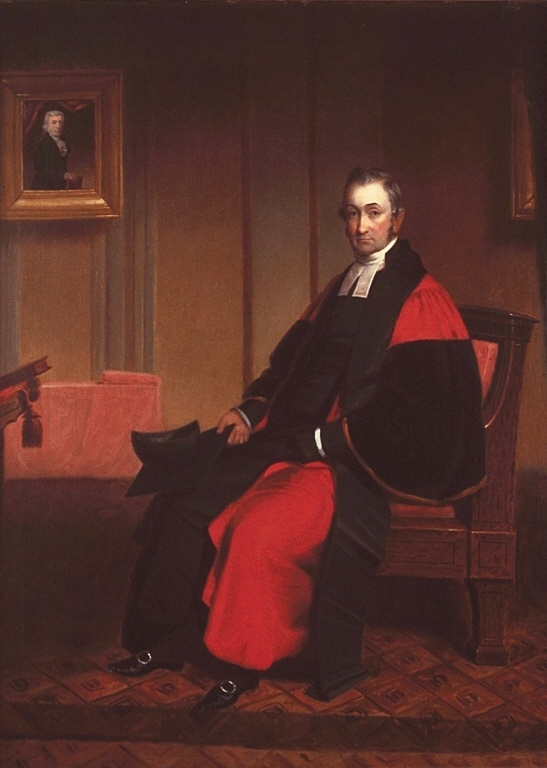
- Born: John Wadden Bethune; 5 January 1791; Charlottenburg (Williamstown), Upper Canada
- Died: 22 August 1872 (aged 81); Montreal, Quebec
- Occupations: Anglican cleric, dean of the Diocese of Montreal
- Spouse: Elizabeth Hallowell
- Children: Strachan Bethune; Mary Bethune
- Parent(s): John Bethune; Véronique Waddin

John Wadden Bethune (5 January 1791 – 22 August 1872) was a Canadian Anglican cleric and the acting principal of McGill University from 1835 to 1846.

== Life and work ==
Born in Williamstown, Glengarry County, Upper Canada, he was the son of the Reverend John Bethune and Véronique Waddin who was the daughter of Jean-Étienne Waddens (1738–1782), a founding partner in the North West Company and formerly a professor at the University of Bern and the University of Geneva, Switzerland.

Bethune received his education at the school of the Reverend John Strachan in Cornwall, Ontario. After serving in the War of 1812, he entered the ministry of the Church of England and in 1814, he was ordained by Bishop Jacob Mountain in Quebec City. In 1818 he was made rector of Christ Church, Montreal, where he remained for more than 50 years, eventually becoming dean of the diocese. He succeeded George Mountain as principal of McGill University from November 1835 until May 1846, afterwards replaced by Edmund Allen Meredith. He died in 1872.

Bethune was part of a prominent family which included four brothers of note: Alexander Neil Bethune became Bishop of the Diocese of Toronto; James Gray Bethune was a businessman; Angus Bethune was prominent in the fur trade and Donald Bethune was an important political figure in Upper Canada.

Bethune married Elizabeth Hallowell, daughter of William Hallowell (1771–1838), partner of the North West Company, and his wife Martha, daughter of Alexander Henry the elder. They were the parents of Strachan Bethune and Mary Martha Bethune, who married Canadian prime minister Sir John Abbott. Bethune was the great-great-grandfather of Canadian actor Christopher Plummer, and the great-great-great-grandfather of actress Amanda Plummer.

He was made a Doctor of Divinity (D.D.) by Columbia University, and a Doctor of Laws (LLD) by McGill University.
