= Hugh Richardson (shipowner) =

Canadian shipowner and captain

Hugh Richardson (June 12, 1784 – August 2, 1870) was a Canadian shipowner and captain.

Richardson was born in England and went to sea at a young age. He and his wife came to Canada in 1821.

Soon after his arrival in Canada, Hugh became part of the militia at York (Toronto), and by 1825 was also beginning his involvement in the shipping business by having the steamer Canada constructed for the York–Hamilton–Niagara run. It began operation the next year. In the next years his business grew and he also became involved in the improvement of Toronto harbour.

By the early 1840s, Richardson's business had expanded further. However, there was hard competition from American interests and a Canadian competitor, Donald Bethune. By 1846, he declared bankruptcy.

His assets were sold and he worked in the industry as a captain. Then, in 1850, he became the first harbourmaster of Toronto. With this appointment, he gained a good salary and important social position. Hugh remained in the position until his death.
