= Henry Bethune =

Henry Bethune may refer to:

- Norman Bethune (Henry Norman Bethune, 1890–1939), Canadian physician, medical innovator and Anti-fascist
- Henry Bethune (cricketer) (1844–1912), English cricketer
- Henry Lindsay Bethune (1787–1851), English officer
