= Edith Hallett Bethune =

Canadian photographer (1890–1970)

- Born: 1890; D'Escousse, Nova Scotia, Canada
- Died: 1970 (aged 79–80); Berwick, Nova Scotia, Canada
- Known for: Photography
- Movement: Pictorialism

Edith Hallett Bethune (1890–1970) was a Canadian amateur photographer known for her pictorialist photography.

Edith Hallett Bethune, "John E. (Jackie) Bethune and Terrier," c. 1937

== Biography ==
Bethune was born 3 November 1890 in D'Escousse, Nova Scotia.

Bethune's interest in photography began with her taking casual snapshots around Berwick, Nova Scotia where her husband was working as a physician. She became involved with the Annapolis Valley Pictorialists and began manually coloring her photographs. She exhibited her photographs at the Canadian Salon of Photography. Her photographs appeared in Maclean's magazine (identified as Mrs. R.O. Bethune), The Camera magazine, American Photography magazine, the American Annual of Photography, and Photo-Era magazine. She won the Kodak Competition twice, in 1929 and 1931.

In 1933, Bethune won the Diploma for Exceptional Photographic Art at the Century of Progress exhibition in Chicago.

Bethune was disabled by a stroke in 1947. She died in Berwick in 1970.
