= Robert Henry Bethune =

Canadian banker (1836–1895)

Robert Henry Bethune (May 5, 1836 – March 27, 1895) was a Canadian banker born in Cobourg, Upper Canada. He was the son of Alexander Neil Bethune and Jane Eliza Crooks (1809–1861).

Robert was raised in Cobourg, educated in private schools, and then attended Upper Canada College in Toronto. He began his banking career in Brockville with the Bank of Montreal. His employers were impressed and increased his responsibilities. By 1864, he was the manager in St. Catharines and married. He also changed employers and moved to the Quebec Bank, where they were pioneering new approaches to lending.

In 1870, Bethune worked as a cashier at the Dominion Bank in Toronto. He began a period of quiet expansion and growth. He was the general manager there for 24 years and oversaw successful development that spanned three economic downturns.
