= Rupe Bethune =

Australian rules footballer, born 1917

Personal information
- Full name: Rupert Charles Bethune
- Born: 15 August 1917; Dalyston, Victoria
- Died: 2 March 1984 (aged 66); Mulgrave, Victoria
- Original team: Kilcunda / Dalyston
- Height: 187 cm (6 ft 2 in)
- Weight: 81 kg (179 lb)

Playing career^{1}
| Years | Club | Games (Goals) |
| 1939–41 | Geelong | 29 (3) |
- ^{1} Playing statistics correct to the end of 1941.

Rupert Charles Bethune (15 August 1917 – 2 March 1984) was an Australian rules footballer who played with Geelong in the Victorian Football League (VFL).
