= Phyllis Bethune =

New Zealand artist

- Born: Phyllis Dagmar Drummond Sharpe; 27 February 1899; Woodbury, New Zealand
- Died: 12 December 1982 (aged 84); Wānaka, New Zealand
- Education: Ilam School of Fine Arts
- Known for: Painting

Phyllis Dagmar Drummond Bethune (née Sharpe; 27 February 1899 – 12 December 1982) was a New Zealand artist.

Work by Bethune is held in the collection of the Dunedin Public Art Gallery and she helped form several New Zealand art societies.

== Education ==
Bethune was educated at the Canterbury College School of Art (now Ilam School of Fine Arts) under Cecil Kelly, Richard Wallwork, and A. F. Nicholl. Her contemporaries included Ngaio Marsh, James Cook, Evelyn Page, and Olivia Spencer Bower.

== Career ==
Bethune was a landscape painter, primarily based in the South Canterbury region of New Zealand.

Bethune was involved in New Zealand art societies including as a committee member of the South Canterbury Art Society, the formation of an art society in Waimate, and founding the Wānaka Art Group.

=== Exhibitions ===
Bethune exhibited with:

- Auckland Society of Arts between 1949 and 1956
- Canterbury Society of Arts (under the name Bethune and Sharpe) in 1959
- South Canterbury Art Society between 1953 and 1964
- New Zealand Academy of Fine Arts (under the name Bethune and Sharpe)
- Otago Art Society (under the name Sharpe)
- Aigantighe Art Gallery in 1972

From 1936 to 1947 she was a member of The Group and exhibited with them in 1935 (under the name Sharpe); 1936; 1938; 1940; 1943; 1947.

== Personal life ==
She married John Bethune in October 1935 in Woodbury, Canterbury, New Zealand. She moved to Wānaka later in life, and died there in 1982.
