= George Washington Bethune =

Dutch-American preacher-pastor

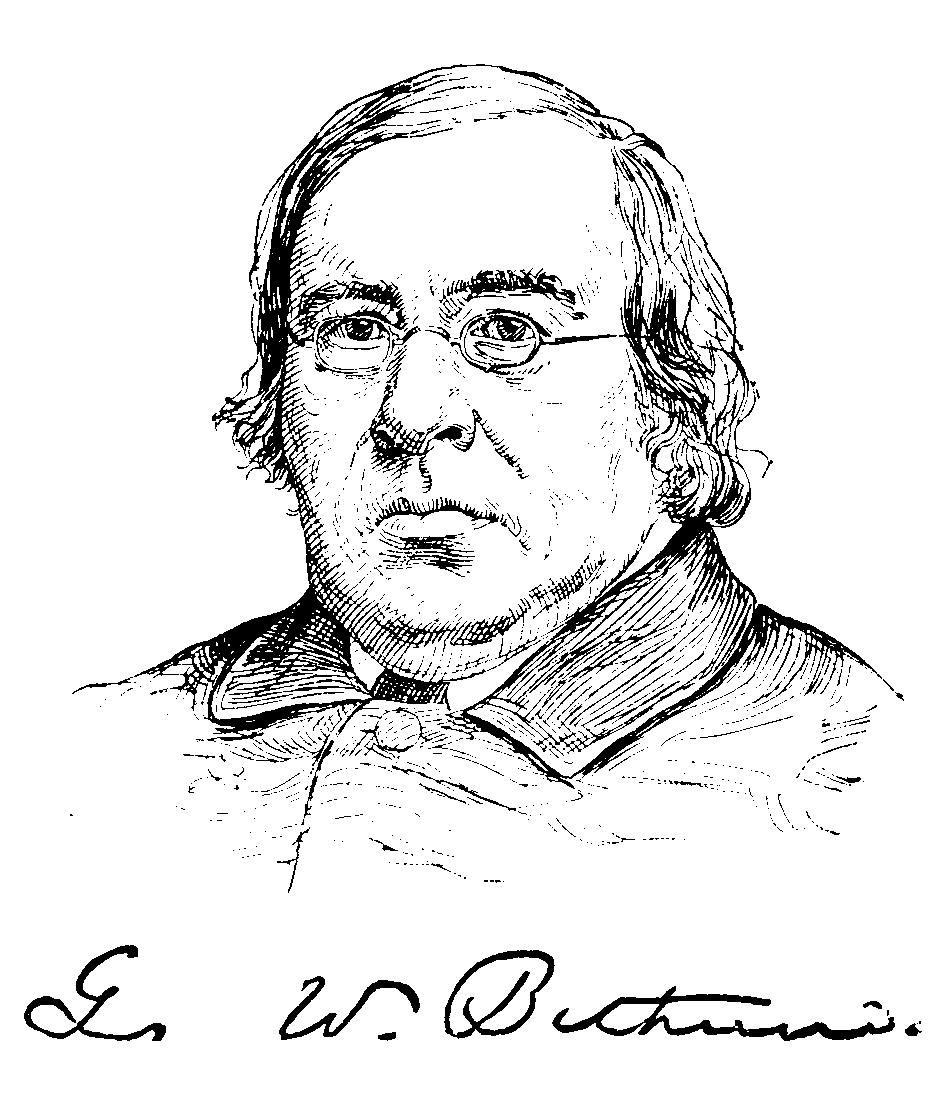
George Washington Bethune

George Washington Bethune (March 18, 1805 – April 28, 1862) was a preacher-pastor in the Dutch Reformed Church in the United States.

== Life and career ==
Of Huguenot descent, his father was Divie Bethune, a highly successful merchant in New York. Originally a student at Columbia College of Columbia University, where he was a member of the Philolexian Society, Bethune graduated in 1822 from Dickinson College, Carlisle, Pennsylvania and went on to study theology at Princeton University. He married Mary Williams in November, 1825.

In 1827, he was appointed Pastor of the Reformed Dutch Church, Rhinebeck, New York. In 1830, he moved to Utica, New York; in 1834 to Philadelphia; and in 1850 to Brooklyn Heights, NY. He was offered the chaplaincy of the U.S. Military Academy, the Chancellorship of New York University and the Provostship of University of Pennsylvania, all of which he declined.

In 1839, Bethune was elected as a member to the American Philosophical Society.

He was an outspoken Democrat in politics, opposed to slavery but unsympathetic to abolitionism.

Due to his Calvinist ideas about the unsuitability of such a hobby for a clergyman, Bethune, an avid fisherman, worked anonymously on five of the US editions of Izaak Walton's The Compleat Angler under the pseudonym The American Editor. Tradition has it that his personal library included 2000 works on angling.

He also wrote many hymns, some of which are still used today. One popular hymn he wrote is "There is no Name so Sweet on Earth." The hymn "When Time Seems Short and Death is Near" was found in his portfolio and was written on April 27, 1862, the day before his death.

While visiting Florence, Italy for his health, he fell ill after preaching and died of a stroke on April 27, 1862. His Life and Letters were edited by A. R. Van Nest, 1867.

== Published works ==
- The Fruit of the Spirit (1839)
- Sermons (1847)
- Lays of Love and Faith (1847)
- The Complete Angler (Isaac Walton), first American edition (1847)
- The British Female Poets (1848)
- Orations and Discourses (1850)
- Expository Lectures on the Heidelberg Catechism (1864) 2 vols.
