= Sir Alexander Bethune, 10th Baronet =

Sir Alexander Maitland Sharp Bethune 10th Baronet
- Born: 28 March 1909; Tadworth, Surrey, England
- Died: 20 May 1997 (aged 88); Kensington, London, England
- Military career
- Allegiance: United Kingdom
- Branch: British Army
- Service years: 1943–1946
- Rank: Captain
- Unit: Intelligence Corps

Sir Alexander Maitland Sharp Bethune, tenth baronet, was the last of the Bethune Baronets, a title dating from 1683.

== Early life ==
Born in 1909, he was the only son of the ninth baronet Sir Alexander Sharp Bethune and his wife Elizabeth Carnegie Maitland-Heriot. His father had successfully claimed the baronetcy, dormant since the death of Sir William Sharp, 6th Baronet in 1780. After schooling at West Downs School, Sunningdale School and Eton College he earned a BA in Modern Languages and History at Magdalene College, Cambridge. His sister Evelyn was the mother of Sir Alastair Pilkington, developer of float glass.

== Career ==
Following an initial job with Quaker Oats in the USA which came to an end when foreign workers were deported in 1934, he joined the Lord &Thomas advertising agency in London. On the outbreak of World War II, he was recruited for the Foreign Office, serving in Jugoslavia and the Soviet Union. Switching to the British Army in 1943, he became an officer in the Intelligence Corps. After the war, he started his own business in specialist photocopying.

== Family ==
In 1955 he married Ruth Mary Hayes and they had one daughter Lucy, a dancer. He died in 1997.

== Bibliography ==
- Fife Sharps and Bethunes: An Essay in Family History. Alexander Sharp Bethune (10th Baronet). Lucy Bethune, 1997 - Genealogy - 499 pages.

Baronetage of Nova Scotia
Preceded by Alexander Sharp Bethune	Baronet (of Scotscraig); 1917–1997	Extinct
