= Margaret Bethune =

Scottish midwife (1820–1887)

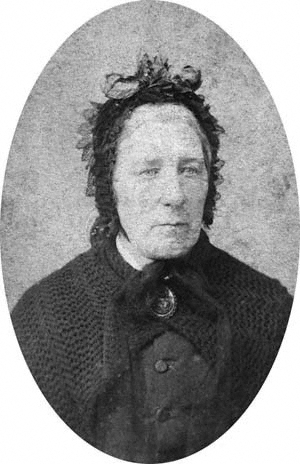
- Born: 2 October 1820; Peebles, Scotland
- Died: 20 April 1887 (aged 66); Largo, Fife, Scotland
- Occupation: Midwife

Margaret Bethune (2 October 1820 – 20 April 1887), born Margaret Peebles, was a Scottish midwife who kept a detailed register of almost 1300 births she attended in Largo parish in Fife. Her register survives as a rich record for the history of midwifery in Scotland.

== Early life ==
Bethune was born in Peebles, the daughter of Margaret Walker, a linen worker, and Andrew Peebles, a weaver of Lundin Mill.

== Career ==
In order to provide for her young children and elderly mother, the widowed Bethune moved from Largo to Edinburgh in 1852, to seek midwifery training. She purchased a copy of Alexander Hamilton's Concise Rules for the Conduct of Midwives in the Exercise of their Profession, published in 1793, and gained a ticket to work on the wards at a maternity hospital in Edinburgh.

Bethune returned to her family in 1853, and began working as a midwife or "howdie" in her community. Bethune kept a casebook, recording 1,296 labours she attended, all within the parish of Largo, with only two maternal deaths registered. She was a respected and able midwife, and she attended to the vast majority of births in her parish for several decades.

== Personal life and legacy ==
In 1844, she married William Bethune, a coal miner. They had two children, Margaret (born 1845) and William (born 1847). She was widowed at age 32, when her husband died in a mining accident. Margaret Bethune died from heart disease in Largo in 1887, aged 66 years. Her casebook is preserved in the National Records of Scotland. Bethune's register was featured in a 2015 exhibit in Edinburgh, marking the centenary of the Midwives Act 1915.
