= John Bethune (Scottish minister) =

Church of Scotland minister and philosopher

John Bethune FRS (1725–1774) was an 18th-century Scottish minister remembered as a philosopher.

== Life ==
Bethune was born in Croy on 6 September 1725, the son of Margaret Rose and Farquhar Bethune. His uncle was Rev Daniel Bethune, also known as Am Beutanach Beag (1679–1754).

From 1738 to 1742, he studied at Marischal College, Aberdeen going on to study divinity first at the University of St Andrews and then at the University of Edinburgh. As was then normal for ministers, whilst awaiting a post, he was private tutor to the children of the Carruthers of Holmains in Dumfriesshire. He was licensed to preach by the Presbytery of the Church of Scotland in Lochmaben in March 1750 and was ordained at Rosskeen in October 1754.

In February 1773, he was elected a Fellow of the Royal Society of London (the Royal Society of Edinburgh did not exist at that time). His election was on the basis of his philosophical writings.

He died in the manse at Rosskeen on the night of 14/15 April 1774.

== Family ==
In December 1755, he married his cousin, Janet Bethune, daughter of Rev Daniel Bethune. They had three daughters, all of whom died young.

== Publications ==
see

- A Short View of the Human Faculties and Passions (1766)
- Essays and Dissertations on Various Subjects Relating to Human Life and Happiness 2 vols. (1771)
