= Alexander Bethune (bishop) =

Church of England clergyman and bishop and the son of John Bethune

Alexander Neil Bethune (August 28, 1800 – February 3, 1879) was a Church of England clergyman and bishop.

== Early and Family Life ==
The son of the Reverend John Bethune of Williamstown, Ontario, the founding Church of Scotland minister for Upper Canada, Alexander Neil Bethune married Jane Eliza Crooks (1809–1861), the daughter of the Hon. James Crooks (1778–1860) and Jane Cummings (1791–1861). Alexander and Eliza had ten children. They included Robert Henry Bethune, a noted banker with the Dominion Bank. He brother John, also a clergyman, was acting principal of McGill University from 1835 to 1846. Other notable brothers included businessman James Gray, fur trader Angus and politician Donald. The family was part of the Family Compact, the political clique which ran Upper Canada for decades.

== Career ==
Alexander Neil Bethune was ordained in 1824 and took charge of the parish at Grimsby, Ontario. In 1867, after a long and successful career, he was consecrated as bishop of the Diocese of Toronto by the Right Reverend John Strachan.

Bishop Bethune inherited a diocese quite fragmented from methods and policies attributed to Strachan and/or the Family Compact. These circumstances made his episcopate appear less successful. He was a humble man and some saw this as a weakness causing his message to be lost his generation.

== Death and legacy ==
Bethune died in Toronto in 1879, shortly before the North-West Rebellion, and was succeeded as bishop by Arthur Sweatman. One of his sons, Alexander Bethune, continued the clergy family tradition, serving at Trinity Church.
