= Donald Bethune =

Canadian politician

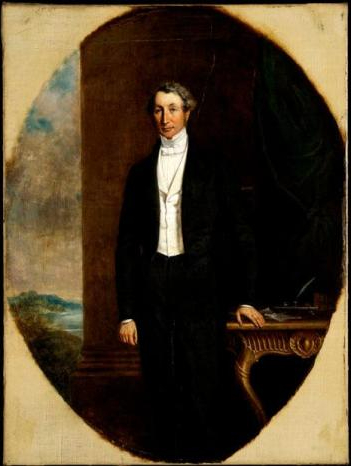
by George Theodore Berthon, 1845

Donald Bethune (July 11, 1802 – June 19, 1869) was a lawyer, judge, entrepreneur and political figure in Upper Canada.

He was born in Williamstown in Upper Canada in 1802, the son of Reverend John Bethune. Donald was part of a prominent family which included four brothers of note: Alexander Neil, became bishop of the diocese of Toronto, James Gray Bethune was a businessman, Angus Bethune was prominent in the fur trade and John Bethune was an Anglican clergyman and acting principal of McGill University.

He studied with his brother John, in Augusta Township and with John Strachan in Cornwall. He articled in law with Jonas Jones and was called to the bar in 1823. He served as judge in the Bathurst and Prince Edward District courts. He was elected to the Legislative Assembly of Upper Canada for the town of Kingston in 1828; he was defeated in 1830.

In 1833, he became involved in shipping goods on Lake Ontario, buying a steamboat. In 1840, he was awarded the contract for delivering mail and expanded his fleet of steamboats. He was originally based in Cobourg, but moved to Toronto in 1843. After fierce competition with Hugh Richardson to control the shipping business in the region, Bethune's business failed in 1848 and again in 1851, after the banks allowed him to lease back his boats. Bethune left for England in 1853; after his return in 1858, he returned to the practice of law at Port Hope.

He died in Toronto in 1869.
