= Mary Bethune Abbott =

Canadian politician

Mary Abbott
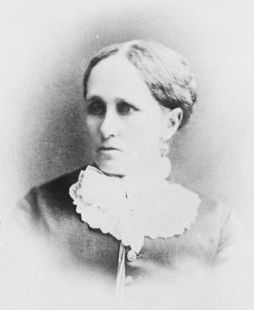
- Undated photo of Abbott
- Born: Mary Martha Bethune; October 17, 1823
- Died: February 25, 1898 (aged 74); Montreal, Quebec, Canada
- Known for: Spouse of the Prime Minister of Canada
- Spouse: John Abbott (m. 1849; died 1893)
- Children: 8
- Parents: John Bethune; Elizabeth Hallowell

Mary Martha Bethune, Lady Abbott (October 17, 1823 – February 25, 1898) was the wife of Sir John Abbott, the third Prime Minister of Canada.

== Family ==
Bethune was the daughter of Anglican clergyman and McGill acting president John Bethune. She and John Abbott married on July 26, 1849 and had four sons and four daughters. Mary and John Abbott are maternal great-grandparents of actor Christopher Plummer.

== See also ==
- Spouse of the prime minister of Canada
