= Sir William Sharp, 6th Baronet =

Scottish soldier of fortune (1729–1780)

Sir William Sharp 6th Baronet of Scotscraig
- Born: 28 January 1729; St Andrews, Fife, Scotland
- Died: 13 February 1780 (aged 51) St Marylebone, Middlesex, England
- Buried: St Marylebone
- Allegiance: Jacobitism; France; Portugal
- Branch: Jacobite Army; French Army; Portuguese Army
- Service years: 1745-1746 Jacobites; 1747-1761 France; 1762-1780 Portugal
- Rank: 1746 Life Guard (Jacobites); 1761 Captain (France); 1775 Major-General (Portugal)
- Conflicts: Jacobite rising of 1745; War of the Austrian Succession; Seven Years' War
- Alma mater: University of St Andrews

Major-General Sir William Sharp, 6th Baronet of Scotscraig, (1729-1780) was a Scottish soldier of fortune, who had a varied and ultimately successful military career but an unhappy private life.

== Life ==
Born on 28 January 1729 in St Andrews, he was the only surviving son of Sir Alexander Sharp, 5th Baronet, (1697-1769) and his wife Margaret Hamilton (1697-1783).

While he was studying at the University of St Andrews, the 1745 Rebellion broke out and he joined the rebel forces. Captured by the British Army, he was condemned to death. After five professors at the university wrote to the court on his behalf, he was reprieved and interned. However he escaped in August 1747 and made his way to France, then fighting Great Britain in the War of the Austrian Succession.

Accepted in the French Army as an officer trainee, by 1761 he was a captain. In that year he resigned his commission and, although an unpardoned rebel, returned to Britain. The British at that time were putting together a group of experienced officers to strengthen the Portuguese forces fighting Spain in the Seven Years' War, and William managed to join them. Created a Major in the Portuguese Army in 1762, in 1763 he was made Colonel of the 1st Infantry Regiment, in 1764 he was Governor of the frontier town of Olivença, and in 1765 a Brigadier.

In 1769 he at last received a pardon from the British government, exonerating him from his rebellion at the age of 16, and also got news of his father's death back in Scotland. Obtaining eight months' leave, he went home to St Andrews to see his widowed mother. There he met Margaret Bethune (about 1729–1791), aged around 40 and unmarried, the eldest surviving daughter and eventual heiress of John Bethune, 5th Laird of Blebo, (1699-1779) and his first wife Janet Scrimgeour (about 1705–1738). After his return to Portugal, Margaret produced a son, baptised privately on 20 August 1771 as Alexander Sharp. No evidence for a marriage has ever been found.

The father gained promotion to Major-General in 1775 but a scandal erupted in 1777. The parents of a girl eight months pregnant forced him to go through a Catholic marriage with her in Olivença, despite him being a Scottish Episcopalian. She was Ana Francisca da Gama Lobo, daughter of Lieutenant-Colonel Francisco Xavier da Silva Lobo. William was not expected to live with her or to take responsibility for their child, a little girl called Domingas who only lived three years. He clearly did not mention having a wife and child in Scotland, neither of whom, at any rate, he never saw again. Given leave for ill health in 1779, he went to London where he died alone in a lodging house on 13 February 1780, leaving nothing but debts. His Portuguese widow remarried.

Margaret in Scotland, who had learned about her Portuguese successor, went back to using her maiden name of Bethune, which was also used for the rest of his life by her son Alexander, who never claimed his father's baronetcy. She married a lawyer and local landowner, Wiliam Chalmers of Radernie (1744-1807), but died in 1791. He had been left Margaret's Blebo estates for life (they then to go to her son Alexander Sharp), and changed his own name to William Bethune subsequently marrying Isobel Morison, who gave him a daughter Isabella in 1795. The three were painted by Wilkie.

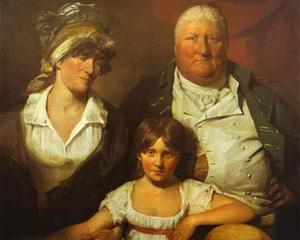
William Bethune with wife & child, about 1804

Baronetage of Nova Scotia
Preceded by Alexander Sharp	Baronet; 1769–1780	Dormant
