= Angus Bethune (fur trader) =

Canadian fur trader (1783–1858)

Angus Bethune (9 September 1783 – 13 November 1858) was the oldest son of the Reverend John Bethune. He had several distinguished brothers: Alexander Neil, who became Anglican bishop of Toronto; John, Anglican clergyman, dean of the diocese of Montreal and principal of McGill University; James Gray prominent Upper Canada businessman; Donald, an important political figure in Upper Canada.

At the time of his birth his father was stationed with the 1st battalion of the Royal Highland Emigrants on Carleton Island, New York, where Lake Ontario empties into the St. Lawrence River. Later, after the Treaty of Paris was signed ending the American Revolutionary War the family briefly resided at Fort Oswegatchie (Ogdensburg, N.Y.) before moving to Montreal when Angus was still a very young child. By 1787 his father had moved once again to Glengarry County in what later became Upper Canada.

Angus joined the North West Company at an early age. In 1804 he was posted to Whitemud River at the southern tip of Lake Manitoba.

By 1810, he was working with Alexander Henry the younger and they travelled to Rocky Mountain House (Alta). There he met David Thompson and assisted Thompson with preparations for his trek through the Rocky Mountains. Thompson was attempting to reach the mouth of the Columbia River and establish the North West Company there ahead of their rival, the Pacific Fur Company. Bethune was to be the NWC person in charge of learning the "China" trade.

In the fall of 1813, he witnessed the NWC's purchase of Fort Astoria from the PFC. By 1814 he was a partner in the company and was travelling to China. Bethune also became an important figure with the Hudson's Bay Company after the amalgamation. He served as a chief factor in a number of locations. After retirement, he became a director of the Bank of Upper Canada.

Angus was part of a prominent family which included four brothers of note. Alexander Neil, became bishop of the diocese of Toronto, James Gray was a businessman, Donald was an important political figure in Upper Canada and John was an Anglican clergyman and acting principal of McGill University. He had six children by his marriage to Louisa, daughter of The Hon. Roderick Mackenzie of Terrebonne, one of whom, Norman, went on to have a medical career worthy of note. One of his great - grand sons was the famous Dr. Norman Bethune that went to China in the 1930s.

Bethune died in Toronto in 1858.

== See also ==
- Duncan McDougall (fur trader)
