= John Abbott =

Prime Minister of Canada from 1891 to 1892

The Honourable Sir John Abbott PC KCMG QC
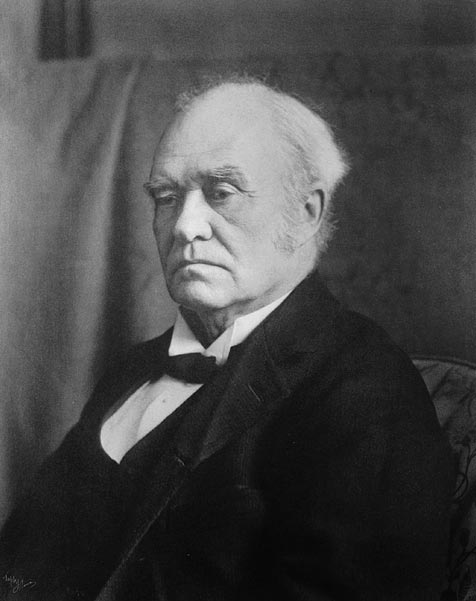
- Abbott in 1892

3rd Prime Minister of Canada
- In office June 16, 1891 – November 24, 1892
- Monarch: Victoria
- Governor General: Lord Stanley of Preston
- Preceded by: John A. Macdonald
- Succeeded by: John Thompson

Leader of the Government in the Senate
- In office May 12, 1887 – October 30, 1893
- Prime Minister: John A. Macdonald; Himself; John Thompson
- Preceded by: Alexander Campbell
- Succeeded by: Mackenzie Bowell

Senator from Quebec (Inkerman)
- In office May 12, 1887 – October 30, 1893
- Nominated by: John A. Macdonald
- Appointed by: Marquess of Lansdowne

19th Mayor of Montreal
- In office 1887–1889
- Preceded by: Honoré Beaugrand
- Succeeded by: Jacques Grenier

Member of Parliament for Argenteuil
- In office August 17, 1881 – February 21, 1887
- Preceded by: Himself
- Succeeded by: James Crocket Wilson
- In office February 12, 1880 – July 13, 1881
- Preceded by: Thomas Christie
- Succeeded by: Himself
- In office September 20, 1867 – October 6, 1874
- Preceded by: Riding established
- Succeeded by: Lemuel Cushing, Jr.

Personal details
- Born: John Joseph Caldwell Abbott; March 12, 1821 St. Andrews East, Lower Canada
- Died: October 30, 1893 (aged 72) Montreal, Quebec, Canada
- Resting place: Mount Royal Cemetery, Montreal
- Party: Conservative
- Spouse: Mary Bethune (m. 1849)
- Children: 8
- Parent(s): Joseph Abbott; Harriet Bradford
- Education: McGill University (1847)

Military service
- Allegiance: Province of Canada; Dominion of Canada
- Branch/service: Canadian Militia
- Years of service: 1847–1884
- Rank: Captain; Lieutenant-Colonel
- Unit: 2nd Montreal Militia Battalion; 4th Montreal Militia Battalion; 11th Argenteuil Rangers
- Commands: 11th Argenteuil Rangers (1862-1884)
- Battles/wars: Fenian Raids

Sir John Joseph Caldwell Abbott (March 12, 1821 – October 30, 1893) was the third prime minister of Canada, serving from 1891 to 1892. He held office as the leader of the Conservative Party.

Abbott was born in what is now Saint-André-d'Argenteuil, Quebec. He studied law at McGill University and became one of Montreal's best-known lawyers, later returning to McGill as a professor of law and earning a Doctor of Civil Law degree. He was perhaps best known for his successful defence of the perpetrators of the St. Albans Raid. Abbott involved himself in politics from a young age, signing the Montreal Annexation Manifesto in 1849 – which he later regretted – and winning election to the Legislative Assembly of the Province of Canada in 1860. In the lead-up to Confederation he was a prominent advocate for the rights of English-speaking Quebecers.

In the 1867 federal election, Abbott was elected to the new House of Commons of Canada as a member of the Conservative Party. A telegram leaked from his office played a key part in the Pacific Scandal of 1873, which led to the downfall of John A. Macdonald's first government. Abbott was appointed to the Senate in 1887, in order to become leader of the Government in the Senate. He became prime minister in June 1891 following Macdonald's death in office. He was the first native-born Canadian prime minister, both Macdonald and Alexander Mackenzie having been born in Scotland, and the first to serve as Prime Minister while sitting in the Senate rather than the House of Commons. Abbott was 70 years old at the time, and served only until November 1892 when he retired due to ill health. He died the following year.

== Early life ==
Abbott was born in St. Andrews, Lower Canada (now Saint-André-d'Argenteuil, Quebec), to Harriet (née Bradford) and the Rev. Joseph Abbott, an Anglican missionary from Little Strickland, England. In 1849, Abbott married Mary Martha Bethune (1823–1898), a relative of Dr. Norman Bethune, a daughter of Anglican clergyman and McGill acting president John Bethune, and a granddaughter of the Presbyterian minister John Bethune. The couple had four sons and four daughters, many of whom died without descendants. Their eldest surviving son, William Abbott, married the daughter of Colonel John Hamilton Gray, a Father of Confederation and premier of Prince Edward Island. Abbott was also the great-grandfather of Canadian actor Christopher Plummer and the first cousin (once removed) of Maude Abbott, one of Canada's earliest female medical graduates and an expert on congenital heart disease.

Abbott was an Orangeman and Freemason.

=== Military service ===
Abbott had served in the local militia “since boyhood”, being appointed an Ensign in the 2nd Montreal Militia Battalion in 1847. In 1849 he was a signatory to the Montreal Annexation Manifesto, calling for union of the Canadas with the United States, resulting in the withdrawal of his commission in the militia. By 1850 however, he was reinstated and appointed a Captain in the 4th Montreal Militia Battalion.

His recruitment of a battalion of 300 men, known as the 11th Argenteuil Rangers, during the Trent Affair of 1861 may have been designed to atone for what he later described as the “sins of youth” and to enhance his political credentials, as much as to express his concern for his country's safety. On March 14, 1862, he was appointed Major in the 11th (Argenteuil Rifles) Volunteer Militia, being promoted to Lieutenant-Colonel on March 21.

He commanded the regiment on the border multiple times throughout the Fenian Raids, on March 8, 1866, they were called out for active service and were stationed in various villages throughout Argenteuil. On June 11, 1866, the Rangers were called out to serve at Cornwall, and then Saint-Jean-sur-Richelieu, and a reporter from Montreal stated:

"I learned on Sunday afternoon that troops were to be sent to St. Johns [Saint-Jean] by special train; and managed to procure permission to come out with them. The troops sent forward were a part of the force recently garrisoning Cornwall, a portion of the 25th Regt. under Col. Fan, and the Argenteuil Rangers under Lieut. Col. The Hon. J.J.C. Abbott."

Abbott retired from the militia as a Lieutenant Colonel, commanding the 11th Battalion, on June 22, 1883.

Taunted by his political opponents in March 1889 for his “disloyalty” in 1849, he explained that he considered his military service, and his commission as an officer and later commanding officer of the 11th Argenteuil Battalion of militia, to be evidence that his youthful error had been forgiven.

== Legal career ==
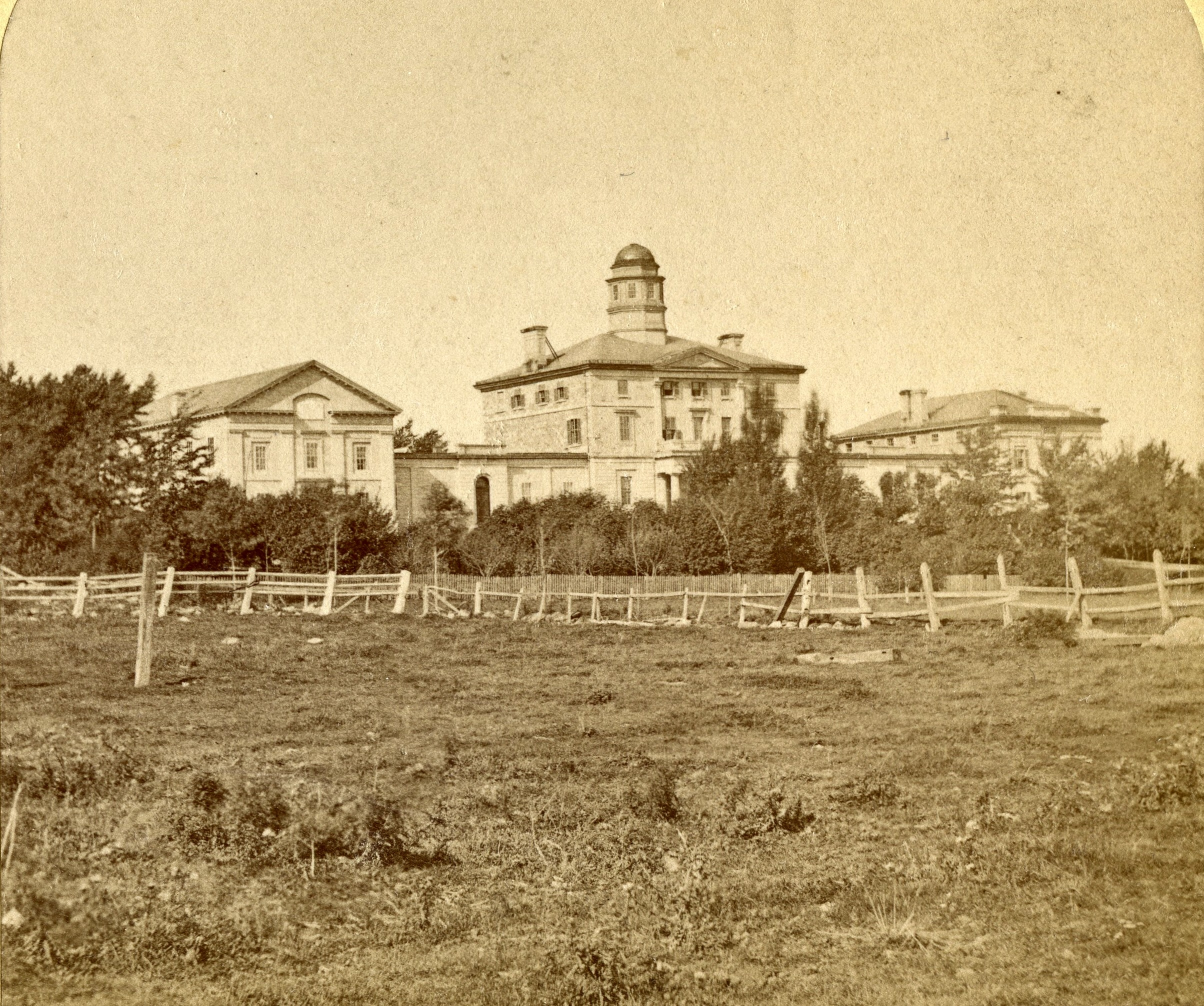
McGill College where John Abbott studied and graduated.

Abbott graduated as a Bachelor of Civil Law from McGill College (now McGill University) in Montreal in 1847, and in the same year was initiated in the St. Paul's Masonic Lodge, No. 374, E.R., in Montreal. In 1867, he graduated as a Doctor of Civil Law (DCL). Most of his legal practice was in corporate law; however, his most celebrated court case was the defence of at first fourteen, then upon release and recapture, four of those fourteen Confederate agents who had raided St. Albans, Vermont, from Canadian soil during the American Civil War. Abbott successfully argued that the Confederates were belligerents rather than criminals and therefore should not be extradited. He began lecturing in commercial and criminal law at McGill in 1853, and in 1855 he became a professor and dean of its Faculty of Law, where Wilfrid Laurier, a future prime minister of Canada, was among his students. He continued in this position until 1880. In 1862, he was made Queen's Counsel. Upon his retirement, McGill named him emeritus professor, and in 1881 appointed him to its Board of Governors.

== Politics ==
=== Early involvement ===
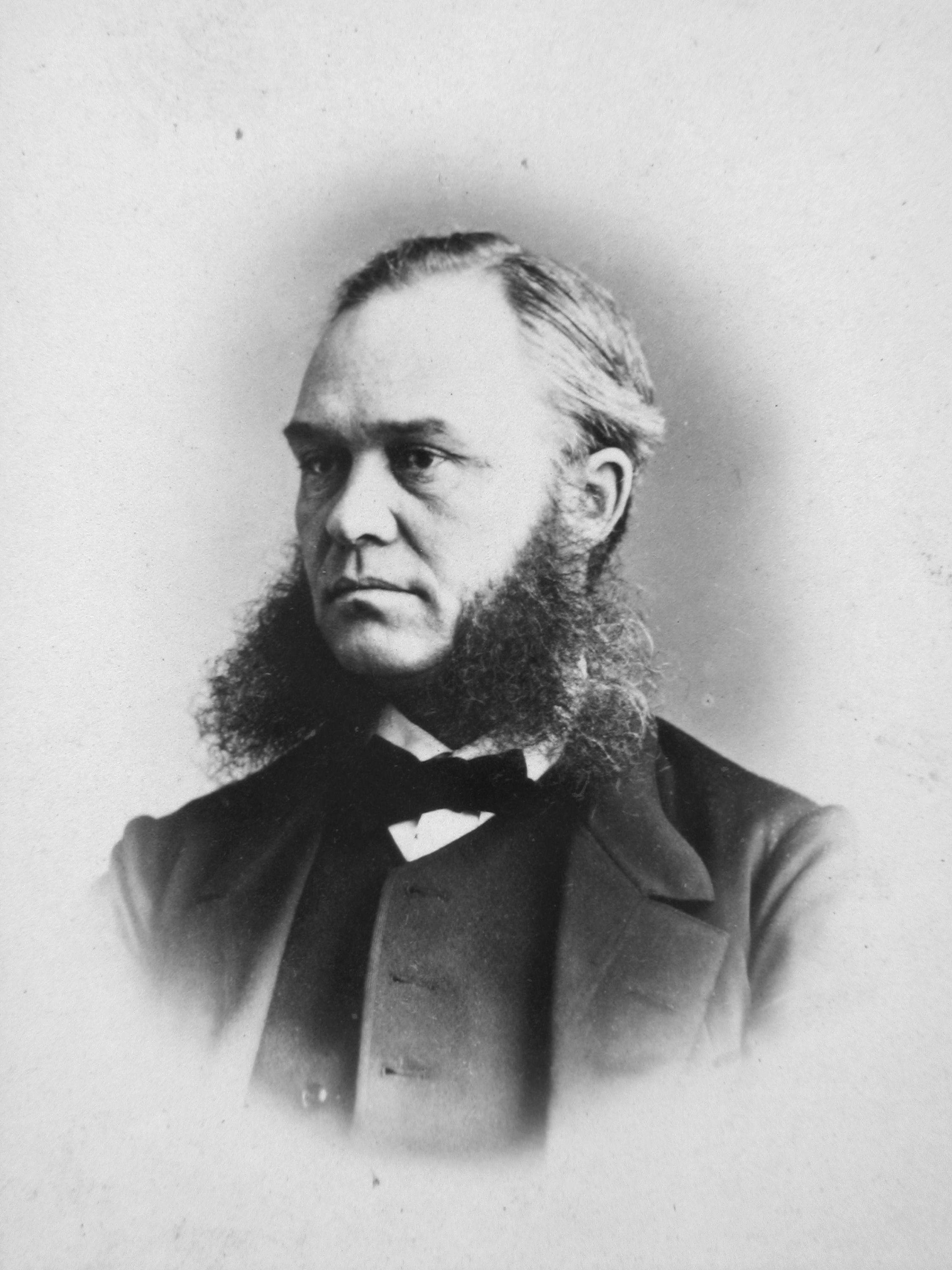
Abbott in 1863.

In 1849, he signed the Montreal Annexation Manifesto calling for Canada to join the United States, an action which he regretted later as a youthful error. He eventually joined the Loyal Orange Lodge of British North America, well known as a pro-British organization. Abbott first ran for the Legislative Assembly of the Province of Canada in 1857 in the Argenteuil district, northwest of Montreal. Defeated, he challenged the election results on the grounds of voting list irregularities and was eventually awarded the seat in 1860. He served as solicitor general for Lower Canada (Quebec) representing the liberal administration of John Sandfield Macdonald and Louis Sicotte, from 1862 until 1863. He reluctantly supported Canada's confederation, fearing the reduction of the political power of Lower Canada's English-speaking minority. In 1865, he converted to a conservative. His proposal to protect the electoral borders of 12 English Quebec constituencies was eventually incorporated into the British North America Act, 1867.

=== National politics ===
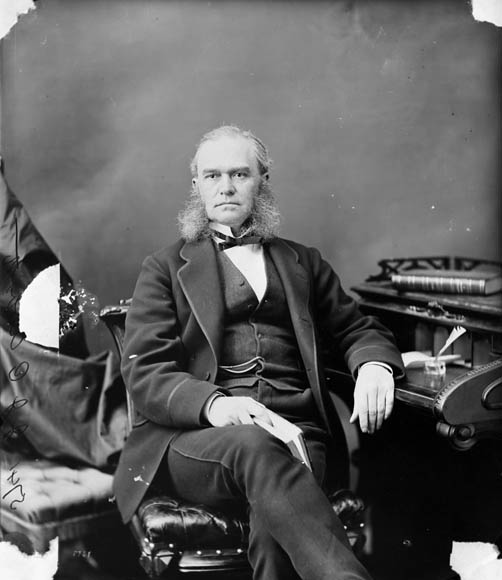
Abbott in 1870 as Dean of Law at McGill University.

Abbott was elected to the House of Commons in 1867 as member for Argenteuil. He was removed from his seat by petition in 1874 following his involvement in the Pacific Scandal. He narrowly lost the 1878 election, then won in February 1880, only to have his victory declared void because of bribery allegations. He was, however, subsequently elected in a by-election in August 1881. In 1887, Macdonald appointed him to the Senate. He served as Leader of the Government in the Senate from May 12, 1887, to October 30, 1893 (including his term as prime minister) and as Minister without Portfolio in Macdonald's cabinet. He also served two one-year terms as mayor of Montreal from 1887 to 1889.

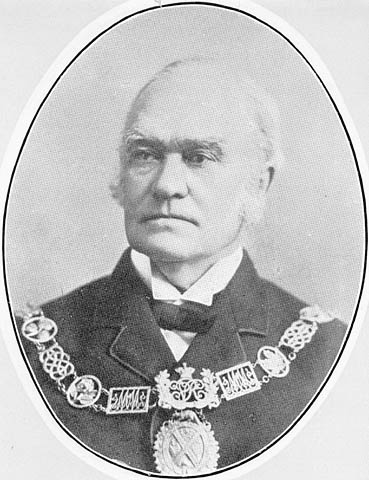
Abbott as Mayor of Montreal.

Abbott was involved in the promotion of several railway projects, including the Canadian Pacific Railway (CPR) (of which he served as president). He worked to incorporate and arrange financing for the first CPR syndicate. As legal advisor to its main financier, Sir Hugh Allan, Abbott was the recipient of the infamous telegram from Prime Minister Macdonald during the 1872 Canadian federal election campaign which read "I must have another ten thousand; will be the last time of calling; do not fail me; answer today." This telegram was stolen from Abbott's office and published, breaking the 1873 Pacific Scandal which brought down Macdonald's government. Abbott was subsequently a key organizer of a second syndicate which eventually completed the construction of Canada's first transcontinental railway in 1885, serving as its solicitor from 1880 to 1887 and as a director from 1885 to 1891.

=== Prime minister ===
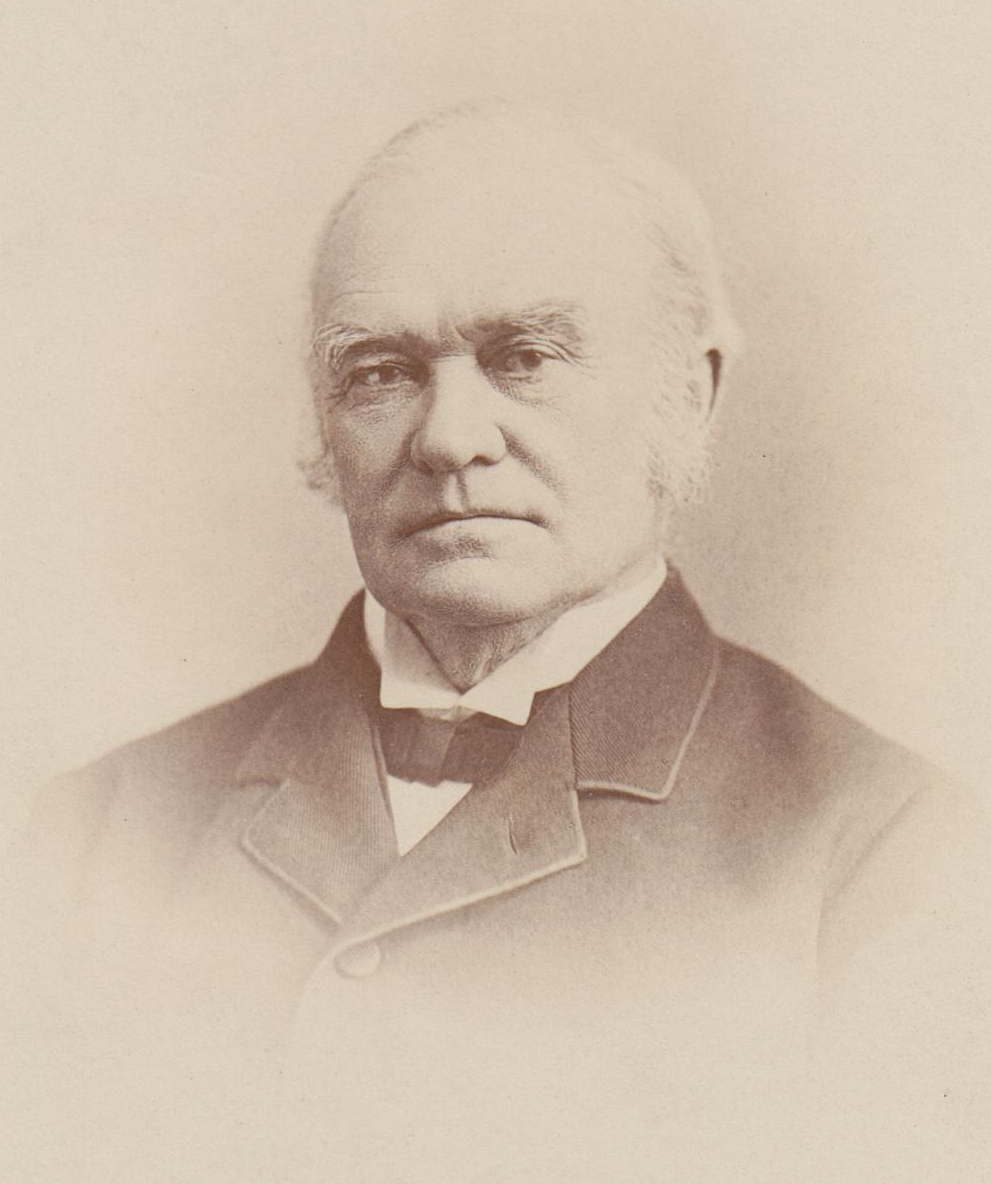
Prime Minister John Abbott in 1892.

When Prime Minister Macdonald died in office, Abbott supported John Thompson to succeed him, but reluctantly accepted the plea of the divided Conservative party that he should lead the government, though he considered himself a caretaker prime minister for his seventeen months in office. He was one of just two Canadian prime ministers, the other being Mackenzie Bowell, to have held the office while serving in the Senate rather than the House of Commons.

Soon after Abbott assumed office in 1891, Canada was plunged into an economic recession; later that same year he faced another challenge as the McGreevy-Langevin scandal came to light, revealing that Hector-Louis Langevin, former Minister of Public Works in the Conservative government, had conspired with contractor Thomas McGreevy to defraud the government.

Despite the political toll on his party, Abbott dealt with the backlog of government business awaiting him after Macdonald's death, including reform of the civil service and revisions of the criminal code. He attempted in 1892 to negotiate a new treaty of reciprocity with the United States, but failed to reach an agreement.

During his term, there were 52 by-elections, 42 of which were won by the Conservatives, increasing their majority by 13 seats—evidence of Abbott's effectiveness as prime minister. One year into his time as prime minister, Abbott attempted to turn the office over to Thompson, but this was rejected due to anti-Catholic sentiment in the Tory caucus.

== Later life ==
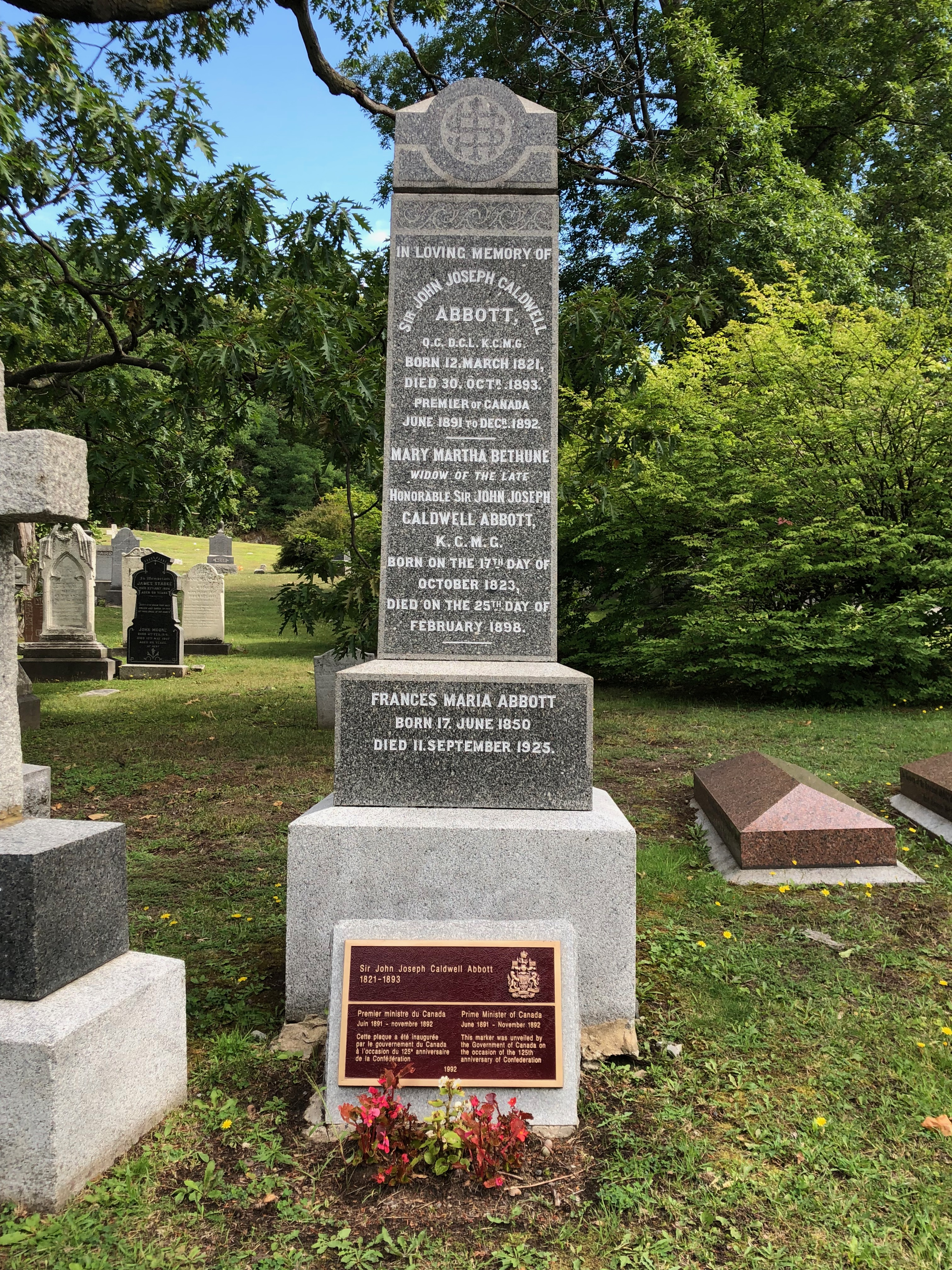
Abbott's funeral monument in Mount Royal Cemetery.

Suffering from the early stages of cancer of the brain, Abbott's health failed in 1892 and he retired to private life, whereupon Sir John Thompson finally became prime minister. Abbott died less than a year later at the age of 72.

Sir John Abbott is buried in the Mount Royal Cemetery, Montreal, Quebec.

== Legacy ==
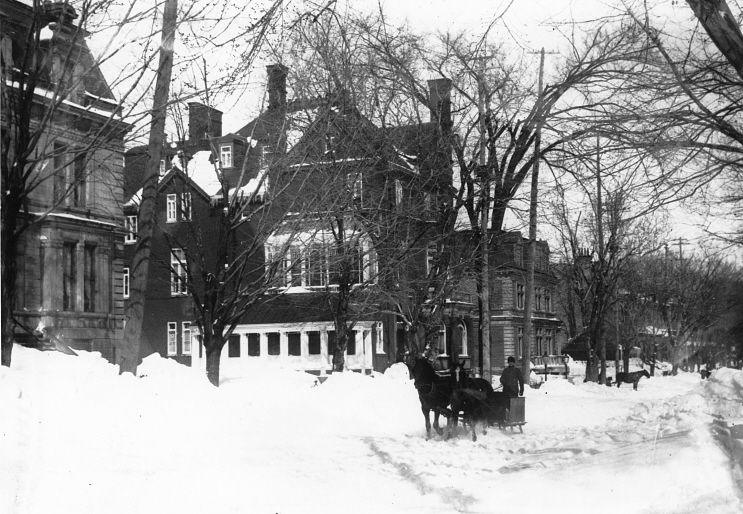
Sir John Abbott's house on Sherbrooke Street, Montreal, Quebec

John Abbott College in Sainte-Anne-de-Bellevue, Quebec, near Abbott's 300-acre (1.2 km^{2}) country estate (Boisbriant), is named after him.

He was named a Person of National Historic Significance by the Government of Canada in 1938.

His "most memorable" political comment is "I hate politics." The full quote was "I hate politics and what are considered their appropriate measures. I hate notoriety, public meetings, public speeches, caucuses and everything that I know of which is apparently the necessary incident of politics—except doing public work to the best of my ability."

In their 1999 look at the Canadian prime ministers through Jean Chrétien, J.L. Granatstein and Norman Hillmer included a survey of Canadian historians ranking the prime ministers. Abbott's term of service was considered below par and was ranked #17 out of 20 (up to then). When the survey was repeated in 2016, Abbott was ranked 7th out of ten "short-term" prime ministers with a score of 1.8 out of 5.

== See also ==
- List of Montreal mayors
- List of prime ministers of Canada
- List of notable Freemasons

Political offices
Preceded by Alexander Campbell	Leader of the Government in the Senate; 1887–1893	Succeeded by Mackenzie Bowell
Preceded by John A. Macdonald	Prime Minister of Canada; 1891–1892	Succeeded by John Thompson
Preceded by John A. Macdonald	Leader of the Conservative Party; 1891–1892	Succeeded by John Thompson
Preceded by Charles Carrol Colby	President of the Privy Council; 1891–1892	Succeeded by William Bullock Ives
