= James Gray Bethune =

Canadian businessman (1793-1841)

- Born: April 1, 1793; Upper Canada
- Died: October 13, 1841 (aged 48)
- Occupation: Businessman
- Spouse: Martha Covert

James Gray Bethune (April 1, 1793 – October 13, 1841) was born in Upper Canada. He was the son of the Reverend John Bethune of Williamstown, Ontario, the founding Church of Scotland minister for Upper Canada (Ontario).

James Gray was from a large family and four of the brothers had notable careers in Canada. Alexander Neil Bethune became the bishop of the diocese of Toronto. John Bethune was the acting principal of McGill University for over ten years. Angus Bethune was prominent in the fur trade and Donald Bethune was an important political figure in Upper Canada.

James had a career in business which began in 1812 after finishing school and moving to Cobourg, Upper Canada. By 1817 he was involved in a number of enterprises, namely; a store, sawmill, distillery and community postmaster.

Bethune's enterprises in the community made him well known and often admired personality. He was a justice of the peace, an officer of the court and lieutenant-colonel of the militia. He became an agent for the Bank of Upper Canada in 1830 and was promoted to cashier of the Cobourg branch. Bethune was also involved in the Cobourg and Peterborough Railway.

His lending policies ran counter to bank policies and ended in bankruptcy in 1834. He subsequently made an unsuccessful foray into politics (losing one of two seats representing Northumberland in the Legislative Assembly of Upper Canada) and had a brief stay in debtors' prison in 1836. His reputation was ruined and he moved away to New York state where he died after a protracted illness in Rochester, New York. Bethune was buried in Cobourg, Ontario.

Bethune married Martha Covert in 1830 and daughter Elizabeth Martha Bethune in 1831. He was predeceased by Elizabeth in 1831 and survived by Mary ( whom died in Toronto in 1843). Bethune and his family are buried at St. Peters Anglican Church in Peterborough.
