= Bethune baronets =

There have been two baronetcies created for persons with the surname Bethune, one in the Baronetage of Nova Scotia and one in the Baronetage of the United Kingdom.

- Sharp baronets of Scotscraig (1683), later Bethune baronets of Scotscraig (1683)
- Bethune baronets of Kilconquhar (1836): see the Earl of Lindsay
