= John Strachan =

Bishop of Toronto, headed the Family Compact of Upper Canada (1778–1867)

The Right Reverend John Strachan
- Bishop of Toronto
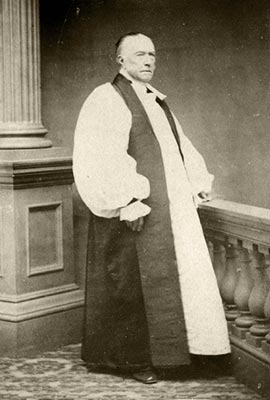
- Church: Church of England
- Diocese: Toronto
- Appointed: 1839
- In office: 1839–1867
- Successor: Alexander Bethune

Orders
- Ordination: 1803 (priest)
- Consecration: 1839

Personal details
- Born: 12 April 1778 Aberdeen, Scotland
- Died: 1 November 1867 (aged 89) Toronto, Ontario, Canada
- Buried: Beneath the high altar at the Cathedral Church of St. James, Toronto
- Denomination: Anglicanism
- Parents: Elizabeth Findlayson; John Strachan
- Spouse: Ann McGill (m. 1808; died 1865)
- Education: King's College, Aberdeen

1st President of King's College
- In office 1827–1848
- Chancellor: List: Peregrine Maitland; John Colborne; Francis Bond Head; Sir George Arthur; Charles Poulett Thomson; Charles Bagot; Charles Metcalfe; Charles Cathcart; James Bruce
- Preceded by: Position established
- Succeeded by: John McCaul

John Strachan (/ˈstrɔːn/; 12 April 1778 – 1 November 1867) was a Scottish-born clergyman, educator, and politician who was the first president of the University of Toronto, serving from 1827 to 1848. A notable figure in Upper Canada and an "elite member" of the Family Compact, Strachan was the first Anglican Bishop of Toronto. He is best known as a political bishop who held many government positions and promoted education from common schools to helping to found King's College, which later became the University of Toronto.

Gauvreau says in the 1820s he was "the most eloquent and powerful Upper Canadian exponent of an anti-republican social order based upon the tory principles of hierarchy and subordination in both church and state". Craig characterizes him as "the Canadian arch tory of his era" for his intense conservatism. Craig argues that Strachan "believed in an ordered society, an established church, the prerogative of the crown, and prescriptive rights; he did not believe that the voice of the people was the voice of God".

Strachan built his home in a large yard bound by Simcoe Street, York Street, and Front Street. It was a two-storey building that was the first building in Toronto to use locally manufactured bricks. The gardens and grounds of the property occupied the entire square and became a local Toronto landmark, being given the name "The Bishop's Palace". After Strachan's death, the home was converted into a private hotel called The Palace Boarding House.

== Early life ==
Born 12 April 1778, Strachan was the youngest of six children born to the overseer of a granite quarry in Aberdeen, Scotland. His father's name was John Strachan and his mother's name was Elizabeth Findlayson. He graduated from King's College, Aberdeen, in 1797 with an Master of Arts degree. After his father died in an accident in 1794, Strachan tutored students and taught school to finance his own education. He emigrated to Kingston, Upper Canada in 1799, to tutor the children of Richard Cartwright. He applied to the pulpit of a Presbyterian church in Montreal but did not receive the position. He then became an Anglican minister and became a minister for a church in Cornwall, Upper Canada.

Strachan taught at a grammar school which was attended by the Upper Canadian elite. Strachan taught more than 20 students in 1804 and had about 40 by 1808. The children educated were trained to be "potential rulers of the next generation" by Strachan. Prime example being a fatherless boy of 12, named John Beverley Robinson who came to Strachan for education within a few weeks of Strachan's settling in Cornwall. Robinson would become the eventual leader of the Family Compact.

He married Ann McGill née Wood, widow of Andrew McGill, in the spring of 1807. Together they had nine children, some born in Cornwall and some in York - some children died young. Strachan and McGill would have 3 children in Cornwall, and 6 children in York. The children born in Cornwall were James (1808), Elizabeth (1810, died in 1812), and George Cartwright (1812). The children born in York were Elizabeth Mary (1814), John (1815), Alexander Wood (1817), and Agnes (1822, died "before reaching 17th birthday"). Additionally in York, two daughters were born who died as infants.

== War of 1812 ==
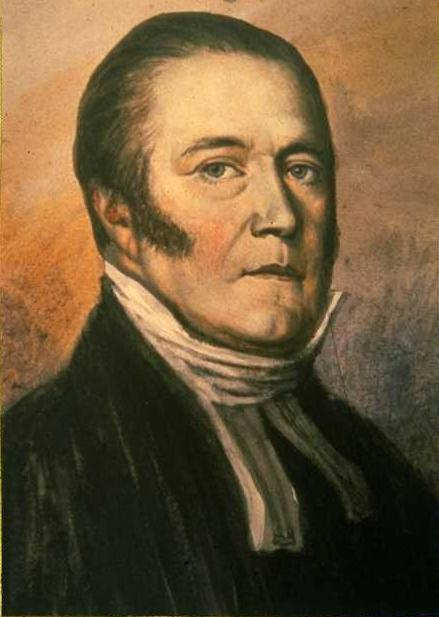
Portrait of Strachan

He moved to York, Upper Canada, just before the War of 1812, where he became rector of St. James' Church (which would later become his cathedral) and headmaster of the Home District Grammar School. This school, also known as "The Blue School," taught students from five to seventeen and emphasized a practical means of learning. Students recited abridged speeches from the House of Commons, learned Latin, and were encouraged to ask questions of their fellow pupils.

A conservative, Strachan supported his nation during the War of 1812, using his sermons to support the suspension of civil liberties. Upon hearing that of the fall of Fort Detroit to British forces, Strachan declared in a sermon: "The brilliant victory... has been of infinite service in confirming the wavering & adding spirit to the loyal". Strachan had the young women of York knit flags for the militia regiments in which their menfolk were serving in and organized fundraising drives to give the militiamen serving on the Niagara frontier shoes and clothing.

In December 1812, Strachan founded the Loyal and Patriotic Society of Upper Canada which raised £21,500 to support the families of militiaman and care for the wounded. On 27 April 1813, during the Battle of York, along with senior Canadian militia officers Strachan negotiated the surrender of the city with American Major General Henry Dearborn. The Americans violated the terms of surrender by looting private homes, churches and government buildings along with locking wounded British and Canadian troops in a hospital without food or water for two days. Strachan went to meet to complain in person to Dearborn about the violation of the terms of surrender and shamed him into imposing order on his troops.

Following the battle, Strachan sent his wife Anne and their children to Cornwall because he believed they would be safe there. A few months later, Cornwall was raided by American troops, who looted the Strachan home and likely raped a then-pregnant Anne. Following the British Burning of Washington on 24 August 1814, which was denounced by Thomas Jefferson, Strachan wrote a letter to Jefferson on 30 January 1815 in which he stated:

In April, 1813 the public buildings at York, the capital of Upper Canada, were burnt by troops of the United States, contrary to the articles of capitulation. They consisted of two elegant halls with convenient offices for the accommodation of the Legislature and of the Courts of Justice. The library and all the papers and records belonging to these institutions were consumed; at the same time the church was robbed and the town library totally pillaged. Commodore Chauncey, who has generally behaved honourably, was so ashamed of this last transaction that he endeavoured to collect the books belonging to the library and actually sent back two boxes filled with them, but hardly any were complete. Much private property was plundered and several houses left in a state of ruin. Can you tell me why the public buildings and the library at Washington should be held more sacred than those at York?

=== Family Compact ===
After the war, he became a pillar of the Family Compact, the conservative elite that controlled the colony. He was a member of the Executive Council of Upper Canada from 1815 to 1836 as well as the Legislative Council from 1820 to 1841. He was an influential advisor to the Lieutenant-Governors of Upper Canada and the other members of the Councils and Assemblies, many of whom were his former students. The "Family Compact" were the elite who shared his fierce loyalty to the British monarchy, his strict and exclusive Toryism and the established church (Anglicanism), and his contempt for slavery, Presbyterians, Methodists, American republicanism, and reformism. Strachan was a leader of anti-American elements, which he saw as a republican and democratic threat that promised chaos and an end to a well-ordered society. In 1822 he was appointed an honorary member of the Bank of Upper Canada.

Strachan invented the "militia myth" to the effect that the local militia had done more to defend Canada than the British Army, which has been rejected by Canadian historians.

Strachan supported a strict interpretation of the Constitutional Act of 1791, claiming that clergy reserves were to be given to the Church of England alone, rather than to Protestants in general. In 1826, his interpretation was opposed by Egerton Ryerson, who advocated the separation of church and state and argued that the reserves should be sold for the benefit of education in the province. Although Strachan long controlled the reserves through the Clergy Corporation, he was ultimately forced to oversee the selling off of most of the land in 1854.

=== Educational interests ===
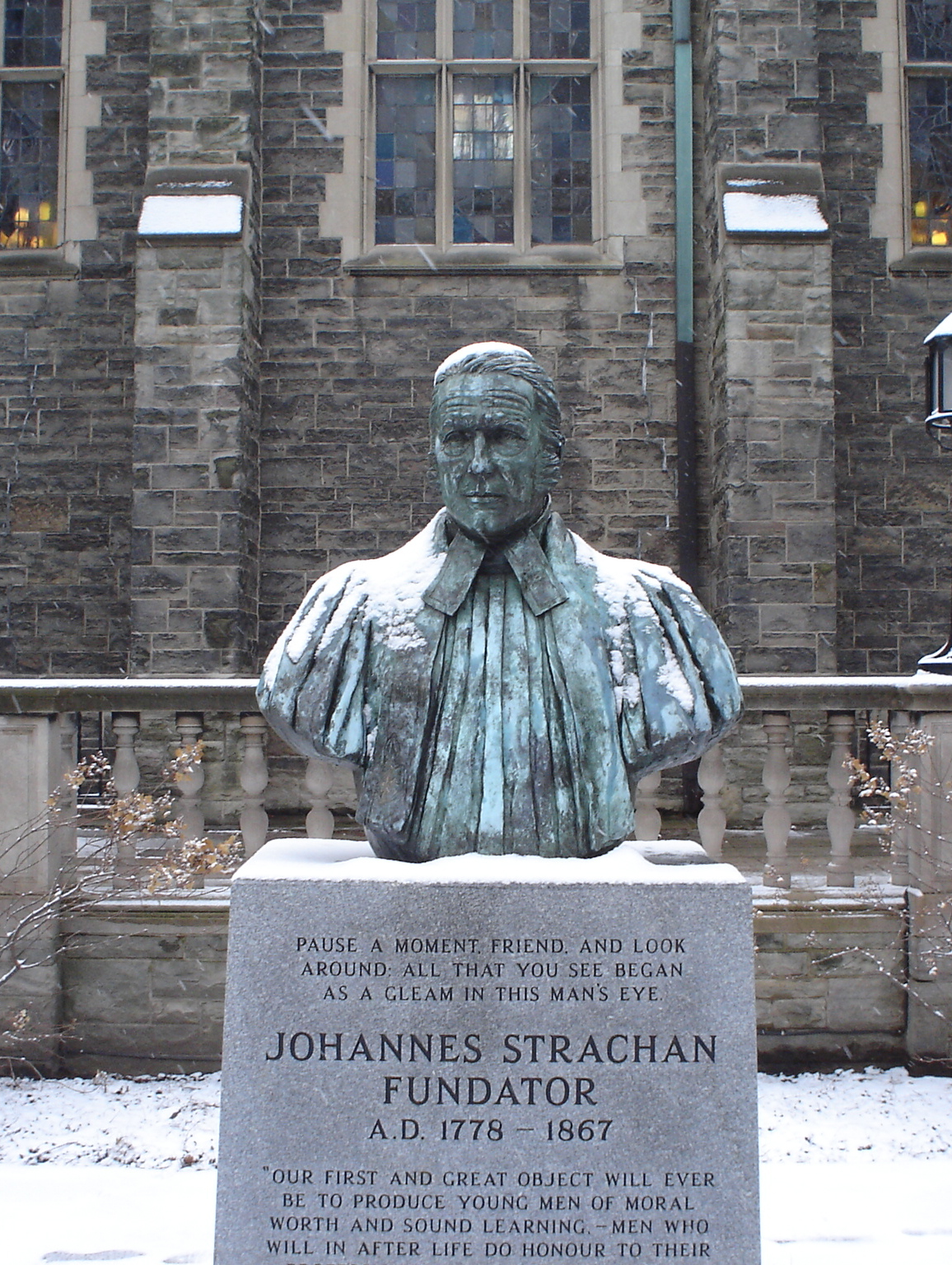
The bust of Strachan in the Trinity quad, Trinity College, Toronto

Much of Strachan's life and work was focused on education. He wanted Upper Canada to be under Church of England control to avoid American influence. He tried to set up annual reviews for grammar schools to make sure they were following Church of England doctrines and tried to introduce Andrew Bell's education system from Britain, but those acts were vetoed by the Legislative Assembly. In 1827 Strachan chartered King's College, an Anglican university, although it was not actually created until 1843.

In 1839, he was consecrated the first Anglican bishop of Toronto alongside Aubrey Spencer, the first Bishop of Newfoundland, at Lambeth Palace August 4. He founded Trinity College in 1851 after King's College was secularized as the University of Toronto.

In 1835, he was forced to resign from the Executive Council, and he resigned from politics in 1841 after the Act of Union. He continued to influence his former students although the Family Compact declined in the new Province of Canada. Strachan helped organize the Lambeth Conference of Anglican bishops in 1867 but died that year before it was held. Strachan was buried in a vault in the chancel of St. James' Cathedral. He was succeeded by Alexander Neil Bethune.

Strachan was elected a member of the American Antiquarian Society in 1846.

=== First Nations ===
Strachan was concerned with the Natives and called on people to embrace the "sons of nature" as brothers. He claimed that the United States desired Upper Canada primarily to exterminate the indigenous tribes and free up the West for American expansion. Strachan defended the autonomy of the Natives, the superiority of British governance, and the centrality of Upper Canada in the theatre of war against the US. He rejected the prevalent assumption at the time that Natives were simply pawns in the contest and gave an original and influential explanation of why Upper Canada was vital to both Native and Imperial concerns.

=== High-church views ===
Strachan was intensely devoted to the promotion of the Anglican position in Canada. He was born a Presbyterian in Scotland, but he never fully accepted it and first received communion at an Anglican church in Kingston. He was strongly influenced by the high-church bishop of New York, John H. Hobart. Strachan preached that the Anglican Church was a branch of the universal church and that it was independent of both pope and king.

Strachan defended the Church of England from opponents who wanted to reduce its influence in Upper Canada. He published a sermon that said a Christian nation needs a religious establishment, referring to the Anglican church as the establishment. He rejected the notion that clergy reserves were intended for all Protestant denominations and appealed to the Colonial Office to maintain that Anglican Church's monopoly on these plots of land.

Like most Protestants of the era, he denounced the Roman Catholic Church for corruption. He rejected the revivalism of the Methodists as an American heresy and stressed the ancient practices and historic liturgy of his church. While a high churchman, Strachan's view alienated many of his clergy and laity who were drawn from the ranks of Irish Protestant immigrants of more low-church persuasion.

Strachan wanted more funds disseminated to build church infrastructure in rural Upper Canada. While fundraising in England his trustworthiness was challenged when he created an Ecclesiastical Chart of the religious statistics of Upper Canada that contained numerous errors. He actively promoted missionary work, using the Diocesan Theological Institute at Cobourg to train clergy to handle frontier conditions. Much of his effort after 1840 was undermined by theological disputes in the church, such as between high-church tractarians and low-church evangelicals. He also faced external attacks from political reformers and rival denominations.

== Death and legacy ==
Strachan died on 1 November 1867 in Toronto. His funeral procession took place on November 5, and wound through the city streets from his home at Front and York to St. James Cathedral.

A plaque at the University of Toronto erected by the Ontario Archaeological and Historic Sites Board commemorates the residence of Strachan. The Bishop's Palace is the site where assembled the Loyalist forces that defeated William Lyon Mackenzie during the Rebellion of 1837.

On this site stood the "Bishop's palace", residence of Bishop John Strachan (1778–1867), built in 1817–18 while he was the incumbent of St. James Church. Born in Scotland, he came to Upper Canada in 1799 where he achieved prominence as an educator and churchman and was consecrated first Anglican Bishop of Toronto in 1839. He served as a member of the province's Legislative Council 1820–41 and of the Executive Council 1815–36. During the Rebellion of 1837, the Loyalist forces that defeated William Lyon Mackenzie near Montgomery's Tavern assembled on the grounds of the Palace."

In the summer of 2004, a bust of John Strachan was erected in the quadrangle of Trinity College at the University of Toronto. Strachan Avenue, running from the original site of Trinity College to Lake Shore Blvd., is also named in his honour.
