= Fleming (surname) =

Fleming is a surname of Scottish, Irish and English origin, indicating an ultimate descent from a Flemish immigrant, part of modern-day Belgium.

== Military ==
- Alva Fleming (1905–1985), U.S. Navy veteran, VFW California state commander
- Austin Lloyd Fleming (1894–1969), Canadian flying ace
- Clas Fleming (admiral) (1592–1644), Swedish admiral
- Henrik Fleming (1584–1650), Finnish-Swedish admiral
- James P. Fleming (born 1943), United States Air Force pilot, Medal of Honor recipient
- Jerzy Detloff Fleming (1699–1771), Saxon general and nobleman
- Klaus Fleming (1535–1597), Swedish admiral
- Lawrence J. Fleming (1922–2006) U.S. Air Force Major General
- Richard E. Fleming (1917–1942), American war hero
- Valentine Fleming (1882–1917), Scottish politician and war hero

== Music, art and literature ==
- Amaryllis Fleming (1925–1999), British musician
- Andrew Fleming (born 1963), American screenwriter and director
- Anne Fleming (writer) (born 1964), Canadian writer
- Atholl Fleming (1894–1972), British actor and radio personality
- Berry Fleming (1899–1989), American novelist
- Connie Fleming, American supermodel
- Crystal Marie Fleming (born 1981), American sociologist and author
- David Fleming (writer) (1940–2010), English environmental writer
- Don Fleming (musician) (born 1957), American musician and producer
- Ian Fleming (1908–1964), British writer and journalist
- Jacky Fleming (born 1955), cartoonist
- Justin Fleming (born 1953), Australian author and playwright
- Jay Fleming, American photographer
- Kevin Fleming, American photographer
- King Fleming (1922–2014), American musician
- Paul Fleming (poet) (1609–1640), Germany
- Peter Fleming (writer) (1907–1971), British writer, elder brother of Ian
- Renée Fleming (born 1959), American opera singer
- Rosie Nangala Fleming (born 1928), Australian artist
- Shirley Fleming (1929–2005), American music critic and magazine editor
- Tom Fleming (1927–2010), Scottish actor, director and poet
- Tom Fleming (racing driver) (born 2002), British racing driver
- Tommy Fleming (born 1971), Irish musician

== Politics and law ==
- Amalia Fleming (1909–1986), Greek activist and parliamentarian
- Catherine Fleming Bruce (née Fleming; born 1961), American politician
- Chummy Fleming (1863–1950), Australian union leader
- Claes Larsson Fleming (1592–1644), Swedish admiral
- David Pinkerton Fleming (1877–1944), Scottish politician
- Donald Fleming (1905–1986), Canadian parliamentarian
- Elaine Fleming, American politician
- Erik R. Fleming (born 1965), American politician
- Francis Fleming (colonial administrator) (1842–1922), British colonial administrator
- Francis P. Fleming (1841–1908), Florida politician
- Henry Fleming (1871–1956), Northern Irish unionist politician
- John Fleming (U.S. politician) (born 1951)
- Kieran Fleming (1959–1984), Irish republican
- Lethia Cousins Fleming (1876–1963), American suffragist, teacher, civil rights activist and politician.
- Louis-Constant Fleming (born 1946), San Martin politician, France
- M. Brendan Fleming (1926–2016), American politician
- Malcolm Fleming, 3rd Lord Fleming (1494–1547), Lord Chamberlain of Scotland to James V of Scotland
- Osbourne Fleming (born 1940), Anguilla politician
- Peter E. Fleming Jr. (1929–2009), American attorney
- Pieter Kenyon Fleming-Voltelyn van der Byl (1923–1999), Rhodesian politician
- Robben Wright Fleming (1916–2010), American law professor and educator
- Seymour Dorothy Fleming (1758–1818), British noblewoman
- Solomon S. Fleming (1812–1901), American politician and merchant
- Valentine Fleming (1882–1917), British politician
- Wilmot Fleming (1916–1978), American politician

== Religion ==
- Sir George Fleming, 2nd Baronet (1667–1747), Bishop of Carlisle
- Heinrich Fleming, Bishop of Warmia (1278–1300)
- Michael Anthony Fleming (1792–1850), Irish-born Roman Catholic bishop in Newfoundland
- Pete Fleming (1928–1956), American missionary to Ecuador
- Richard Fleming (bishop) (1385–1431), English minister
- Thomas Fleming (1593–1665) Roman Catholic Archbishop of Dublin

== Science and engineering ==
- Alexander Fleming (1881–1955), Scottish scientist, discoverer of penicillin
- Arthur Percy Morris Fleming (1881–1960), English electrical engineer
- Bonnie Fleming, American particle physicist
- Charles Fleming (ornithologist) (1916–1987)
- D. F. Fleming, American historian
- John Fleming (naturalist) (1785–1857), Scottish naturalist
- John Adam Fleming, American physicist
- John Ambrose Fleming, English physicist and engineer
- Karen Fleming, American biophysicist
- Sandford Fleming (1827–1915) Scottish-born Canadian engineer
- Wendy Fleming, New Zealand expert on Alzheimer's disease and dementia
- Williamina Fleming (1857–1911), Scottish astronomer
- Joe Fleming (1987–), British Scientist and Engineer

== Sport ==
- Bernard Fleming (born 1937), Scottish footballer
- Brittyn Fleming (born 1999), American ice hockey player
- Charlie Fleming (footballer) (1927–1997), Scottish footballer
- Colin Fleming (born 1984), Scottish tennis player
- Craig Fleming (born 1971), British footballer
- Curtis Fleming (born 1968), Irish footballer
- Damien Fleming (born 1970), Australian cricketer
- Dave Fleming (baseball) (born 1969), American baseball player
- Deborah Fleming (born 1991), English rugby sevens player
- Derek Fleming (born 1973), Scottish footballer
- Don Fleming (American football) (1937–1963)
- Dontae Fleming (born 2001), American football player
- Doug Fleming, Australian rugby league footballer
- Flint Fleming (born 1965), American football player
- Gary Fleming (born 1967), Northern Ireland footballer
- Greg Fleming, various people
- Guillermo Fleming (1934–2020), Peruvian footballer
- Hannah Fleming (born 1991), Scottish curler
- Haydn Fleming (born 1978), English footballer
- Jessie Fleming (born 1998), Canadian soccer player
- Jimmy Fleming (footballer born 1901) (1901–1969), Scottish footballer
- John Fleming (footballer, born 1890) (1890–1916), Scottish footballer
- Josh Fleming (baseball) (born 1996), American baseball player
- Josh Fleming (cricketer) (born 1989), English cricketer
- Julian Fleming (born 2000), American football player
- Marv Fleming (born 1942) American football player
- Matthew Fleming (born 1964), British cricketer
- Paul Fleming (boxer) (born 1988), Australian boxer
- Peggy Fleming (born 1948), American figure skater
- Peter Fleming (tennis) (born 1955), American tennis player
- Rasheer Fleming (born 2004), American basketball player
- Reg Fleming (1936–2009), Canadian hockey player
- Rikki Fleming (1946–2025), Scottish footballer
- Rudymar Fleming (born 1980), Venezuelan martial artist
- Samuel Fleming (fl. 1910s), Scottish footballer for Hibernian and Clyde
- Scott Flemming (born 1958), American basketball coach
- Stephen Fleming (born 1973), New Zealand cricketer
- Terry Fleming (born 1973), British footballer
- Tommy Fleming (soccer) (1890–1965), Scottish-American soccer player
- Valerie Fleming (born 1976), American bobsledder
- Vern Fleming (born 1962), American basketball player
- Wayne Fleming (1950–2013), Canadian ice hockey coach
- Darren Fleming(born 1971), American basketball player

== Theatre and television ==
- Ann Marie Fleming (born 1962), Canadian filmmaker, writer, and visual artist
- Art Fleming (1924–1995), American television personality
- Cailey Fleming (born 2007), American actress
- Charlie Fleming (born 2008), Filipino-British actress and model
- Erin Fleming (1941–2003), Canadian actress
- Jaqueline Fleming (born 1977), American actress
- Joy Fleming (1944–2017), German musician
- Kate Fleming (1965–2006), American audio-book narrator and producer
- Lucy Fleming (born 1947), British actress
- Maxine Fleming, New Zealand television screenwriter and producer
- Mike Fleming, American radio show host
- Rhonda Fleming (1923–2020), American actress
- Thea Fleming (born 1942), Dutch film actress
- Victor Fleming (1889–1949), American film director

== Other ==
- Arthur Fleming, namesake of Fleming House at the California Institute of Technology
- David Fleming (disambiguation)
- Donald Fleming (disambiguation)
- Eric Fleming (disambiguation)
- Harold Fleming (disambiguation)
- James Fleming (disambiguation)
- John Fleming (disambiguation)
- Karl Fleming (1927–2012), American journalist
- Katherine Fleming (disambiguation)
  - Katherine Elizabeth Fleming, professor of history and administrator at New York University
- Klas Fleming (disambiguation) (or Klas, Class, Claes or Klaus), numerous people
- Marcus Fleming (1911–1976), British economist
- Mary Fleming (f. 1550s), lady-in-waiting to Mary, Queen of Scots
- Mary Jane McCaffree (née Fleming; 1911–2018), American political secretary and protocol author
- Nancy Fleming (born 1942), 1961 Miss America
- Robert Fleming (disambiguation)
- Sean Fleming (disambiguation)
- Thomas Fleming (disambiguation)
- William Fleming (disambiguation)
- Yonnette Fleming, American urban farmer

== Fictional characters ==
- Bob Fleming, on The Fast Show
- Lancelot Fleming, in the TV series Monarch of the Glen
- Peter Fleming, Danish detective and collaborator with the Nazis in the novel Hornet Flight by Ken Follett
- Henry Fleming, main character of Stephen Crane's novel The Red Badge of Courage
- Aubrey Flemming, main character of the 2007 psychological thriller I Know Who Killed Me.
- Ms. Pauline Fleming, a teacher in the 1988 teen film Heathers and its 2014 musical adaptation
- Nicki Fleming, American Girl character, "Girl of the Year" for 2007
- Sharona Fleming, in the TV series Monk (1998–2004)
- Io Fleming, in Mobile Suit Gundam Thunderbolt December Sky and Mobile Suit Gundam Thunderbolt Bandit Flower
