= John Fleming =

John Fleming may refer to:

== Politics ==
- John Fleming (14th-century MP) for Rochester
- John Fleming, 1st Earl of Wigtown (1567–1619), Scottish aristocrat and diplomat
- John Fleming, 2nd Lord Fleming (c. 1465–1524), Scottish nobleman
- John Fleming, 5th Lord Fleming (1529–1572), Lord Chamberlain of Scotland, 1565–1572
- John Fleming (Canadian politician) (1819–1877), Ontario businessman and political figure
- John Fleming (Devonport MP), 19th-century politician
- John Fleming (Louisiana politician) (born 1951), Republican U.S. representative for Louisiana's 4th congressional district
- John Fleming (Montana politician), member of the Montana House of Representatives
- John Fleming (Scottish politician) (1847–1925), Liberal MP for Aberdeen South
- John Fleming (Southampton MP) (1743–1802), Tory politician in England
- John Fleming (Gatton and Saltash MP) (1747–1829), British surgeon, naturalist, and politician
- John M. Fleming (1832–1900), American politician and newspaper editor
- John Willis Fleming (1781–1844), MP for Hampshire and South Hampshire

== Sport ==
- Jack Fleming (footballer) (John Fleming, 1876–1933), Australian rules footballer
- Jackie Fleming (John Fleming), English rugby league footballer
- John Fleming (footballer, born 1889) (1889–1916), Scottish footballer
- John Fleming (footballer, born 1953), English footballer
- John Fleming (rugby union) (born 1953), New Zealand rugby union player
- John Fleming (sport shooter) (1881–1965), British sport shooter
- John Fleming (1901–1961), Scottish boxer who fought under the name Johnny Brown
- Jock Fleming (1864–1934), Scottish footballer
- John Fleming (bowls), Scottish lawn bowler

== Other people ==
- John Fleming (art historian) (1919–2001), British art historian
- John Fleming (Australian priest) (born 1943), Australian priest and bioethicist
- John Fleming (bishop) (born 1948), Irish Roman Catholic clergyman
- John Fleming (dean of Ross)
- John Fleming (DJ) (born 1969), English trance producer and DJ
- John Fleming (engineer) (born 1951), Liverpool-born former head of Ford of Europe
- John Fleming (judge) (1697–1766), American judge in Virginia
- John Fleming (naturalist) (1785–1857), Scottish zoologist and geologist
- John Fleming (New York judge) (1842–1918), Queens County district attorney and New York judge
- John Fleming (painter) (1792–1845), Scottish painter
- Sir John Fleming, 1st Baronet, Irish baronet
- John Adam Fleming (1877–1956), American physicist
- John Ambrose Fleming (1849–1945), English electrical engineer and inventor of the Fleming Valve
- John Arnold Fleming (1871–1966), industrial chemist
- John Gibson Fleming (1809–1879), Scottish surgeon and medical administrator
- John Henry Fleming (1816–1894), ringleader of the Myall Creek massacre
- John V. Fleming (1936–2026), American literary critic and professor

== See also ==
- John Le Fleming (1865–1942), English cricketer and rugby union player
- John Flammang Schrank (1876–1943), American who attempted to assassinate Theodore Roosevelt
- Jack Fleming (1924–2001), American sports announcer
- John Flemming (1941–2003), English economist and Wadham College warden
- John Flemming (racing driver) (born 1967), Canadian racing driver
- John Fleeming, 18th-century American printer
