= Michael Fleming =

Michael or Mike Fleming may refer to:

- Sir Michael le Fleming, 4th Baronet (1748–1806), member of parliament for Westmorland
- Michael Anthony Fleming (1792–1850), bishop of Newfoundland
- Michael P. Fleming (born 1963), Texas-based lawyer
- Michael Fleming (historian), professor of history at the Polish University Abroad in London
- Mike Fleming (talk radio host), American conservative radio talk show host
- Mike Fleming (footballer), English footballer
- Mick Fleming (Gaelic footballer), Irish Gaelic footballer
- Mick Fleming (hurler), Irish hurler
- Mick Fleming (pastor) (born 1966), English pastor
- Michael Fleming (MP) (1668–1718), member of parliament for Westmorland, 1707–1708
- Michael Fleming (musician) (born 1935), American jazz bassist; see I Talk with the Spirits

== See also ==
- Jonah Byrde, a character from Ozark who uses "Michael Fleming" as an alias
