= Josh Fleming =

Josh Fleming may refer to:

- Josh Fleming (baseball) (born 1996), American baseball pitcher
- Josh Fleming (cricketer) (born 1989), English cricketer
