= James Fleming =

James, Jim, or Jimmy Fleming may refer to:

== Sports ==
- James Fleming (rugby union, born 1987), Scottish rugby union player
- James Fleming (cricketer) (1901–1962), Scottish cricketer and curler
- Jim Fleming (American football) (born 1959), college football coach
- Jim Fleming (footballer, born 1942) (1942–2020), footballer for Partick Thistle, Luton Town, Dunfermline Athletic and Hearts
- Jim Fleming (rugby union, born 1951), retired Scottish rugby union referee
- Jimmy Fleming (footballer, born 1901) (1901–1969), Scottish footballer for Rangers
- Jimmy Fleming (footballer, born 1929) (1929–2019), Scottish footballer

== Politics and nobility ==
- James Fleming (Nova Scotia politician) (1741–1839), farmer, businessman and politician from Nova Scotia
- James Fleming (Peel MP) (1839–1902), lawyer and member of the Canadian House of Commons representing Peel
- James Fleming (York West MP) (1939–2023), former broadcaster and member of the Canadian House of Commons representing York West in Toronto, Ontario
- James Fleming, 7th Baron Slane (bef. 1442–1492), member of the Irish Parliament and sheriff of County Meath
- James Fleming, 4th Lord Fleming (c. 1530–1558), Lord Chamberlain of Scotland
- James Ellis Fleming, claimant to title of 20th Baron Slane, fl. 1824–1832

== Other ==
- James Fleming (author) (1944–2024), author of the "Charlie Doig" thrillers
- James Fleming (British Army officer) (1682–1751), British major-general
- James Fleming (lawyer) (1831–1914), Scottish lawyer
- James Fleming (priest) (1830–1908), clergyman of the Church of England
- James E. Fleming (born 1954), American lawyer and professor of law
- James Henry Fleming (1872–1940), Canadian ornithologist
- James P. Fleming (born 1943), American military pilot who received the Medal of Honor
- James Rodger Fleming (born 1949), historian of science and technology
- James Simpson Fleming (1828–1899), Scottish lawyer and banker
- James W. Fleming (1867–1928), American businessman, banker and politician
