= Nelson Monument, Glasgow =

Monument in Glasgow, Scotland

Coordinates: 55°51′05″N 4°14′26″W

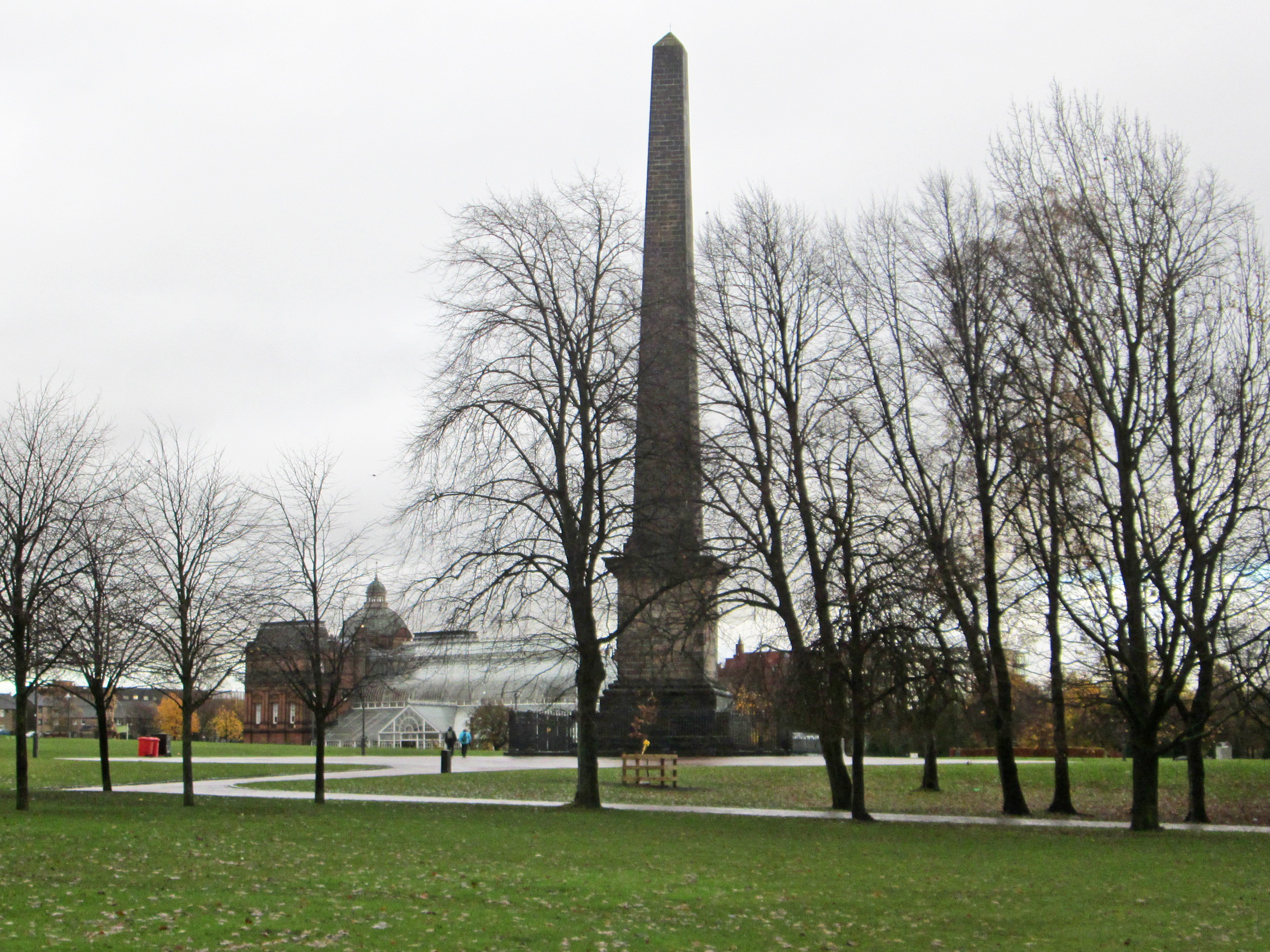
The Nelson Monument on Glasgow Green, in front of the People's Palace.

The Nelson Monument located within Glasgow Green (a historic public park in Glasgow, Scotland) is a commemorative obelisk built in honour of Vice Admiral Horatio Nelson, who had died at the Battle of Trafalgar on 21 October 1805. Funds of £2,075 were raised by subscription, and the foundation stone of the monument was laid with full ceremony on 1 August 1806, on the anniversary of the battle of Aboukir. The monument was finished on 7 August 1807, believed to be the first completed in the UK. It was decorated with four flags, a large crowd watched, and ships at the Broomielaw had their flags hoisted all day. A decision had not then been made on intended inscriptions.

The obelisk was designed by the architect David Hamilton. The monument stands 144 feet (44 m) tall, and is enclosed by cast iron railings. There are inscriptions on the four sides of its square plinth; one names him as Horatio, Viscount Nelson, and gives the dates of his birth and death, the other three give the name and date of the battles of Aboukir, Copenhagen, and Trafalgar.

The monument has been described as the first in the UK to celebrate Nelson's victory at Trafalgar. A plaque in front of the column says it was the first civic monument in Britain to Nelson's victories, funded by a public subscription. The monument was constructed by the mason A. Brockett.

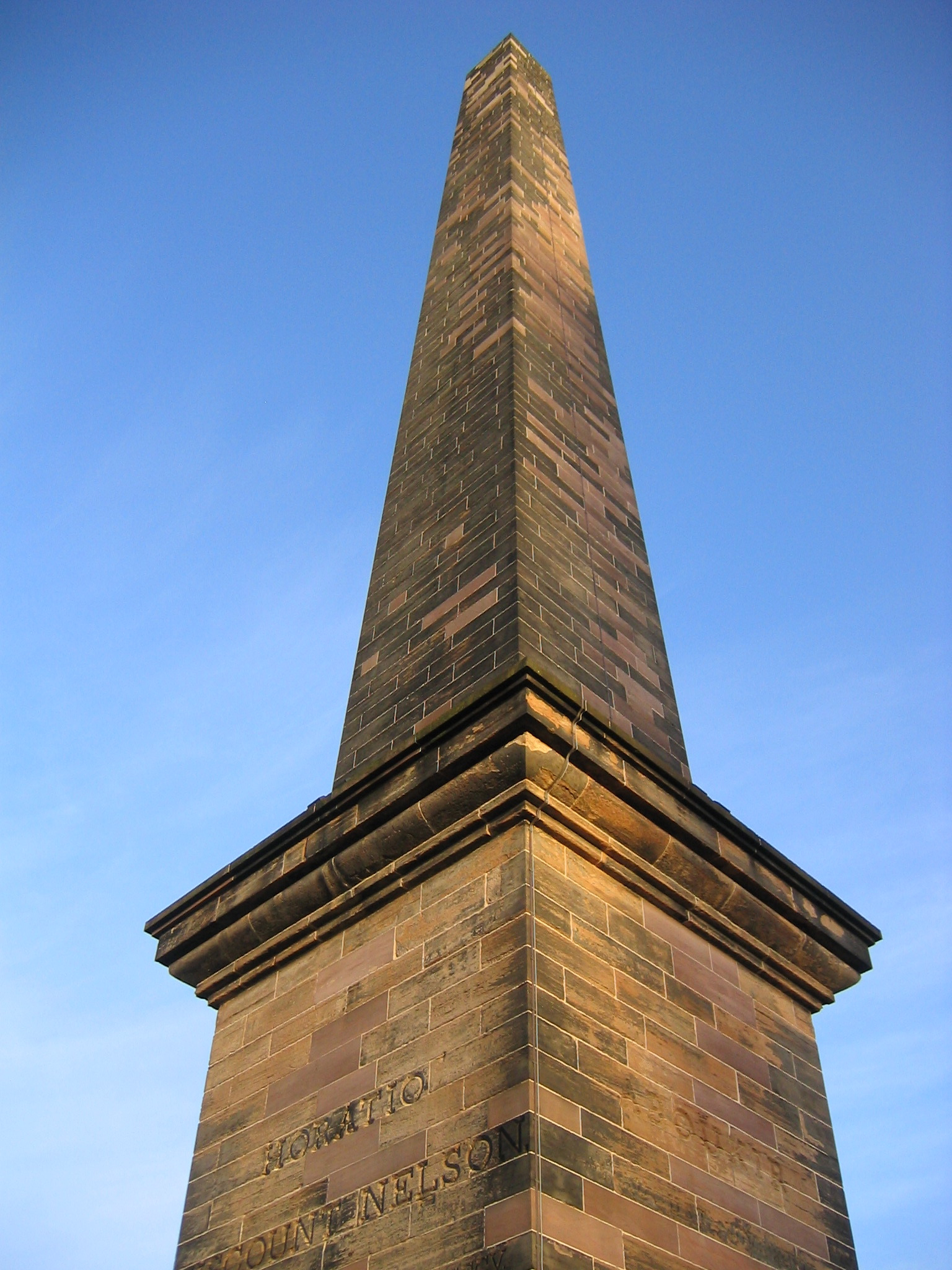
Close up of Monument at sunset

Soon after its construction, the obelisk was struck by lightning, leaving a long structural crack in the monument: this event was depicted in a painting by John Knox, which is now in the nearby People's Palace museum. In 1965 a tablet was added to the plinth commemorating James Watt's use of Glasgow Green while thinking about an improved steam engine.

The monument became a category A listed building in 1970.
