= Joseph Swan (engraver) =

British engraver and publisher (1796–1872)

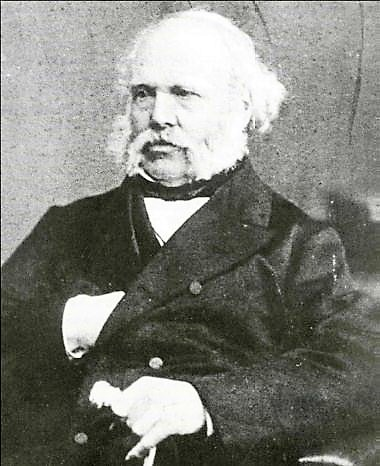

Joseph Swan (11 November 1796 Manchester, England – 22 September 1872 Anderston, Scotland) was an engraver and publisher active in Glasgow in the early nineteenth century.

== Life and work ==
Joseph Swan was born 11 November 1796 in Manchester England to Thomas Swan and Janet Russell.

He started his career in what had become his hometown of Edinburgh as an apprentice to engraver John Beugo and worked with other engravers. In August 1817, he married Margaret Thomson in Edinburgh before setting off to Glasgow. There, he took over the engraving business established by Charles Dearie, who died 28 November 1818.

Swan was one of a number of engravers and printers in Glasgow whose business encompassed pictures, portraits, maps, bookplates, plans, invoices, bills, bank notes, and silver work. One of his commissions was to illustrate rare plants in the collection of the Royal Botanic Institute of Glasgow.

Although best known for steel engraving work, the business also made much use of lithography, which it introduced in 1834. As the products were generally more ephemeral, such as printing images for notepaper and Swan’s Universal Copy Books, examples of lithographic work are less common. In 1836, Swan was one of the first to apply steam to the lithographic printing process. He employed staff who specialised in a particular area such as pictures, letter and seal engraving. They included Robert Charles Bell who, like Swan, had worked with John Beugo in Edinburgh and Thomas Annan, later known for his photographic work.

== Notable publications ==
Swan's reputation was established by his engraved illustrations of Scottish towns and landscapes which were based on pictures by contemporary Scottish artists such as John Fleming, John Knox, Andrew Donaldson, James Stewart and William Brown.

The first major work, Views of Scotland and its environs, appeared in 1826 with accompanying text by John Leighton and sold at five shillings and sixpence for fine proof impressions on India paper and four shillings and sixpence for common impressions.

To ensure the commercial success of such a project, subscribers were required to make payments in advance of publication to ensure that the work could proceed. Subscribers for the Views of Glasgow included the Duchess of Montrose, the Lord Provost of Glasgow and Archibald McLellan, a founder of the civic art collection. The engravings were made from pictures produced by Greenock-based John Fleming, Glasgow’s John Knox and Swan himself. The thirty-three plates include views of the city from different vantage points, the leading thoroughfares, buildings, and districts. Contemporary newspapers praised the work both for its choice of subjects and the quality of workmanship.

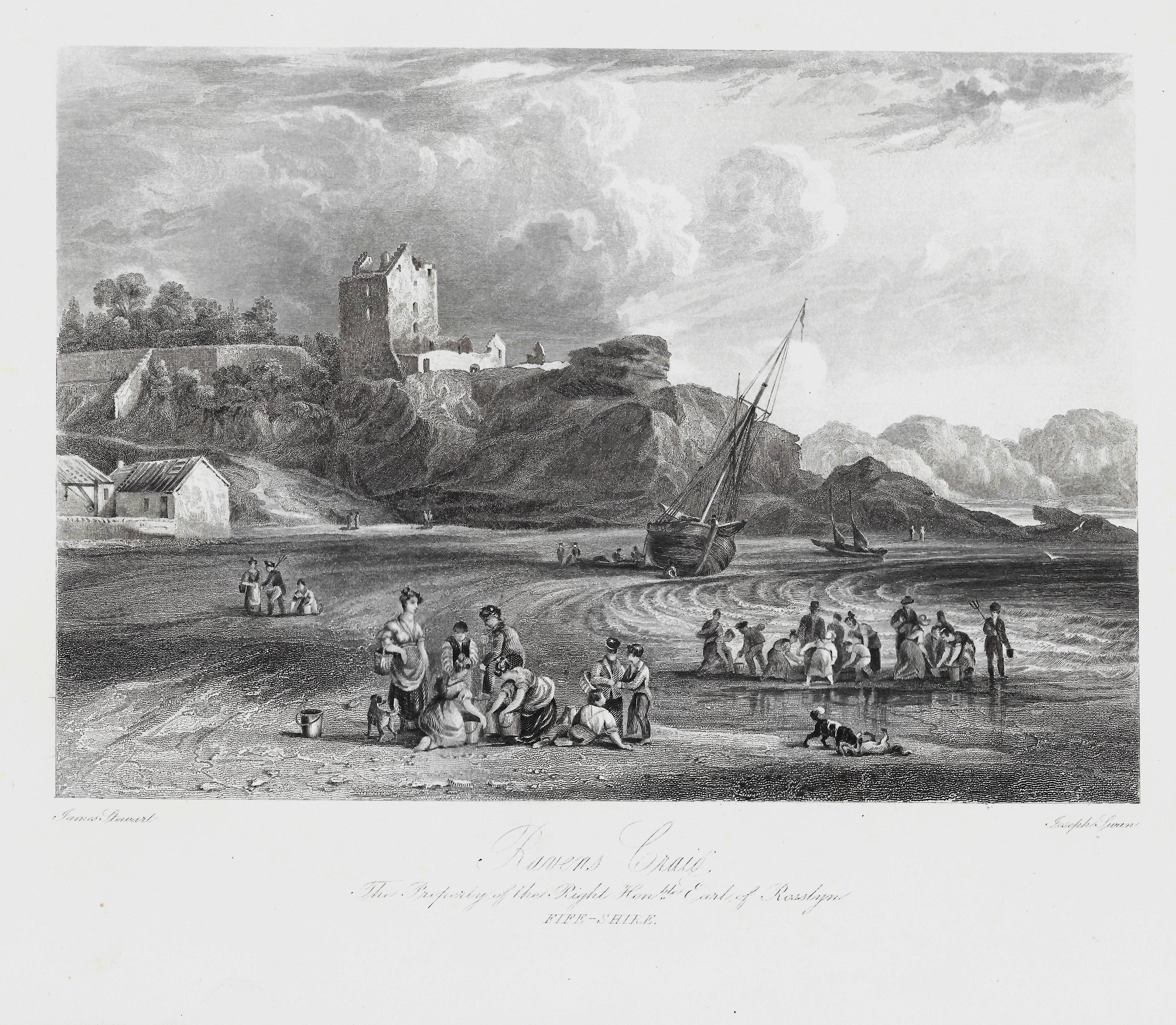
Ravenscraig Castle, from 'History of the County of Fife', a very typical steel engraving from one of Joseph Swan's publications.

Following the success of the Select Views of Glasgow and Its Environs, Swan published part one of the Select Views on the River Clyde in February 1828. The engravings for the series were taken from pictures by John Fleming and Andrew Donaldson. They were larger than the Glasgow set and the price rose accordingly. By February 1830 the series was complete and included views of country houses such as Blythswood, Carstairs, Erskine and Hamilton Place plus Helensburgh, Greenock, Rothesay, and Campbelltown.

Then followed Views of the Lakes of Scotland, the first part of which was published in 1830. Swan was keen to point out to potential subscribers and purchasers that the work was of national importance as it was the first to group together Highland and Lowland lochs and included many of the lesser-known ones. He attracted well over 1000 subscribers from throughout Britain. All the engravings were based on pictures by John Fleming and the text was by Leighton with an introduction by Professor Wilson. From 1832 to 1836 Swan’s entry in the Post Office Directory shows him as ‘engraver and publisher of the Lakes of Scotland’.

Two works by Charles Mackie, Historical Description of the Abbey and Town of Paisley (1835) and Historical Description of the Town of Dundee (1836), contain Swans engravings. The Paisley views were all based on Swan’s own artwork while the Dundee volume contains both his work and that of James Stewart. (NB This may be ‘James Stewart HFSA 1791–1863’. However, Stewart moved to London in 1830 and emigrated to South Africa in 1833. Other possibilities are 'Stewart, J.L. fl. 1830s–1840s, Edinburgh based landscape painter', also listed in the RSA Exhibitions list as 'Stewart, James L'. )

Stewart provided the artwork for the History of the County of Fife (1840). Sir William Hooker’s Perthshire Illustrated (1843), also has Swan’s engravings after Stewart, William Brown, Andrew Donaldson and D. MacKenzie. Swan’s engravings appear in further works including Strathclutha; or the Beauties of Clyde (1839), which combines views from the Glasgow and Clyde series; The Topographical, Statistical and Historical Gazetteer of Scotland (1845); and the new edition of James Browne’s A History of the Highlands and of the Highland Clans.

== Other activities ==
Joseph Swan was a committee member and for some time treasurer of the Glasgow Mechanics’ Institution which was founded in 1832. From January 1824, the institution published a very successful magazine which included many of his engravings such as portraits of James Watt and John Anderson, founder of Anderson’s institution, and the numerous mechanical inventions and improvements discussed in the text.

A key figure in Glasgow’s art world, Swan co-founded the Glasgow Dilettanti Society in 1825 to promote interest in the fine arts among the city’s artists, art collectors and connoisseurs. He was an honorary member of the West of Scotland Academy of the Fine Arts, founded in 1841, to which his firms supplied printed material. In the same year, he was on the management committee and treasurer of the newly founded Glasgow and West of Scotland Association for the Promotion of the Fine Arts, an art union.

Swan operated his business from a number of locations through his career. These included different addresses in the Trongate between 1818 and 1841 when he relocated to St Vincent Street, adjacent to the Western Club. Other premises were at Exchange Square, Bothwell Street, Buchannan Street, and Parliamentary Road where the renowned Swan’s Universal Copy Books were manufactured for use in schools worldwide. He was listed in the Post Office Directory as an engraver and lithographer into the 1860s.

== Family ==
He lived with his family at various locations in Glasgow between 1818 and his death in 1872. Some survive such as the villa at 114 Hill Street, Garnethill and 21 Sandyforth place, Sauchiehall Street, where he died 22 September 1872. His first wife with whom he had eight children, Margaret Thomson, died in 1836 and he later married Helen Gourlay Cumming with whom he had seven children.

He was buried at the Glasgow Necropolis where his monument stands. The monument is a valuable record of his family including nine of his children who predeceased him, though it does not include the names of four daughters who survived him. It also hints at his religious convictions and support for overseas missionary work.
