= Daniel Macnee =

Scottish portrait painter

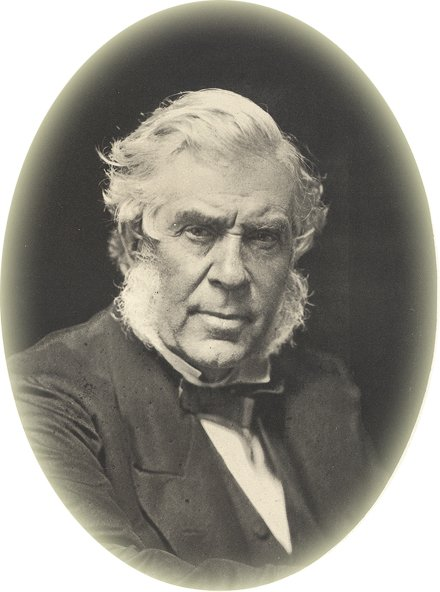

Sir Daniel Macnee FRSE PRSA LLD (4 June 1806, Fintry, Stirlingshire – 17 January 1882, Edinburgh), was a Scottish portrait painter who served as president of the Royal Scottish Academy (1876).

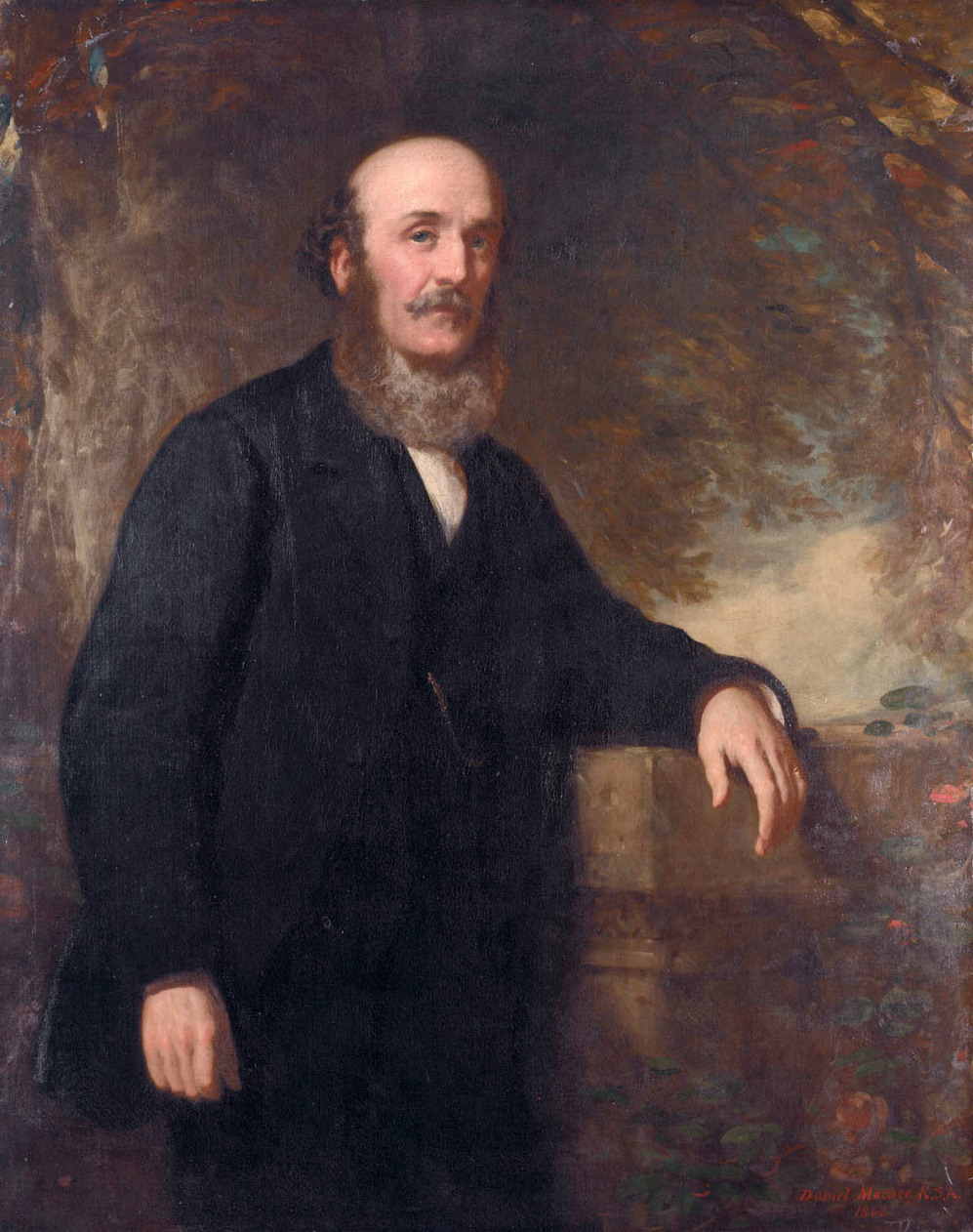
Peter Denny (1821–1895), 1868

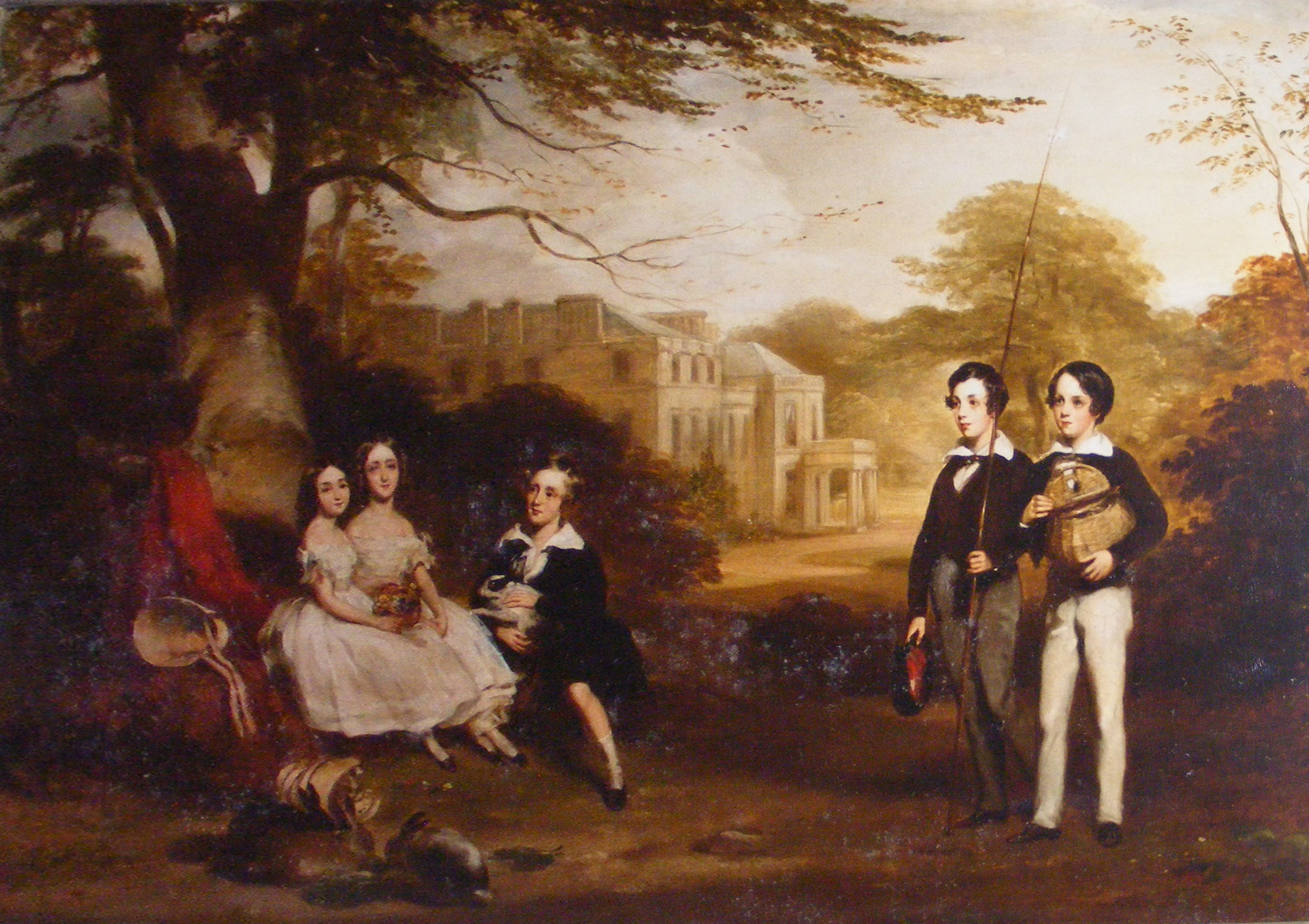
Janet Hamilton Campbell Conversation Pictures – children of Colin Campbell of Colgrain and Camis Eskan by Daniel Macnee, 1845

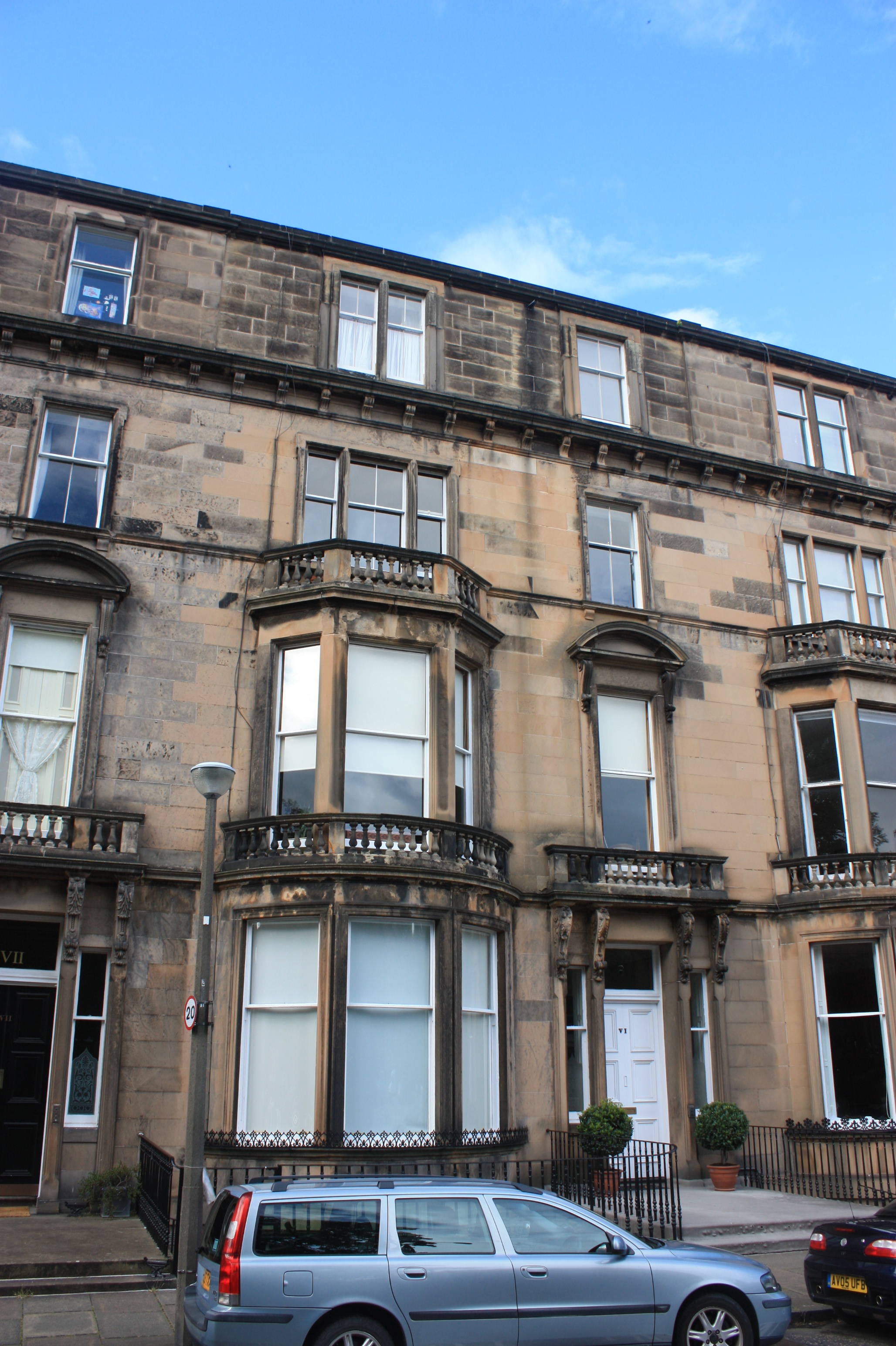
Macnee's large house at 6 Learmonth Terrace, Edinburgh

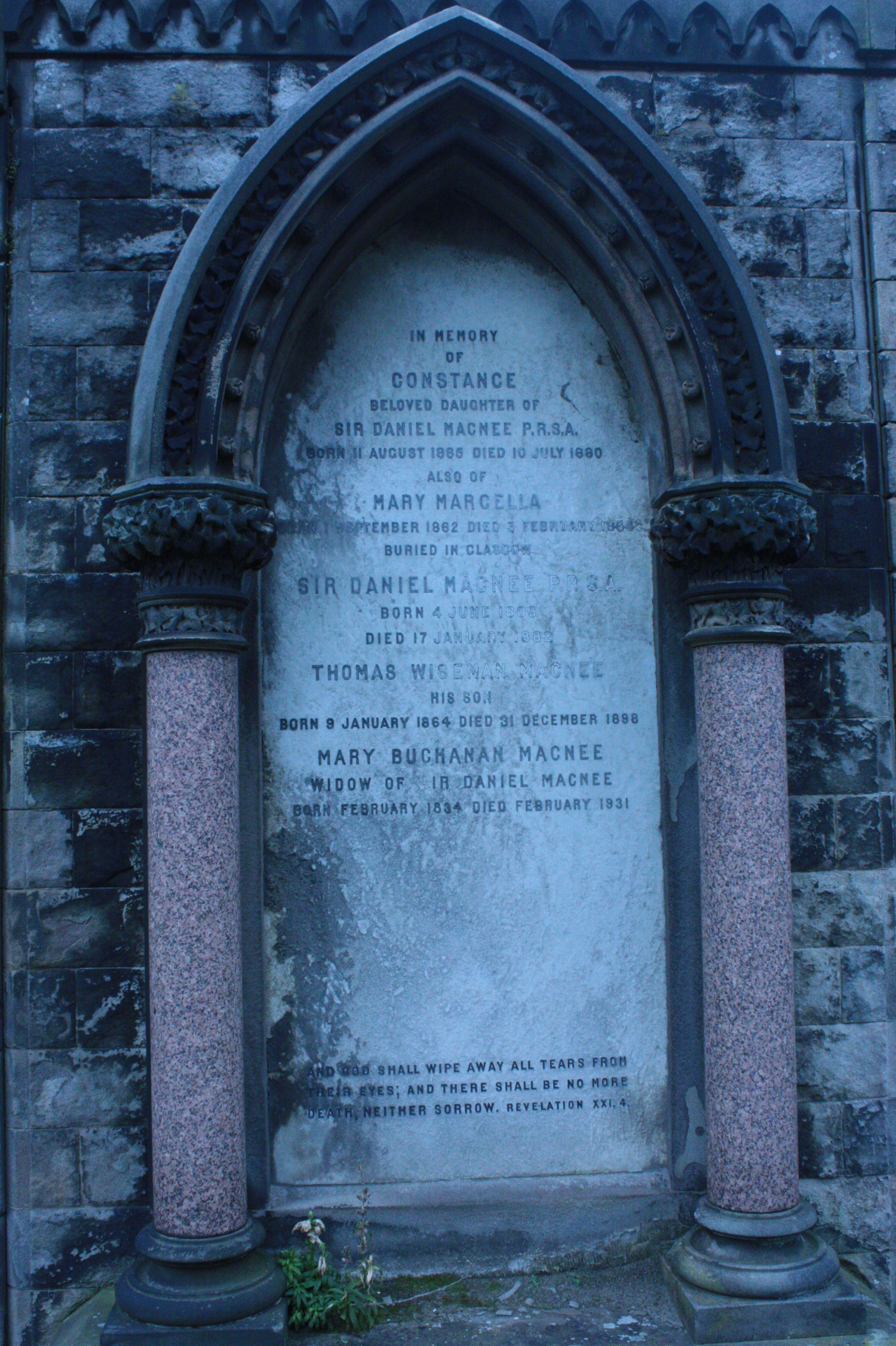
The grave of Daniel Macnee, Dean Cemetery

== Life ==
He was born at Fintry in Stirlingshire. At the age of thirteen he was apprenticed, alongside Horatio McCulloch and Leitch the water colourist, to the landscape artist John Knox. He afterwards worked for a year as a lithographer, and was employed by a company in Cumnock, Ayrshire (Smiths of Cumnock), to paint the ornamental lids of their sycamore-wood snuff-boxes.

He studied in Edinburgh at the Trustees' Academy, where he supported himself by illustrating publications for William Home Lizars the engraver. Moving to Glasgow, he established himself as a fashionable portrait painter. In 1829 he was admitted as a member of the Royal Scottish Academy. He does not appear as an independent property owner until 1840 when he is listed as a portrait painter living at 126 West Regent Street in Glasgow.

On the death of Sir George Harvey in 1876 he was elected President of the Royal Scottish Academy. From then until his death he remained in Edinburgh, where, according to the 1911 Encyclopædia Britannica, "his genial social qualities and his inimitable powers as a teller of humorous Scottish anecdotes rendered him popular". He lived at 6 Learmonth Terrace in Edinburgh's fashionable West End.

He was knighted by Queen Victoria in 1877. In the same year he was elected a Fellow of the Royal Society of Edinburgh. His proposers were Thomas Brumby Johnston, John Hutton Balfour, Sir Andrew Douglas Maclagan and Sir Charles Wyville Thomson.

Several of Macnee's works are held by the National Portrait Gallery in London and at the National Gallery of Scotland in Edinburgh. Kelvingrove Art Gallery and Museum was gifted the portrait of Robert, Henry and William Dunlop by Alastair Barr Dunlop and family in 2023.

Macnee is buried in Dean Cemetery in western Edinburgh with his wife Mary Buchanan, and children, Constance and Thomas Wiseman Macnee. They lie against the north wall of the northern extension.

== Family ==
He was first married to Margaret McGee (1810–1847) by whom he had at least seven children, including Horace Macnee CE. She is buried in Glasgow Necropolis.

He married, secondly, in 1859 at Blythswood, Glasgow, Mary Buchanan Macnee (1834–1931), 28 years his junior.

His daughter Isabella Wiseman was the subject of his masterpiece "Lady in Grey" (1859), which is held in the National Gallery of Scotland.

His great-grandson was the actor Patrick Macnee.

== Notable portraits ==
- James Jardine, Civil Engineer, Mathematician and Friend
- James Fillans, sculptor
- Horatio McCulloch, artist and friend
- Mrs George Kerr
- Mrs Catherine Blackie
- Alexander Morrison of Ballinakill
- Mrs Samuel Bough
- John Boyd Baxter
- John Ramsay McCulloch
- Thomas Duncan, artist and friend
- John Dykes, Provost
- Sir William Jackson MP
- Rev James Begg
- Peter Coats, thread magnate
- David Crawford
- Charles Randolph, shipbuilder
- James Stuart of Dunearn
- Robert Dalglish MP
- Dugald Moore
- Lady Macnee (his wife) with his children
- Arthur Perigal, artist and friend
- John Elder, shipbuilder
- Peter Denny
- Rev Robert Barclay
- David Hutcheson
- John Wilson, singer
- Robert Home
- Robert, Henry and William Dunlop
