= John Fleming (painter) =

Scottish landscape painter

John Fleming (1792-1845) was a Scottish landscape painter who lived and worked in Greenock. He is best known for the series of views he painted for Swan's Lakes of Scotland, published at Glasgow in 1834.

== Life ==
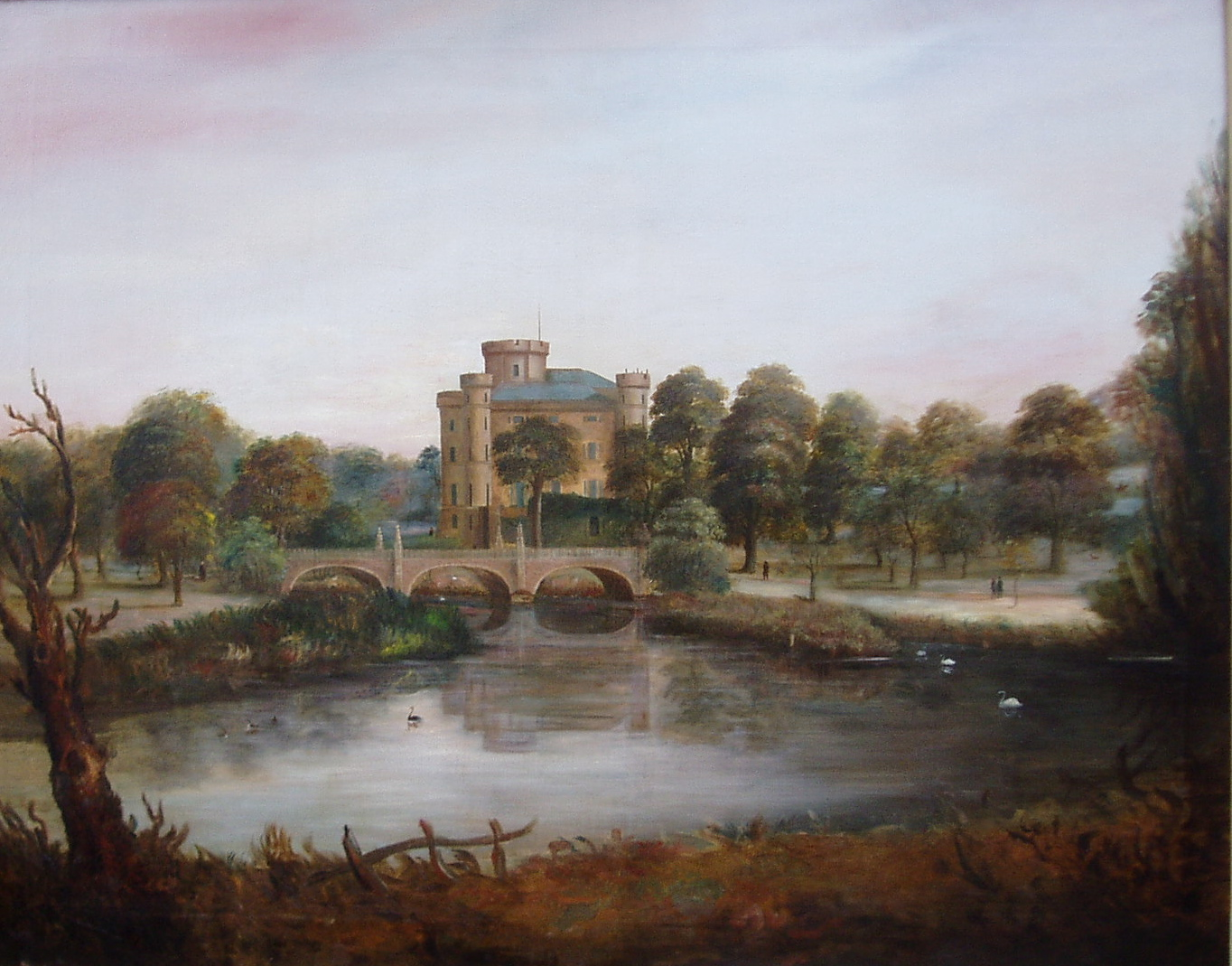
Eglinton Castle, 1830s

Fleming was born in about 1792 and apprenticed to a house painter at the age of fourteen. He is thought to have had some contact with the portrait painter James Saxon before spending some time in London, where he worked as a housepainter and took the opportunity to the study paintings in galleries there.

As a landscapist, Fleming specialised in small paintings of Scottish scenery, which became widely known through a series of collaborations with the Glasgow engraver and publisher Joseph Swan. He first worked with Swan in 1828 on a publication entitled Select Views of Glasgow and its environs, to which the Glasgow artist John Knox also contributed. Fleming and Swan followed this with Select Views on the Clyde (1830) and Select Views of the Lakes of Scotland (1834). The last of these, consisting of a total of 48 plates, issued in 16 parts, proved popular enough to justify the publication of further editions in 1836 and 1839.

Fleming also worked as a portrait painter and is listed as such in his first appearance in a local Greenock directory of 1831–2. From 1834 onwards he was listed as both a portrait and landscape painter. His portrait work seems to have been almost entirely commissioned by clients from within the town.

Fleming was a regular contributor to the Glasgow Exhibition of the Fine Arts series of the works of living British Artists, held under the patronage of the Glasgow Dilettanti Society between 1828 and 1838. He became an extraordinary member of the Glasgow Dilettanti Society and was elected a member of the West of Scotland Academy when he showed at its first exhibition in 1841. He also exhibited at the Royal Scottish Academy exhibitions of 1828, 1830 and 1837, showing two landscapes at each.

He died on 16 February 1845.
