= David Fleming =

David or Dave Fleming may refer to:

- David Fleming (politician) (1812–1890), American politician
- David Fleming (priest) (born 1937), Anglican priest
- David Fleming (writer) (1940–2010), English economist, cultural historian and environmental writer
- David Fleming, Lord Fleming (1877–1944), Scottish politician and judge
- David Fleming of Biggar (died 1406), Scottish noble
- David Hay Fleming (1849–1931), Scottish historian and antiquary
- David Thomas Fleming (1861–1938), member of the New Zealand Legislative Council
- David Fleming (composer), American composer
- Dave Fleming (baseball) (born 1969), American baseball pitcher
- Dave Fleming (Canadian football) (1944–2020), Canadian football player

== See also ==
- Dave Flemming (born 1976), American sportscaster
