= William Fleming =

William Fleming may refer to:

- William Fleming (MP) (c. 1475–1540), MP for Oxford
- William Fleming (priest) (1710–1742), Archdeacon of Carlisle
- William Fleming (governor) (1729–1795), soldier and physician who briefly served as governor of Virginia
  - William Fleming High School in Virginia, named after Governor Fleming
- William Fleming (judge) (1736–1824), Virginia jurist, delegate to the Continental Congress
- William B. Fleming (1803–1886), US Representative from Georgia
- William Fleming (Wisconsin politician) (1851–1933), Wisconsin State Assemblyman
- William H. Fleming (1856–1944), American politician and lawyer from Georgia
- William Fleming (lifeboatman) (1865–1954), Norfolk lifeboat coxswain
- William Fleming (Australian politician) (1874–1961)
- Billy Fleming (1871–1934), Scottish footballer
- Willie Fleming (footballer, born 1901) (fl. 1920s), Scottish footballer
- Launcelot Fleming (William Launcelot Scott Fleming, 1906–1990), Anglican bishop
- Bill Fleming (1913–2006), American MLB pitcher
- Willie Fleming (born 1939), Canadian football player
- William Fleming (Irish republican) (1965–1984), IRA member

== See also ==
- Bill Flemming (1926–2007), American television sports journalist
- Billy Fleming (born 1984), American landscape architect and activist
