= Thomas Fleming =

Thomas Fleming may refer to:

== Politicians and nobility ==
- Thomas Fleming, Earl of Wigtown (died c. 1382), second person to hold the title earl of Wigtown
- Thomas Fleming, 2nd Baron Slane (1358–1435), member of the Irish Parliament, 1394–1395
- Thomas Fleming, 10th Baron Slane (died 1598), member of the Irish parliament of 1585
- Thomas Fleming (died 1624) (1572–1624), English landowner and politician
- Thomas Willis Fleming (1819–1890), English landed proprietor and Conservative MP
- Tom Fleming (Irish politician) (born 1951), Independent Teachta Dála (TD) for Kerry South

== Sportspeople ==
- Tom Fleming (baseball) (1873–1957), 19th-century baseball player
- Tom Fleming (bowls), English lawn bower
- Tom Fleming (footballer) (1901–?), English football defender
- Tom Fleming (hurler) (1901–1960), Irish full-back hurler
- Tom Fleming (racing driver) (born 2002), English racing driver
- Tom Fleming (runner) (1951–2017), American runner
- Tommy Fleming (soccer) (1890–1965), Scottish American football (soccer) player

== Others ==
- Thomas Fleming (bishop) (1593–1665), Irish Franciscan and Roman Catholic Archbishop of Dublin
- Thomas Fleming (flourmiller) (1848–1930), New Zealand flourmiller
- Thomas Fleming (historian) (1927–2017), American historian and writer of historical fiction
- Sir Thomas Fleming (judge) (1544–1613), English judge
- Thomas Fleming (political writer) (born 1945), editor of Chronicles: A Magazine of American Culture
- Thomas C. Fleming (1907–2006), American journalist
- Tom Fleming (actor) (1927–2010), Scottish actor and BBC commentator
- Tom Fleming (artist) (born 1966), artist
- Tom Fleming, bass player of the English band Wild Beasts
- Tommy Fleming (musician) (born 1971), Irish singer

== See also ==
- Thomas Flemming (born 1967), East German swimmer
- Thomas Fleming House (disambiguation)
- Fleming (surname)
