= Robert Fleming =

Robert Fleming may refer to:

- Robert Fleming (author), American journalist and writer of mysteries, horror, and erotic fiction
- Robert Fleming (composer) (1921–1976), Canadian composer
- Robert Fleming (cricketer) (born 1953), English cricketer
- Robert Fleming (financier) (1845–1933), Scottish financier and founder of the merchant bank Robert Fleming & Co
- Robert Fleming (footballer) (1860–?), Scottish footballer
- Robert Fleming (New York politician), American politician, member of the New York State Assembly (1817–1818; 1834)
- Robert Fleming (Canadian politician) (1918–1985), Canadian politician in the Yukon
- Robert Fleming the elder (1630–1694), Scottish Calvinist minister and theologian
- Robert Fleming the younger (c. 1660–1716), Scottish Presbyterian minister, son of Robert Fleming the elder
- Robert Alexander Fleming (1862–1947), Scottish pathologist and medical author
- Robert D. Fleming (1903–1994), Pennsylvania politician
- Robert E. Fleming (born 1936), American literary critic and university professor
- Robert John Fleming (1907–1984), American soldier and governor of the Panama Canal Zone
- Robert John Fleming (Canadian politician) (1854–1925), mayor of Toronto, Canada
- Robert Loren Fleming (born 1956), American comic book writer
- Rob Fleming (born 1971), Canadian politician
- Bob Fleming, fictional character in the British comedy sketch show The Fast Show

== See also ==
- Robert Fleming & Co., an asset manager and merchant bank founded in Dundee, Scotland
- Robert Flemming (died 1483), dean of Lincoln
- Robert F. Flemming Jr. (1839–1919), American inventor and sailor
- Robert Fleming Gourlay (1778–1863), writer, reformer and agriculturalist
- Robert Fleming Rich, American politician
