= Katherine Fleming =

Catherine Fleming (or variants) may refer to:

== People ==
- Katherine Fleming (16th century), mother of Edward Butler, 1st Viscount Galmoye and daughter-heiress of Thomas Fleming, 10th Baron Slane
- Katherine Fleming (1870–1939), American singer and wife of conductor and composer Gustav Hinrichs
- Kate Fleming (1965–2006), American singer-actress
- Katherine Elizabeth Fleming (born 1965), American professor of Hellenic studies
- Kathy Fleming (born 1967), American middle distance runner
- Kate Fleming, sister of Lucy Fleming, and co-director of Ian Fleming Publications
- Catherine Fleming Bruce, American politician, author and preservationist

== Characters ==
- Detective Kate Fleming (DS, DI), a fictional character from BBC TV show Line of Duty

== See also ==
- Catherine Flemming (born 1967) German actress
- Katie Fleming Needham (1844–1927), daughter of teacher George Needham
- Fleming (disambiguation)
