= Haydn Fleming =

English footballer (born 1978)

Personal information
- Full name: Haydn Valentine Fleming
- Date of birth: 14 March 1978 (age 48)
- Place of birth: Islington, England
- Position: Defender

Youth career
- Queens Park Rangers

Senior career*
Years	Team	Apps	(Gls)
1995–1997	Cardiff City	32	(0)
1996	→ Inter CableTel (loan)	1	(0)
1997	Merthyr Tydfil		
1997–1999	Aberystwyth Town	49	(1)
2001–2004	Port Talbot Town	69	(2)
2004–2005	Llanelli	6	(0)
2005	Cwmbran Town	2	(0)
2005–2006	Dinas Powys		
2006	Taff's Well		
2006–2007	Carmarthen Town	16	(0)
- * Club domestic league appearances and goals

Haydn Valentine Fleming (born 14 March 1978) is an English former professional footballer. He made over 30 appearances in the Football League for Cardiff City and played for several clubs in the Welsh Premier League.

== Career ==
Fleming began his career as a youth player with Queens Park Rangers but was released by the club without making an appearance. He later joined Cardiff City and made his professional debut for the club in a 0–0 draw with Plymouth Argyle on 4 November 1995 and played 25 times in his debut season at Ninian Park. During the following season, he joined Welsh Premier League side Inter CableTel on loan but suffered a serious knee injury at the club and he returned to Cardiff where he was eventually released. He later went on to make over 100 appearances in the Welsh Premier League, most notably with Aberystwyth Town and Port Talbot Town.

== Personal life ==
Fleming also works as a personal trainer.
