= David Thomas Fleming =

New Zealand politician

David Thomas Fleming (1861–1938) was a member of the New Zealand Legislative Council from 7 May 1918 to 6 May 1925; then 7 May 1925 to 6 May 1932, when his term ended. He was appointed by the Reform Government.

He was from Balclutha.
