= Wendy Fleming =

New Zealand nurse and advocate for people living with dementia

Wendy Fleming CRSNZ is a New Zealand expert on Alzheimer’s disease and dementia. In 2018, she was made a Companion of the Royal Society Te Apārangi in recognition of her contributions to the promotion of dementia research in New Zealand.

== Life ==
Fleming has a background in nursing, specialising in aged care. From the 1970s to the 1990s, she was a member of several national nursing, hospital and aged care committees and advocated that people with dementia should have high-quality care based on world-class research. In 2004 she established the Alzheimer’s New Zealand Charitable Trust, and has held the positions of chair of Alzheimer’s New Zealand and honorary vice-president of Alzheimer's Disease International. Fleming is a member of the Advisory Board for the Centre for Brain Research at the University of Auckland.
