= John Arnold Fleming =

John Arnold Fleming FRSE OBE JP (1871 – 22 October 1966) was a Scottish industrial chemist closely associated with the British pottery industry. He was also a noted journalist, author, politician, and philanthropist. He was a keen amateur falconer and golfer. As an author he standardly appears as J. Arnold Fleming.

A proficient potter he ran potteries at an industrial level and was long associated with the Britannia Pottery in St Rollox in Glasgow, which he owned and controlled following his father’s death, plus other Staffordshire Potteries. A substantial part of the ceramics collection within Glasgow Museums was gifted by Fleming.

== Life ==
He was the eldest son of Sir James Fleming of Woodburn House in Rutherglen. He was educated at the Albany Academy in Glasgow then went to the Glasgow School of Art, specialising in modelling. He then went to the University of Edinburgh to study chemistry. He met John Logie Baird early in his life and they were lifelong friends. He donated a statue of Logie Baird to the town of Helensburgh and also created the John Logie Baird Memorial Prize at the local school.

He was elected a Fellow of the Royal Society of Edinburgh in 1911. His proposers were James Readman, Robert Tatlock, John Glaister, John James Burnet and Sir Robert Rowand Anderson.

In 1922 general election he unsuccessfully stood as the Liberal candidate for the St Rollox constituency in Glasgow. In 1923 he sold the Britannia Pottery due to a slump in domestic ceramic sales. He then became a member both of Helensburgh Town Council and Dunbartonshire County Council. He held the rank of Baillie and donated a set of bells to the town hall clock. In 1965 he is also recorded as having paid a substantial proportion of the cost of the new clubhouse at Helensburgh Golf Club.

He died on 22 October 1966 at his home, Locksley on East Abercromby Street in Helensburgh.

== Family ==
In 1914 he married Wilhelmina Reid, daughter of William Brand of Glasgow. They had no children.

== Publications ==
- Scottish Pottery (1923) (reprinted 1973)
- Flemish Influence in Britain (1930)
- Modern Glass (1931) co-written with Guilluame Janneau
- Scottish and Jacobite Glass (1938)
- Living History in Glasgow (1942)
- The Gareloch – Ancient and Modern (1947) Scotland
- Huguenot Influence in Scotland (1953) - McLellan
- Helensburgh and the Three Lochs (1957)
- Mary Guise (1960)

== Positions of note ==
See

- President of the Royal Glasgow Institute of Fine Arts
- Fellow of the Chemical Society of London
- Fellow of the Royal Society of Edinburgh
- Chairman of the Royal Scottish Academy of Music
- Vice President of the Scottish Artists Benevolent Association
- Member of UNESCO
- British Representative at the Ceramic Museum of Faenza in Italy
- Church elder at St Bride’s Church, Helensburgh
- Honorary President of the Helensburgh and District Horticultural Association
- Co-founder of the Pottery Industrial Council
