= Klas Fleming =

Klas Fleming may refer to:

- Klaus Fleming (Clas Eriksson Fleming 1535–1597), Finnish-Swedish admiral
- Klaus Hermansson Fleming (c. 1550–1616), Swedish soldier and historian
- Klaus Hermansson Fleming (official) (1649–1685), Governor of Örebro (1680–1681)
- Claes Adolph Fleming (1771–1831), Swedish count and member of the Swedish Academy
- Clas Larsson Fleming (1592–1644), admiral and administrator of the Royal Swedish Navy
- HSwMS Clas Fleming, a Swedish Navy mine cruiser

== See also ==
- Fleming of Louhisaari, about the family
