= Erik Fleming =

Erik or Eric Fleming may refer to:

- Erik Fleming (councilor) (1487–1548), Councilor of State of Sweden
- Erik Fleming (director), film director who directed My Brother the Pig
- Eric Fleming (footballer) (1903–1984), Australian rules footballer
- Erik Fleming (silversmith) (1894–1954), Swedish silversmith, court artisan, teacher
- Eric Fleming (1925–1966), American actor
- Erik R. Fleming (born 1965), Mississippi politician
