= Mick Fleming (pastor) =

English pastor (born 1966)

Michael Fleming (born 1966), known as Pastor Mick, is an English Christian pastor. He fell into drug addiction after suffering rape and the death of his sister in consecutive days at age 11, and became a drug dealer and debt collector. In 2009, he was taken to a psychiatric hospital after attempting suicide when unable to attack a debtor.

After leaving the hospital, Fleming quit drugs and crime, and studied for a theology degree from the University of Manchester. He provided food and clothes to the needy of Burnley during the COVID-19 pandemic, and was featured on a BBC News documentary. He has written two autobiographies, in 2022 and 2025; the foreword to the first was written by Prince William.

== Early life and criminal career ==
Fleming was born in Burnley in Lancashire. His father was a window cleaner who raised the family strictly and forced the family to go to church. In February 1977, Fleming was raped by a stranger on the way to school. The following day, as he was about to disclose the rape to his parents, his father informed him that his 20-year-old sister had died of a heart attack.

Fleming turned to alcohol and other drugs to manage his grief, and began dealing drugs from age 14, later becoming a debt collector for other criminals. He was married and had three children during his criminal career, but they were taken into his mother's care.

In 2009, Fleming was sent to collect debt from a man, but was unable to when he saw the man's two young daughters; he said that a blinding light came from a child. He began vomiting blood and then attempted suicide by firearm, but his gun did not fire. Fleming was sectioned under the Mental Health Act and taken to a psychiatric hospital, where he began praying with a pastor and committed to turning his life around.

One year into his sobriety, Fleming saw his rapist in McDonald's, and returned the next day with a knife to kill him. He instead sat and talked with the man, and later reflected "People say resentment is like drinking poison and expecting the other person to die. That's what I'd been doing". Fleming tried to help his rapist with alcoholism, and never disclosed who he was.

== Pastoral work ==
After meeting a tutor from the University of Manchester, Fleming began a degree in theology, having previously struggled at school. He was diagnosed with dyslexia and dyspraxia and graduated with a 2:1 degree. In 2019, he was ordained a bishop of the International Christian Church Network, at a ceremony attended by Member of Parliament Andrew Stephenson and the mayors of Burnley and Pendle.

During the COVID-19 pandemic, Fleming and his Church on the Street Ministries provided food and clothes to the needy in his hometown, one of the most deprived in England. Two weeks after being featured on a BBC News documentary, he had raised £250,000.

In 2022, Fleming's charity was visited by Prince William and Princess Catherine, who had seen the news feature on it. Prince William wrote the foreword to Fleming's autobiography Blown Away: From Drug Dealer to Life Bringer, which was released later that year; Fleming was surprised by the endorsement and said "It shows the measure of the man and that he isn’t afraid to align himself with somebody who has a dubious past". In September 2022, it was announced that Fleming's life story was to be made into a drama series, written by Andrew Knott and William Ash.

In 2025, Fleming's second book was released. Titled Walk in My Shoes: Stories of Miraculous Transformation, it documented the lives of people he had met.

Fleming announced in August 2025 that he had given up his home and possessions to live in a second-hand motorhome. He said that it was in order to take his church "literally to the streets" and reach more people. He said that he was warned by police later that year that the message on the back of his motorhome – John 3:16 – "could be seen as hate speech in the wrong context".
