= Harold Fleming =

Harold Fleming may refer to:

- Harold Fleming (footballer) (1887–1955), English football player
- Harold C. Fleming (1926–2015), anthropologist and historical linguist

== See also ==
- Harry Raymond Fleming, Saskatchewan physician and politician
- Harold Fleming Snead (1903–1987), judge
