= John Fleming (dean of Ross) =

John Robert William Fleming was Dean of Ross from 1978 to 1968.

Fleming was born in 1907 and educated at Trinity College, Dublin; and ordained in 1918. After a curacy in Multyfarnham and Old Leighlin he was headmaster of Bishop Foy's School, Waterford from 1944 to 1952. He held incumbencies at Aghold (1952–56), Chilvers Coton (1956–59) and Castlemartyr (1959–78). He was also Chancellor of Cork Cathedral.
