= Robert Fleming (cricketer) =

English cricketer

Personal information
- Full name: Robert Christopher John Fleming
- Born: 20 July 1953 (age 73); Woking, Surrey, England
- Batting: Right-handed
- Bowling: Right-arm off break

Domestic team information
- Years: Team
- 1974: Cambridge University

Career statistics
Competition	First-class	List A
Matches	9	2
Runs scored	60	2
Batting average	7.50	–
100s/50s	–/–	–/–
Top score	13*	2*
Balls bowled	774	132
Wickets	7	1
Bowling average	74.57	110.00
5 wickets in innings	–	–
10 wickets in match	–	–
Best bowling	3/91	1/39
Catches/stumpings	5/–	–/–
- Source: Cricinfo, 15 January 2022

Robert Christopher John Fleming (born 20 July 1953) is an English former first-class cricketer.

Fleming was born at Woking in July 1953 and later studied at Jesus College, Cambridge. While studying at Cambridge, he played first-class cricket for Cambridge University Cricket Club in 1974, making nine appearances. Playing as an off break bowler in the Cambridge side, he took 7 wickets at an average of 74.57, with best figures of 3 for 91. As a tailend batsman, he scored 60 runs with a highest score of 13 not out. He also made two appearances in List A one-day cricket for Cambridge in the 1974 Benson & Hedges Cup against Surrey at The Oval and Sussex at Hove. He took one wicket in these matches, that of Surrey's Mike Edwards.

Fleming later ran his own business in the travel industry, specialising in Christian Mediterranean cruises. In April 2016, he was found guilty of fraud at Kingston upon Thames Crown Court, after defrauding customers out of £26,000 meant for a cruise he was to book for them, but instead invested the money into a Turkish hotel. He was handed an 18-month jail sentence, suspended for two years, and fined £15,000.
