= James Fleming (lawyer) =

Sir James Fleming JP (3 August 1831 – 24 May 1914) was a Scottish lawyer.

Fleming was born in Rutherglen, Scotland, on 3 August 1831, and educated there in the parish school.

He was chairman of the Glasgow School of Art for 28 years. There was a memorial plaque with his image there, created by Charles Rennie Mackintosh, but it was destroyed in the 2018 fire.

He was knighted in 1906.He was president of the Glasgow Liberal Club.

He was married to Mary Smellie, who died 5 April 1891, aged 49 years. Their son, Captain James Hamilton Fleming, was killed in Action on 13 October 1915 at the Hohenzollern Redoubt. Another son, John Arnold Fleming, (1871–1966) was an industrial chemist.

Fleming died on 24 May 1914 and was buried at Rutherglen Cemetery in Glasgow.
