= Donald Fleming (disambiguation) =

Donald Fleming may refer to:

- Donald Fleming (1905–1986), Canadian parliamentarian
- Donald Fleming (chemist) (born 1938), Canadian chemist
- Donald Fleming (historian) (1923–2008), American historian
