= Willie Fleming (footballer, born 1901) =

Scottish footballer

Personal information
- Full name: William Fleming
- Date of birth: 30 April 1901
- Place of birth: Alexandria, Scotland
- Positions: Centre forward; defender

Senior career*
Years	Team	Apps	(Gls)
–	Duntocher Hibernian		
1922–1924	Vale of Leven	60	(5)
1924–1925	Celtic	19	(10)
1925–1934	Ayr United	284	(25)
1934–1935	Dundee United	30	(0)
Total		393	(40)
- * Club domestic league appearances and goals

William Fleming (born 30 April 1901) was a Scottish footballer who played for Vale of Leven, Celtic, Ayr United and Dundee United.

Born in Alexandria, his career path was unconventional in that he began his Scottish Football League career at local club Vale of Leven as a centre half, was converted to a centre forward role in his one season at Celtic (where he scored four goals in his debut but deputised for Jimmy McGrory and Patsy Gallacher and was not involved in their 1925 Scottish Cup Final victory), continued up front in his first season at second-tier Ayr United where his goal return was a respectable 20 in 30 appearances, but then switched back to a defensive role, where he stayed for eight more years at Ayr – which featured a promotion to the top tier as winners of 1927–28 Scottish Division Two followed by a sustained spell in the highest division – and in his final season with Dundee United back in the lower tier.
