= Greg Fleming =

Greg Fleming may refer to:

- Greg Fleming (businessman) (born 1963), American business executive and investment banker
- Greg Fleming (footballer) (born 1986), Scottish goalkeeper
- Greg Fleming (politician) (born 1970 or 1971), New Zealand member of parliament
- Greg Fleming (rugby league) (born 1973), Australian rugby league footballer
