= Glasgow Green =

Park in Glasgow, Scotland

- Grian Glaschu (Scottish Gaelic); Glesga Green (Scots)
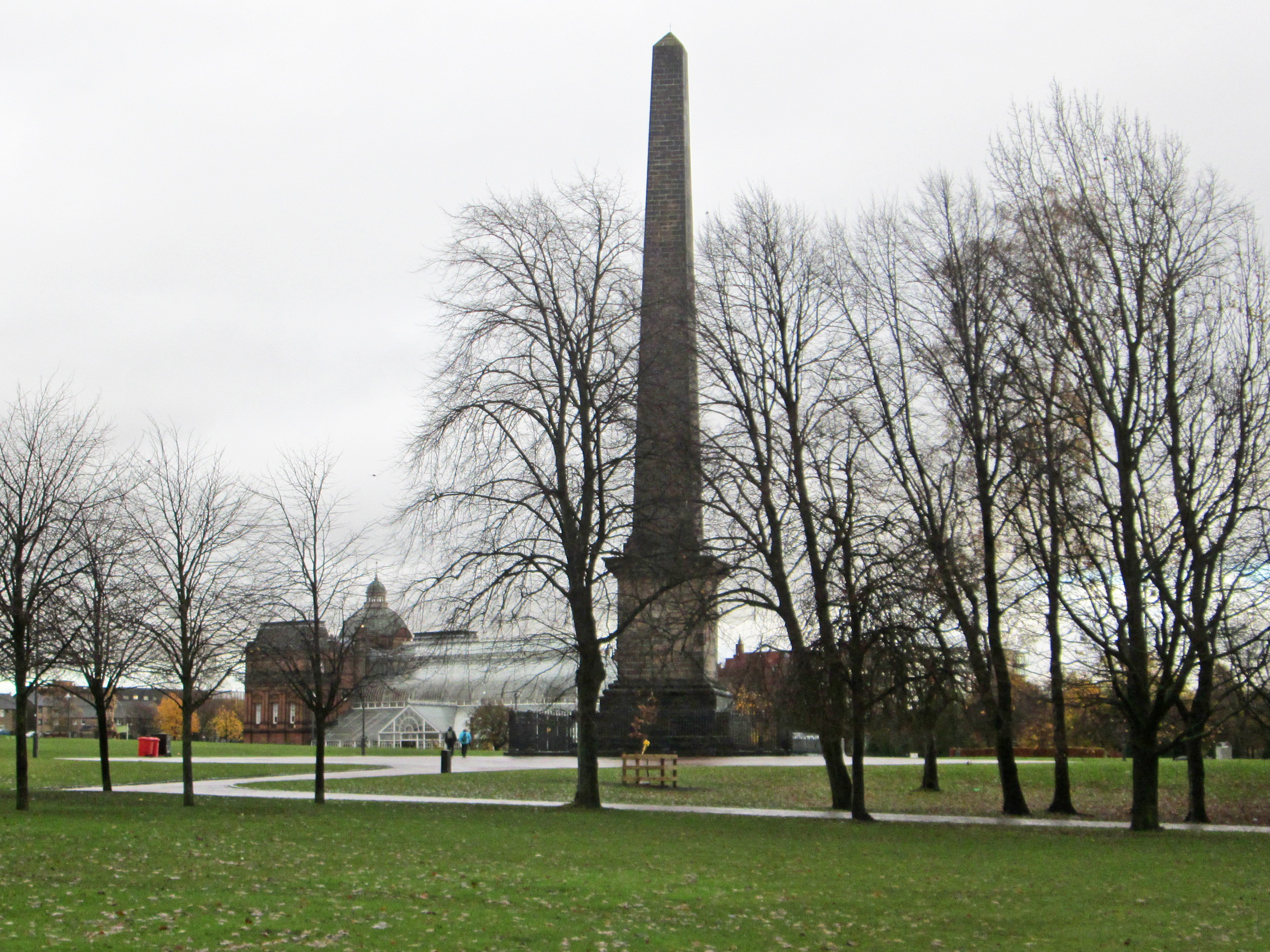
- The Nelson Monument on Glasgow Green, with the People's Palace in the background
- Interactive map of Glasgow Green
- Type: Public park
- Location: Glasgow, Scotland
- OS grid: NS6017363990
- Coordinates: 55°50′56″N 4°14′07″W
- Area: 55 hectares (136 acres)
- Operator: Glasgow City Council
- Awards: Green Flag Award (2011)

Glasgow Green is a park in the east end of Glasgow, Scotland, on the north bank of the River Clyde. Established in the 15th century, it is the oldest park in the city. It connects to the south via the St Andrew's Suspension Bridge.

== History ==
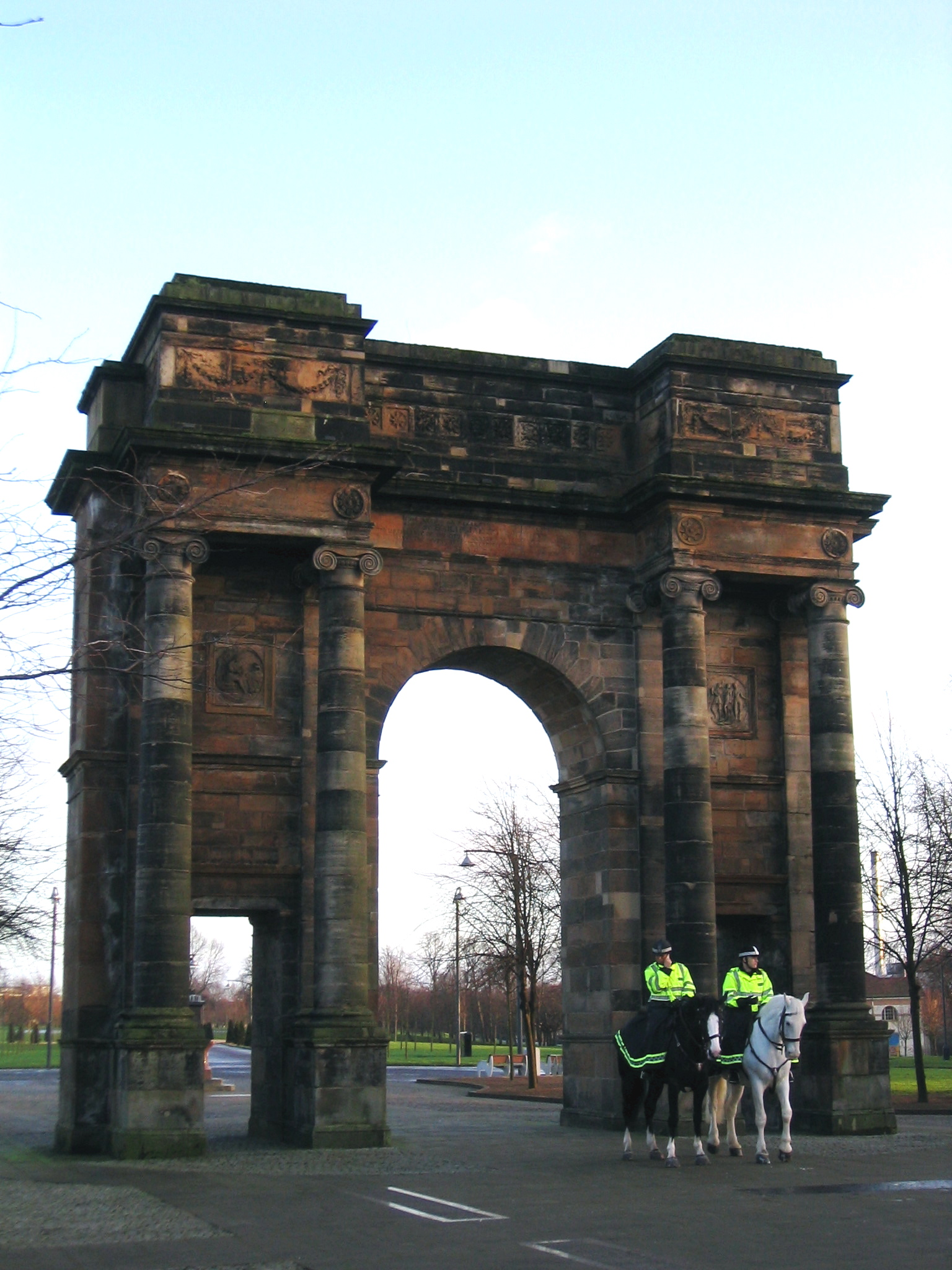
McLennan Arch, found at the north-west entrance to Glasgow Green.

In 1450, King James II granted the parkland to Bishop William Turnbull and the people of Glasgow. The Green then looked quite different from the Green today. It was an uneven, swampy area made up of several distinct "greens" (separated by the Camlachie and Molendinar Burns): the High Green; the Low Green; the Calton Green; and the Gallowgate Green. In the centuries that followed, the parkland was used for grazing, washing and bleaching linen, drying fishing nets, and recreational activities like swimming. In 1732, Glasgow's first steamie, called the Washhouse, opened on the banks of the Camlachie Burn.

From 25 December 1745 to 3 January 1746, Bonnie Prince Charlie's army camped in Flesher's Haugh (privately owned at the time, but would become part of Glasgow Green in 1792); Charlie demanded that the town supply his army with fresh clothing and footwear.

In 1765, the Green was the site where inventor James Watt was strolling, when he hit upon the idea of the separate condenser for the steam engine.

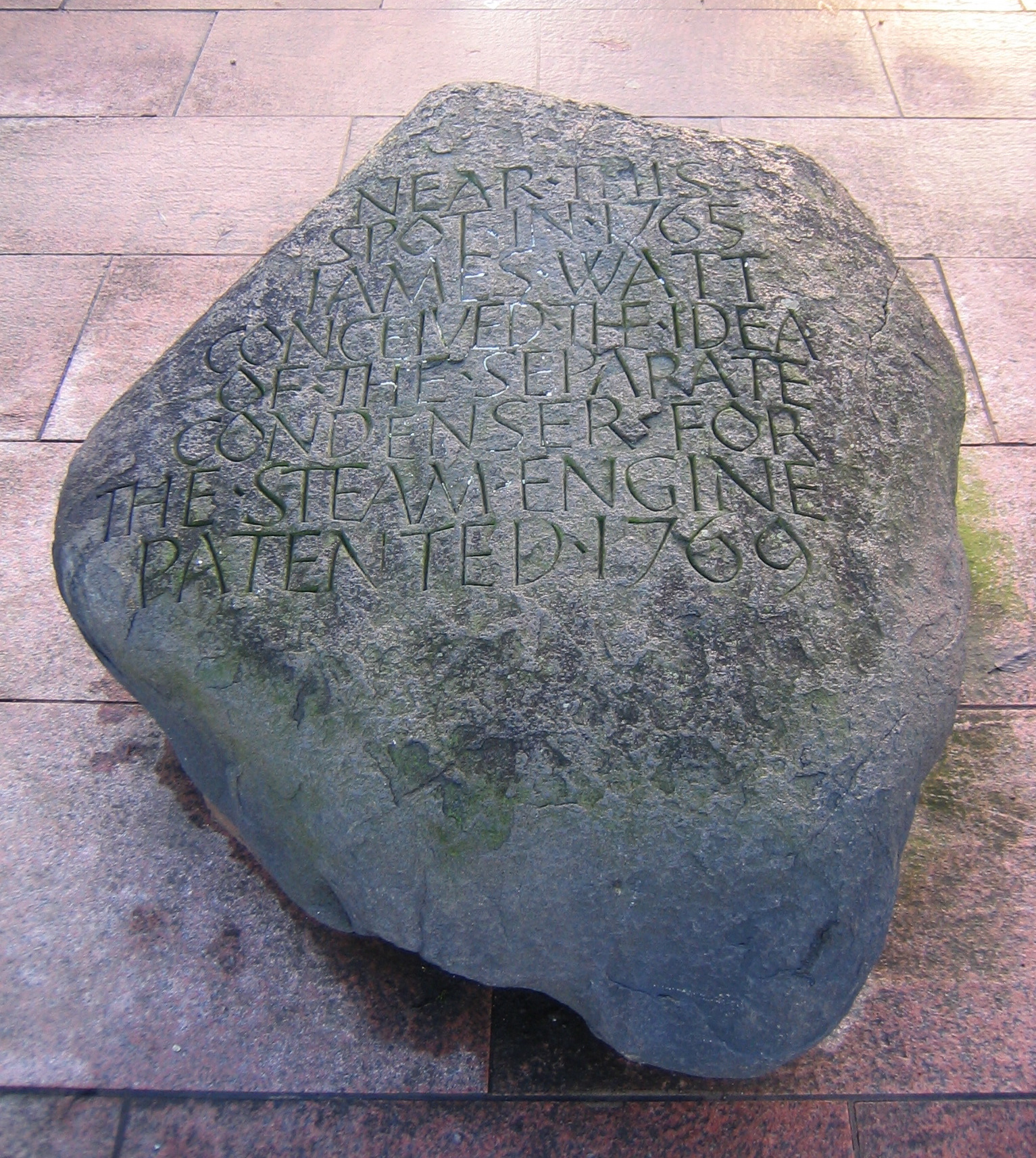
Stone commemorating James Watt's inspiration.

In 1792, Glasgow extended the parkland to the east by purchasing an additional stretch of land, known as Fleshers' Haugh from Patrick Bell of Cowcaddens.

=== 19th century ===
In the 19th century, two projects were proposed that would have intruded upon the green. The steamship owner Henry Bell wanted a canal built from the Broomielaw to Glasgow Green with a quay terminal at the green. This proposal was unpopular and was never implemented. Then, in 1821 and 1822, exploratory boring underneath the green uncovered large coal deposits, after which the city's Superintendent of Work recommended a mining operation to extract to coal. At the time, the Glasgow Town Council voted against the plan. It was re-introduced in 1858, and this time the town council approved it, because they were looking for ways to offset the cost of purchasing land to create parks in other areas of the town. But their decision was met with such large-scale public opposition that the plan was dropped. The proposal was reintroduced twice more, in 1869 and 1888, but was rejected both times.

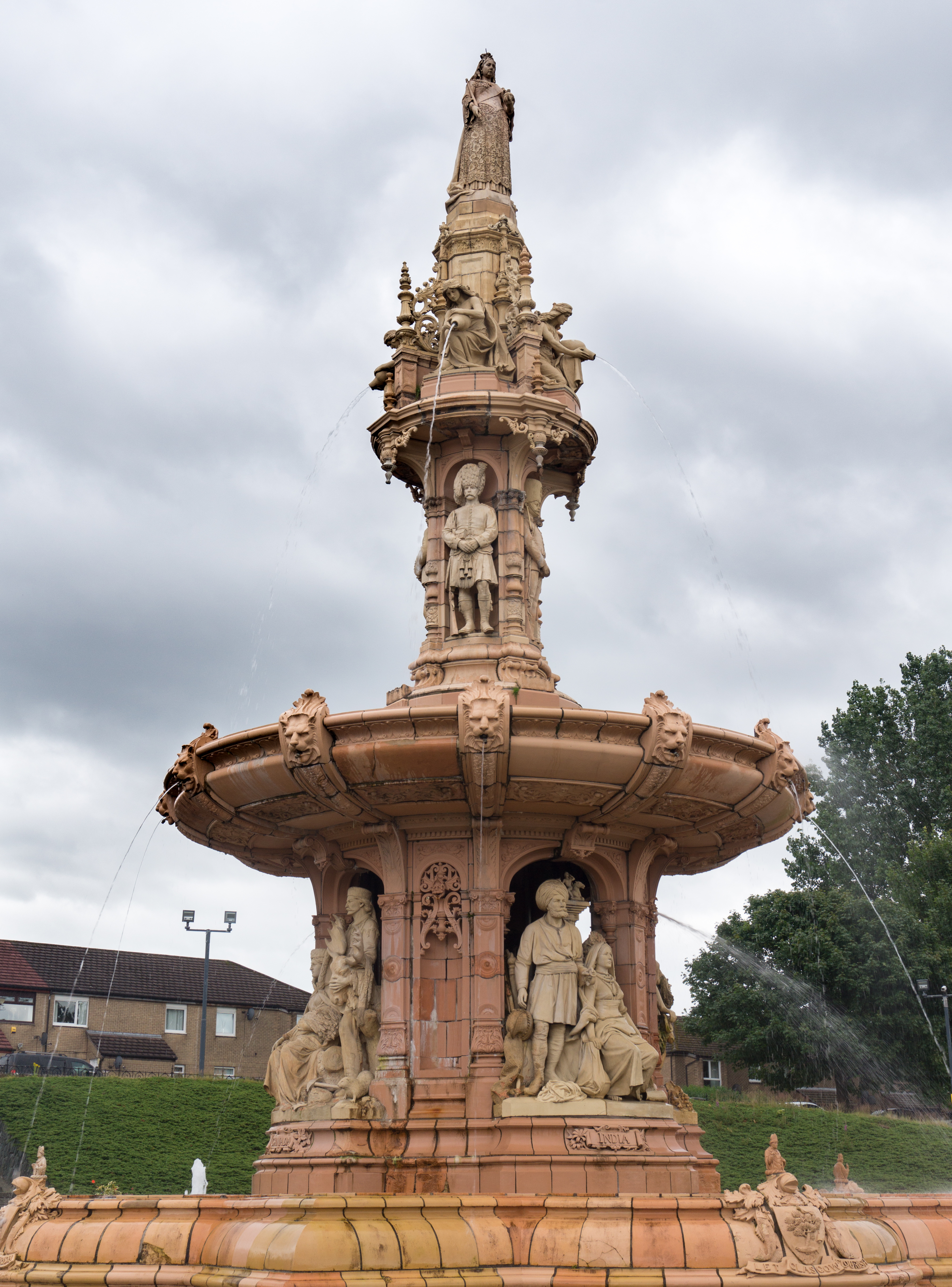
The Doulton Fountain

When the Napoleonic Wars ended in 1815, there was an economic depression, and many people were unemployed. In response, Glasgow Town Council hired 324 jobless workers to remodel Glasgow Green. In 1817 and 1826, efforts were made to improve the layout of the park. Culverts were built over the Calmachie and Molendinar Burns and the park was levelled out and drained.

Meanwhile, the green became the locus of much political activity. The Radical movement for parliamentary reform was growing, and in 1816, about 40,000 people attended a meeting on the green to support demands for a more representative government and an end to the Corn Laws that kept food prices high.

Then, in the spring of 1820, the green became one of the meeting places for conspirators in what was known as the "Radical War". Strikers carried out military drills on the green before their brief rebellion was crushed. Later, James Wilson was convicted of treason for allegedly being a leader of the insurrection. He was hanged and beheaded on the green in front of a crowd of about 20,000 people.

When Parliament passed the Reform Act 1832, increasing the electorate from 4,329 (in 1820) to 65,000 (in 1832), over 70,000 people gathered on the green for a demonstration, and a band from the Bridgeton area of Glasgow les a procession lead around the green.

The Chartism movement that grew in response to the Reform Act 1832 eventually resulted in what is known as the Chartist Riot of 1848. William Ewart Gladstone's Reform Act 1867, which increased the electorate to 230,606 (in 1868), inspired further demonstrations and meetings on the green.

In April 1872, the "women's suffragette society", that had formed two years earlier, held a large open-air meeting on the green. From then on, until the late 1910s, the women's suffrage movement continued to use the green as a meeting place.

The green was also used for sport during the 19th century, notably by two of Scotland's oldest sporting clubs: The Clydesdale Amateur Rowing Club was established in 1857 on the south side of the River Clyde (it moved to Glasgow Green in 1901); the Glasgow University Rowing Club (now known as the Glasgow University Boat Club) was established in 1867 at the Green, on the banks of the River Clyde. In May 1872, a group of members from the Clydesdale Amateur Rowing Club formed a football team and began playing against Callander Football Club, using Flesher's Haugh on the green as their playing field. This team was later renamed Rangers Football Club.

Glasgow Green railway station opened on the Glasgow Central Railway line in 1895. (It was temporarily closed during World War I, and permanently closed in 1953.)

=== 20th century ===
In the early years of the 20th century, the green continued to be a favored venue for political protests. During World War I, members of the anti-war movement held mass demonstrations on the Green. In September 1914, the revolutionary socialist leader John Maclean held his first anti-war rally there, under Nelson's monument. The Military Service Act 1916 (5 & 6 Geo. 5. c. 104) inspired a rally on the green that led to its three lead speakers being imprisoned for 12 months for violations of the Defence of the Realm Act 1914 (4 & 5 Geo. 5. c. 29). On 29 June 1916, David Lloyd George was invited to receive the Freedom of the City honour, which sparked mass protests on the green. In May 1917, a number of workers marched through Glasgow to the green in support of Russia's February Revolution. World War I also saw an influx of munitions workers into Glasgow. The growing population led to rent increases, which inspired protests on the green in 1920.

In more recent times, the green has been a favorite spot for many live music events. Michael Jackson performed there on 18 August 1992 during his Dangerous World Tour in front of 65,000 people; it was the only live show he did in Scotland. In 1990, the Stone Roses performed at the green. The band later split up, but came back together for a world tour, after which they returned to the green on 15 June 2013 and gave another live performance.

=== 21st century ===
In 2004, the Green was host to the Download Festival Scotland, a live music festival featuring Metallica, Linkin Park, Korn, and Slipknot. In May 2014, the Green was the site of Radio 1's Big Weekend, the biggest free ticketed music event in Europe. The event featured some of the biggest acts in the world, and they performed to a total of over 50,000 spectators in the course of the weekend.

As part of the legacy of the 2014 Commonwealth Games, the Green became one of 27 sites in Glasgow to be protected by Fields in Trust through a legal "Minute of Agreement". The agreement aims to ensure that the Green will be preserved as public recreation land for future generations to enjoy.

Since 2017, the Green has served as the venue for the music festival TRNSMT.

The Green is also currently the home of the World Pipe Band Championships.

The Green continues to host sporting events in addition to music events. The annual Great Scottish Run, which is generally held in early October, finishes up on the Green, with runners entering it through the historic McLennan Arch.

== Landmarks ==
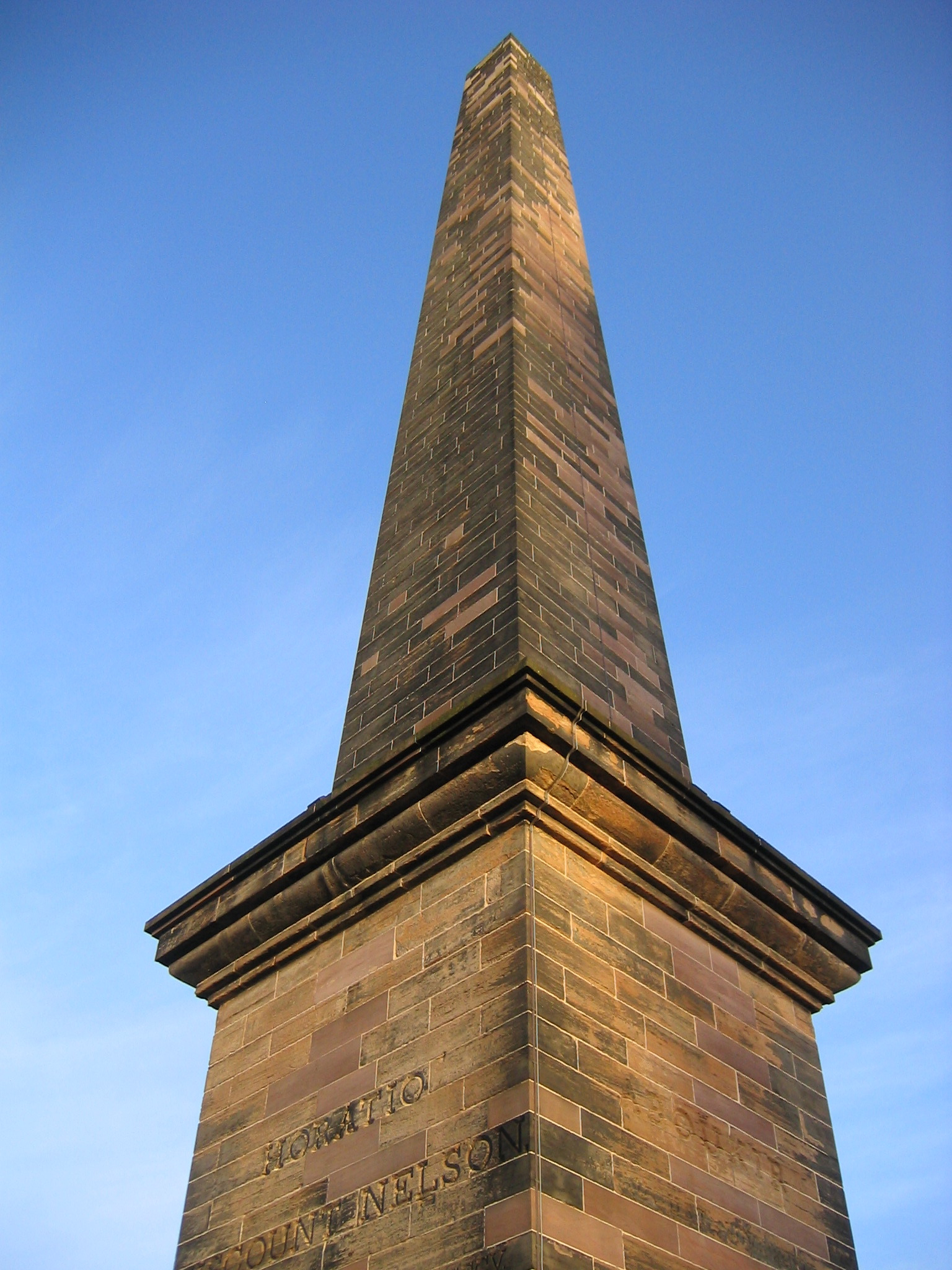
Nelson Monument in Glasgow Green

=== Nelson's Monument ===
A 43.5-metre (143 ft) tall monument to Admiral Horatio Nelson was erected in the Green in 1806, the year after his death. A Nelson monument had been erected in Taynuilt the previous year, privately funded by employees of the Bonawe Iron Foundry, which had made most of the cannonballs for the navy while it was under Nelson's command. But the Nelson monument in Glasgow Green was the first civic monument in Britain commemorating Nelson's military victories. It predated Nelson's Pillar in Dublin by two years and Nelson's Column in London by three decades. Four years after its construction it was struck by lightning, causing the top 6 metres to collapse, but the damage was promptly repaired. In 1970, the monument became listed as a category A historic site.

Over the course of two centuries since the monument was erected, it accumulated some damage. In 2002, it was repaired and restored to its original condition, and floodlights were installed for nighttime viewing. The cost of the restoration programme was £900,000.

=== St. Andrew's Suspension Bridge ===
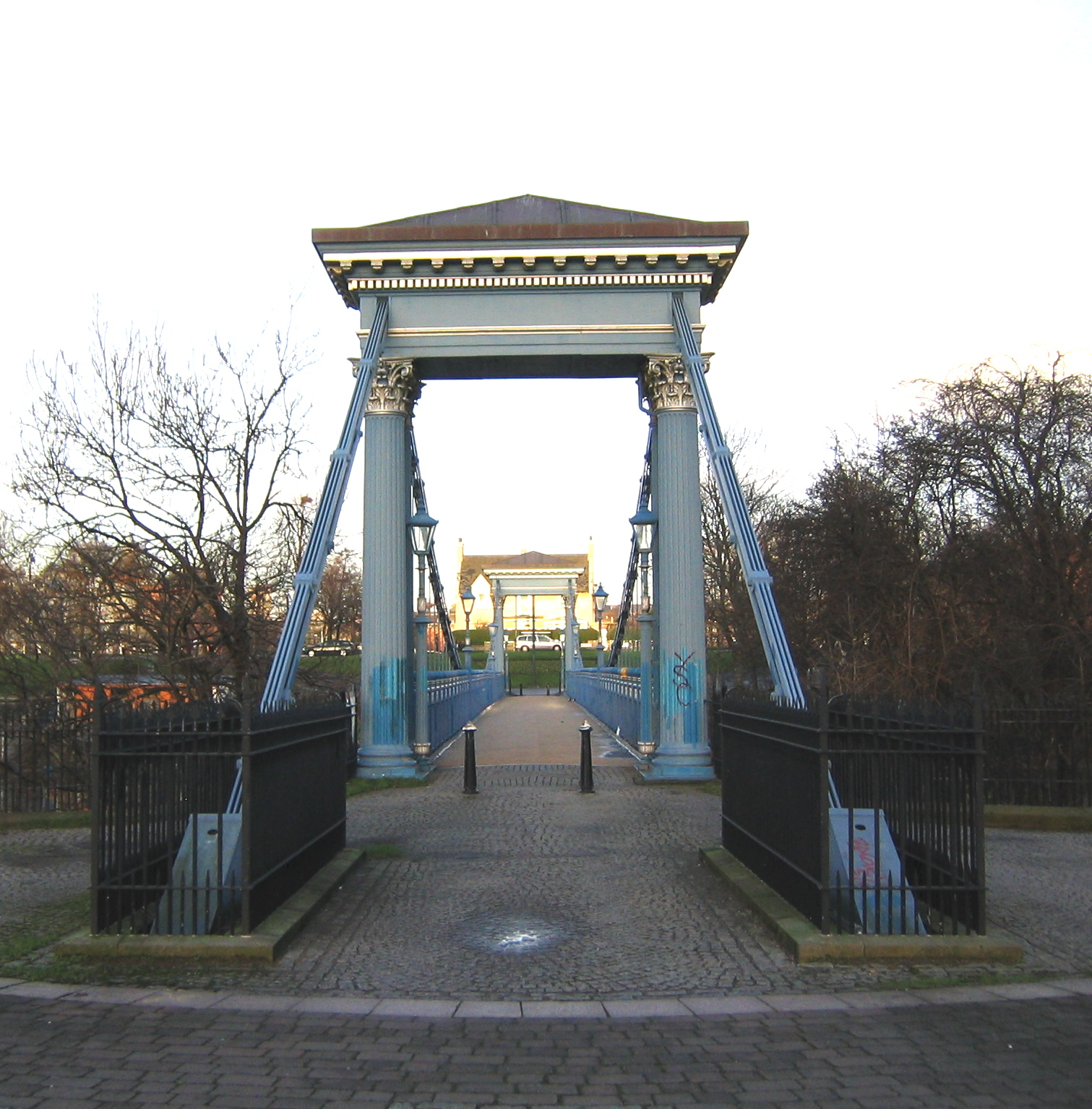
St. Andrew's Suspension Bridge, viewed from the Hutchesontown side

The St. Andrew's Suspension Bridge opened in 1855. It connects the park to the north with Hutchesontown to the south. It was meant to "replace [the] busy ferry, [by] conveying workers from Bridgeton & Calton to Hutchesontown". The bridge was repaired in 1871 and 1905. As it neared its 150th birthday, a programme to completely refurbish it was undertaken, partially funded by the European Union, and executed between 1996 and 1998. It is a category A listed structure.

=== Glasgow Humane Society ===
The Glasgow Humane Society (the oldest practical lifeboat and lifesaving organisation in the world) is based in the Green. The society's Officer's house and its boatyard are located next to the St. Andrew's Suspension Bridge.

=== Templeton Factory ===
The Templeton Carpet Factory was completed in 1889. After repeated design proposals had been rejected by the city council, James Templeton & Co employed the architect William Leiper, who designed a facade inspired by the Doge's Palace in Venice.

On 1 November 1889, the factory facade collapsed due to insecure fixings; 29 women were killed in adjacent weaving sheds. (The story was carved into a section of stone beneath the base of Templeton Gate, installed during refurbishment work to the area in 2005.) In 1900, a fire in the factory resulted in more deaths.

The building was extended in the 1930s. In 1984 it became the Templeton Business Centre. In 2005, the 1930s extension was demolished to make way for 143 new flats as part of a £22 million regeneration project, and Scottish Enterprise, the center's owners sold it for £6.7 million.

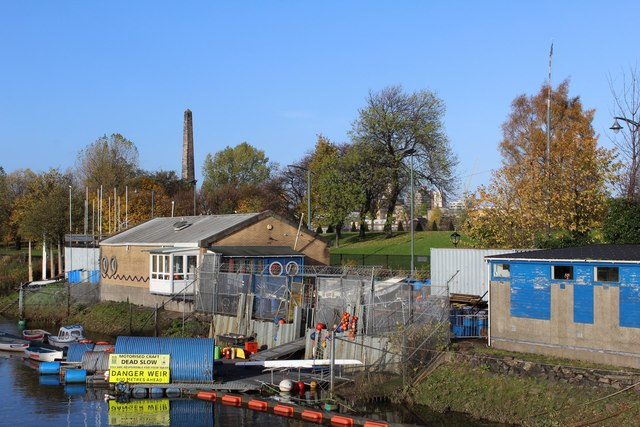
Glasgow Humane Society lifeboat station & pontoon

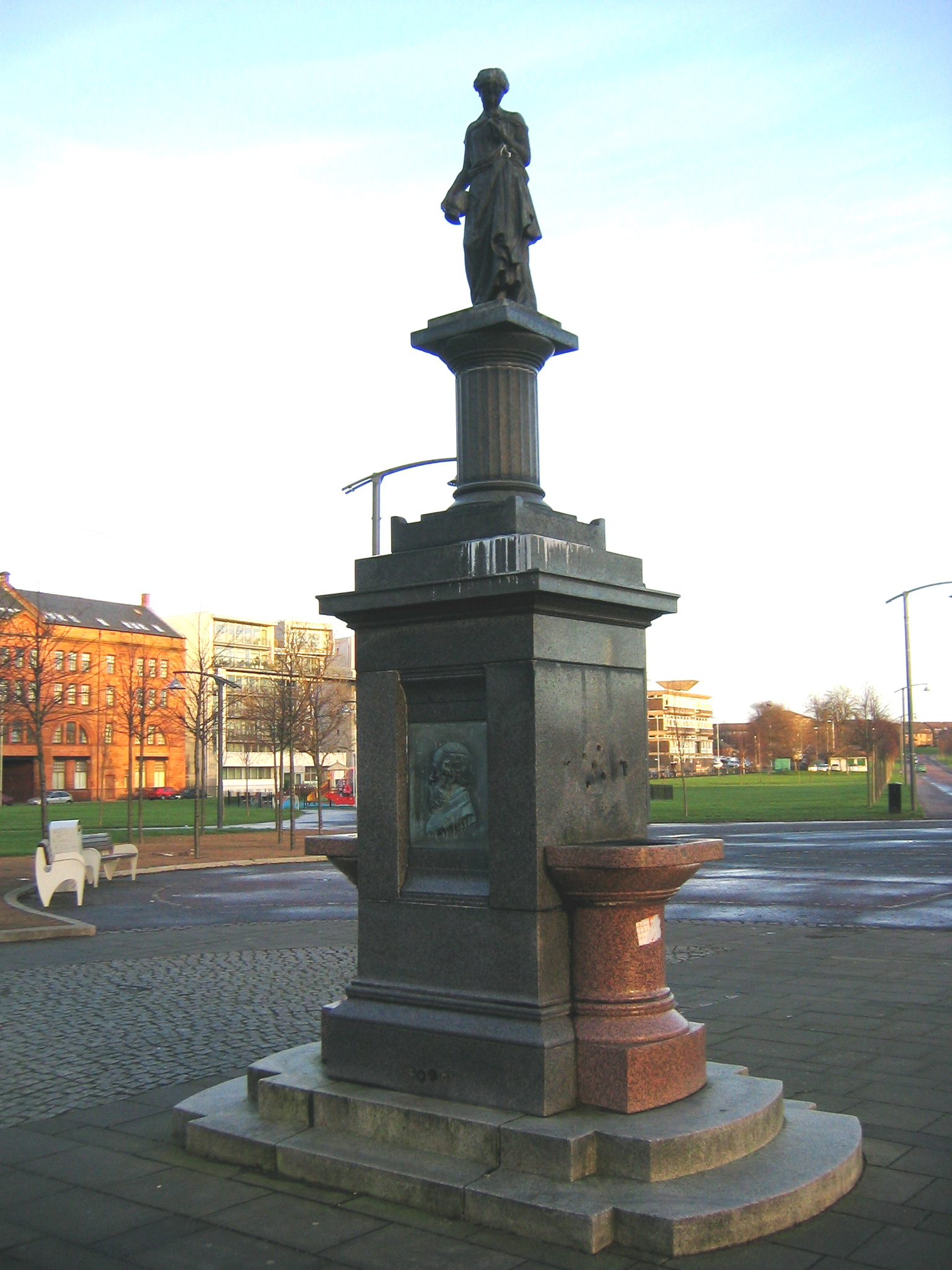
William Collins fountain in Glasgow Green

=== Fountains ===
In 1881 a fountain was erected in the park to commemorate Sir William Collins, a figure in the temperance movement who had served as Glasgow's Lord Provost between 1877 and 1880. In 1992, the fountain was moved to stand behind the McLennan Arch.

The Doulton Fountain, given by Sir Henry Doulton to Glasgow as part of the International Exhibition of 1888, was moved from Kelvingrove Park to the Green in 1890. Designed by architect Arthur E. Pearce, the 46-foot-tall (14 m) fountain was built by the Royal Doulton company to commemorate Queen Victoria's reign. It featured a 70-foot-wide (21 m) basin, with a slightly larger than life-size statue of Queen Victoria, surrounded by four life-size statues of water-carriers representing Australasia, Canada, India and South Africa. A lightning strike in 1891 destroyed the statue of Victoria, and, rather than let the city replace the statue with an urn, Doulton paid for a second hand-made statue to be produced. In the 1960s the fountain's water was turned off and it was allowed to fall into disrepair. However, in 2002, a £2 million programme began to restore the fountain to its original condition. As of 2004, the fountain had been placed in a new location, in front of the People's Palace. It is category A listed.

=== People's Palace ===
The People's Palace was opened in 1898 by the Earl of Rosebery. It was designed as a cultural centre for residents in the east end of the city. It originally had reading rooms on the ground floor, a museum on the first floor, and an art gallery on the second floor. Since the 1940s, it has been a museum dedicated to the history of Glasgow. It is category A listed.

=== McLennan Arch ===
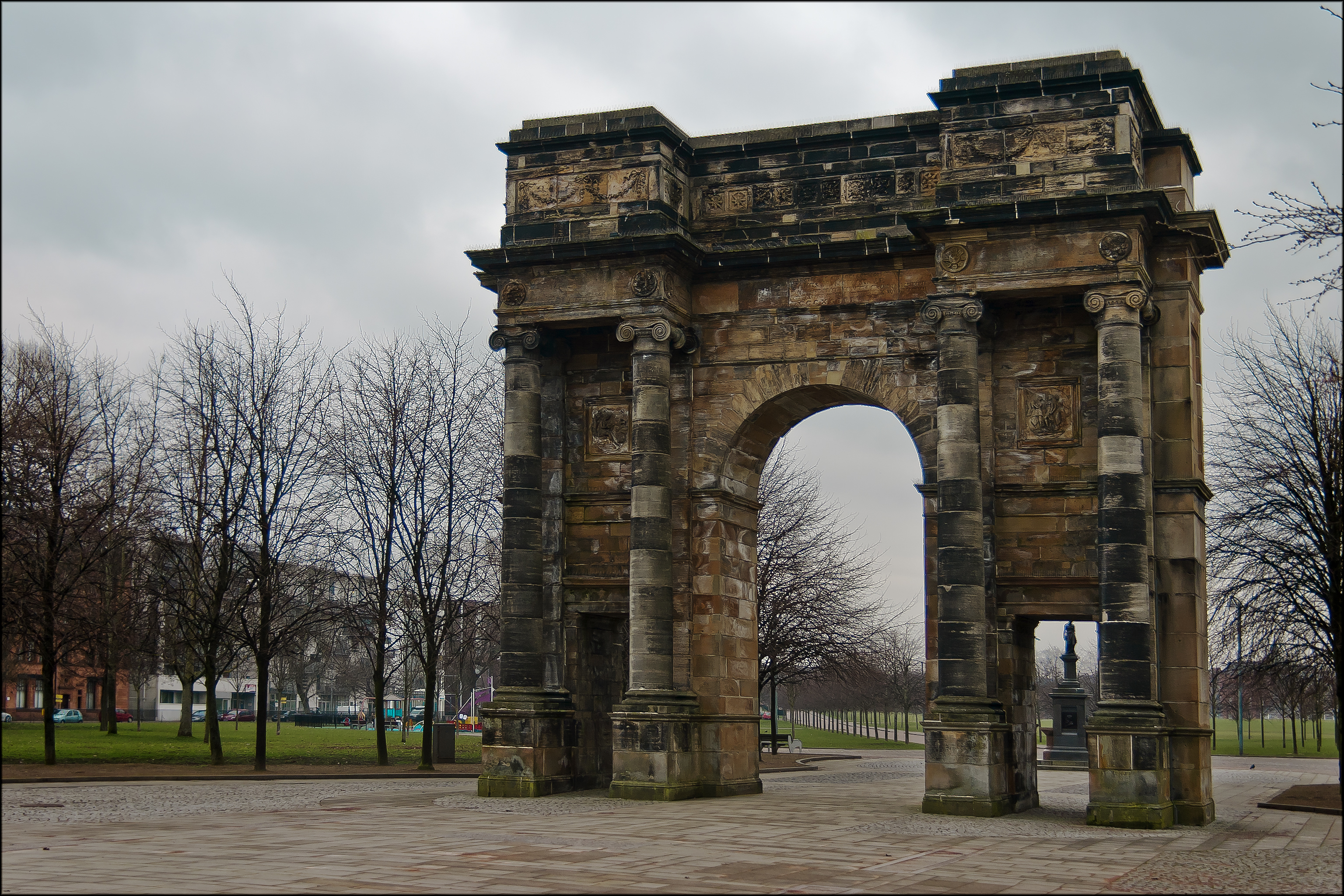
McLennan Arch at Glasgow Green

In 1890, the Assembly Rooms building that had been designed by James and Robert Adam was demolished. However, the arch that had formed the centrepiece of the building was reconstructed, with funding provided by James McLennan, and in 1893 it was sited at the western end of Monteith Row. In 1922, it was moved to the western edge of the Green, facing Charlotte Street. In 1991, it was moved again to its present position in the Green — facing the Old High Court in the Saltmarket. It is known as "The McLennan Arch".

=== Tidal Weir ===
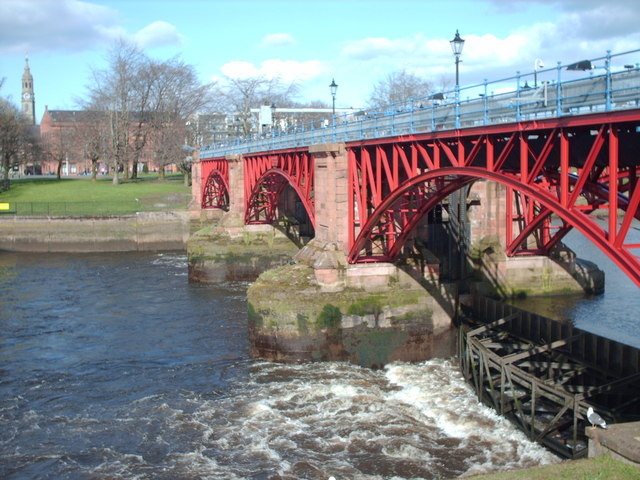
Glasgow Tidal Weir from south west (Glasgow Green on opposite bank)

In 1901, the Glasgow Corporation built a tidal weir over the River Clyde, in an effort to maintain the river's water level as it runs through the Green. The water is saltwater on the western side of the weir and fresh water on the eastern side, where it runs past the park. This has resulted in an unusual phenomenon: the development of two distinct ecosystems right next to each other. Because of its distinctive design, the weir has been made a listed building. A short distance downstream from the weir is the Albert Bridge, which connects the area to the Gorbals district south of the river.

=== Fleshers' Haugh ===
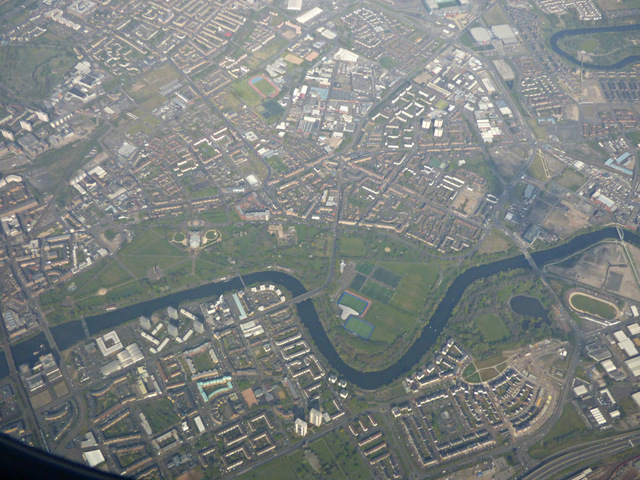
Aerial view of the area (within meander of river), 2017

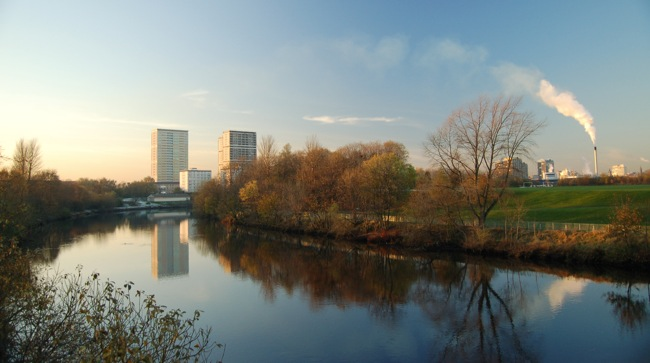
The River Clyde at Flesher's Haugh

The Glasgow Green Football Centre, featuring 18 different football pitches of various sizes and qualities, opened in November 2000 on Fleshers' Haugh, the site where Scottish football club Rangers played their first ever match against Callander over a hundred years earlier. This area is also the location of the Glasgow National Hockey Centre, built for the 2014 Commonwealth Games.

At the west side of this part of the Green is the King's Bridge providing a road link to Hutchesontown. There was a pedestrian link to the Oatlands district on the south side of the river, namely Polmadie Bridge, but in 2015 this was declared unsafe and dismantled. Further upstream at the south-east edge of the Green is Rutherglen Bridge.

Glasgow Green also has within it part of National Cycle Route 75, which runs from Argyll to Edinburgh, as well as the Clyde walkway, which runs from the City Centre to New Lanark.

== See also ==
- Glasgow Golf Club
