= Jack Fleming (footballer) =

Australian rules footballer

Personal information
- Full name: John Fleming
- Born: 26 August 1876; Inverell, New South Wales
- Died: 19 September 1933 (aged 57); Inverell, New South Wales
- Position: Follower / Forward

Playing career^{1}
Years	Club	Games (Goals)
1897–98	South Melbourne	12 (0)
- ^{1} Playing statistics correct to the end of 1898.

Jack Fleming (26 August 1876 – 19 September 1933) was an Australian rules footballer who played with South Melbourne in the Victorian Football League (VFL).
