= Sean Fleming =

Sean Fleming may refer to:

- Sean Fleming (gridiron football) (born 1970), former Canadian football placekicker and punter
- Seán Fleming (born 1958), Irish Fianna Fáil politician
- Shaun Fleming (born 1987), American actor and musician
