= John Knox (artist) =

Scottish landscape artist

John Knox (1778–1845) was a 19th-century Scottish landscape artist who painted in the style of Alexander Nasmyth. He is noted for adopting unusual positions from which to paint, such as mountaintops.

== Works ==
John Knox was "An important and influential figure in the history of Scottish landscape art.", quoted by Peter McEwan.

Knox was a part of the early 19th-century Scottish 'topographic' or landscape tradition which developed in that period, the leading proponent being Alexander Nasmyth. He worked very much in the manner of Alexander Nasmyth and may indeed have been a pupil of his for a time. However, he developed his own style of landscape painting, favouring broad sweeping views, often from high elevation locations.

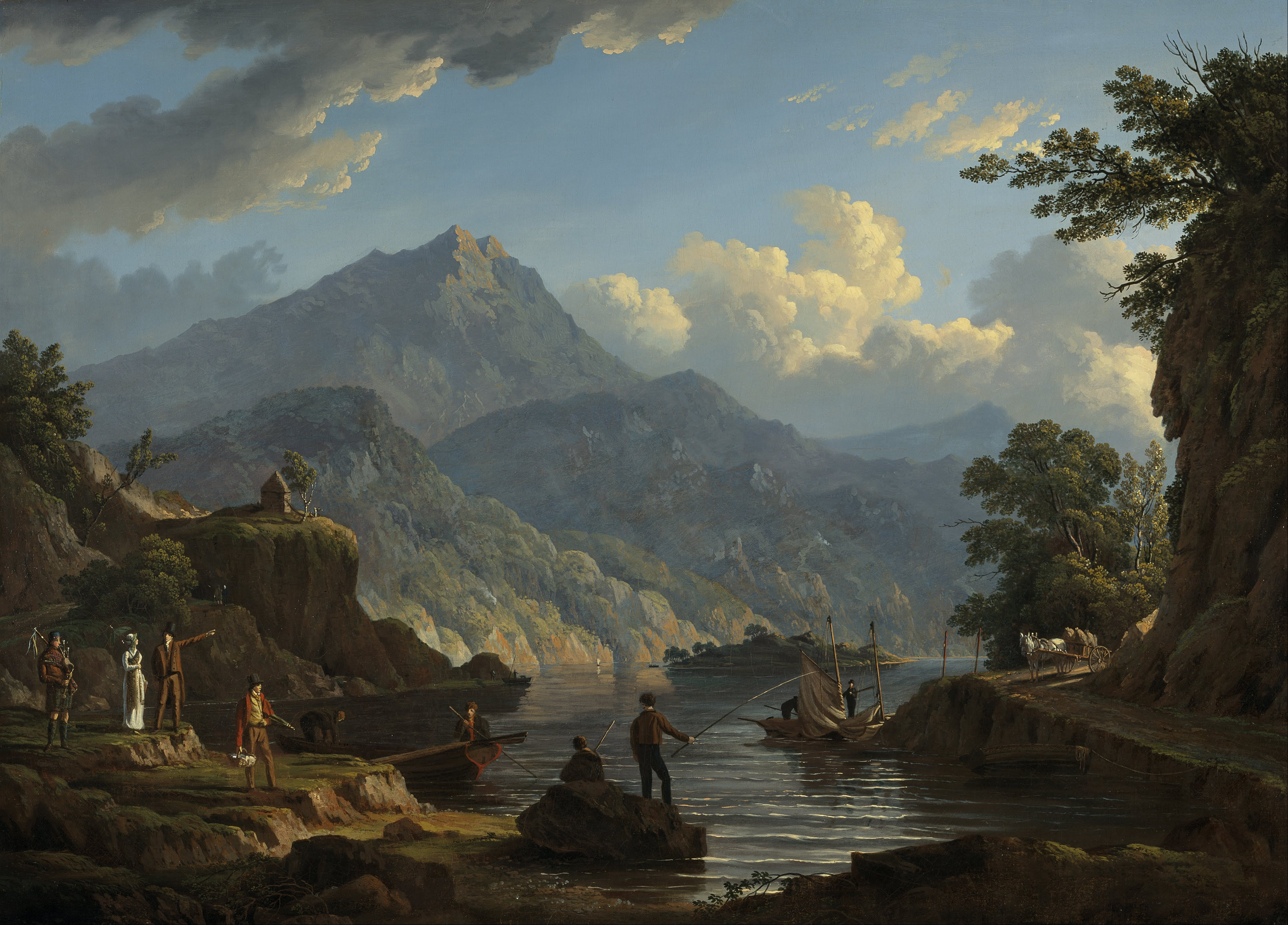
Landscape with Tourists at Loch Katrine – John Knox

An important but relatively unknown part of his early career was the painting of 'Panoramas'. This technique, developed in the late 18th and early 19th centuries, involved the creation of large circular or semicircular paintings showing a sweeping view of a city or landscape, often many metres in diameter. Between 1809 and 1814 Knox created six of these Panoramas, which were variously displayed in Glasgow, Edinburgh, London and Dublin. It is not known why he stopped producing these, but thereafter he concentrated on oil painting, lithography and teaching.

While none of his Panoramas are known to survive, the paintings 'North Western View from Ben Lomond' and 'South Western View from Ben Lomond', both painted from the top of Ben Lomond, circa 1834, give a feel for how the 'Panoramas' themselves would have looked. These paintings are now held in the Kelvingrove Art Gallery and Museum, Glasgow.

Most of his oil paintings tended to be of the west of Scotland, including Glasgow itself, for example 'The Nelson Monument on Glasgow Green Struck by Lightning' (Kelvingrove Art Gallery, circa 1810), although there are a number of Highland views as well. The Fleming Collection describes Knox as "a significant and original landscape painter of the nineteenth century." The Collection holds three of John Knox's works, 'A Highland Landscape' (described as 'Glencoe' by Halliwell), 'The Head of Glen Sannox, Arran' and 'View of the Clyde from Faifley and Duntocher'. Knox was also an active teacher, some of his pupils were Horatio McCulloch, W L Leitch and Daniel Macnee.

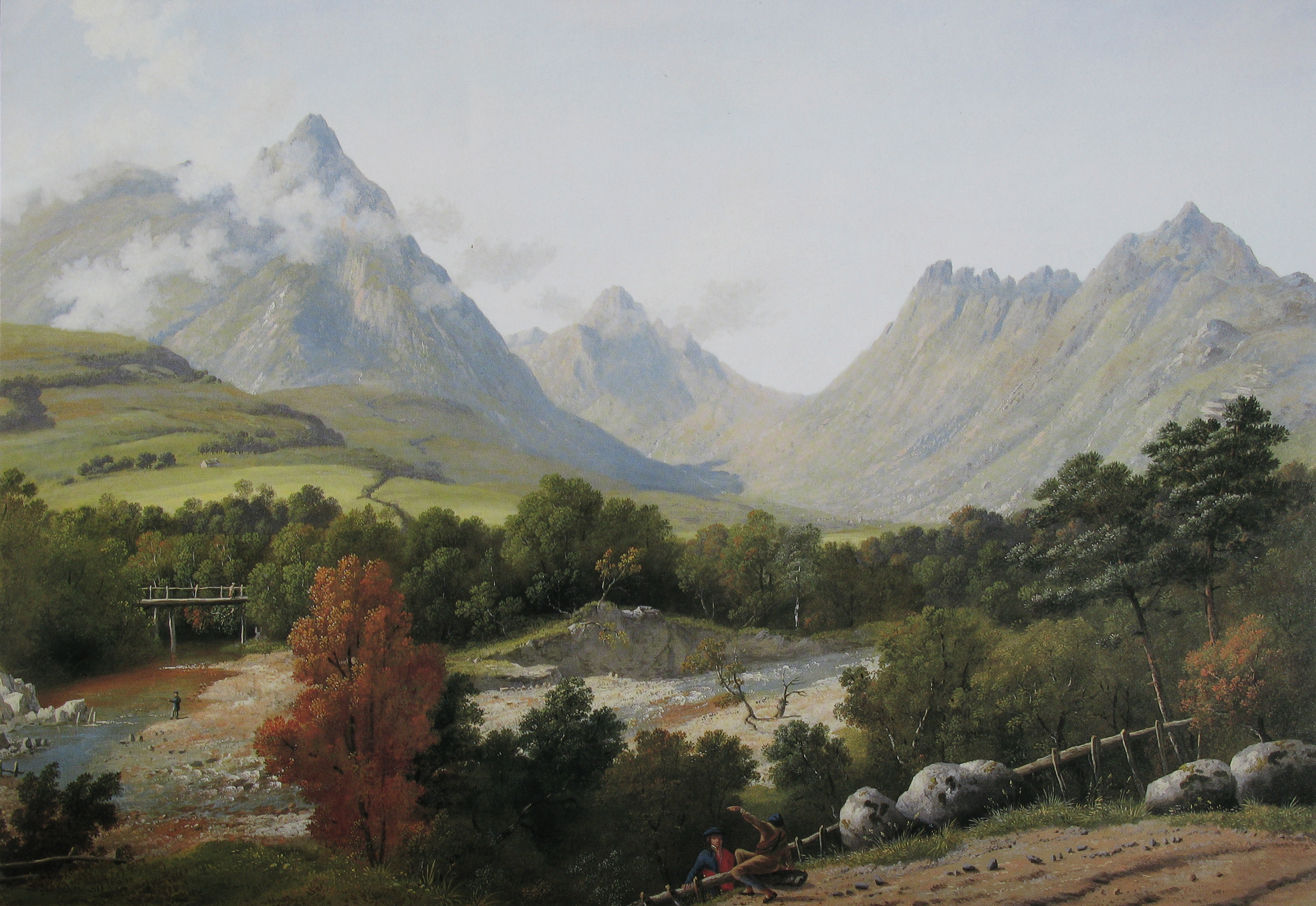
Glen Sannox, Arran, Clyde Estuary – John Knox

That Knox is not better known and more widely appreciated may be due to the fact that he remained in Glasgow, "until the second half of the nineteenth century Edinburgh was culturally pre-eminent in Scotland and Glasgow citizens were generally regarded as 'shopkeepers, mechanics and successful pedlars'", quoted in Couldrey. He did however exhibit a number of times in exhibitions, including several times at the Royal Academy in London, for example in 1829 he exhibited a view of Inveraray Castle (No 376) and 'No 88 View in the Trosacks' and again in 1832 and 1835. He also exhibited at the Glasgow Dilettante Society in 1831.

Despite the quality and originality of his work, Knox was neither an Academician or an Associate of the Royal Scottish Academy, nor does Rinder list him as exhibiting pictures there, despite him being an active painter during the early years of the academy. He remained Glasgow based, before moving to Keswick in the Lake District in 1840, where he had family connections. Hall in 'The Artists of Cumbria' lists a 'KNOX, T (fl 1849)' living in Keswick as having exhibited a view of Derwent Water at the RA in 1849, this was his son Thomas. John Knox died in 1845.

In the opinion of Marcus Halliwell "He was an underrated artist, overshadowed by his mentor Alexander Nasmyth and his pupil Horatio McCulloch."

== Life ==
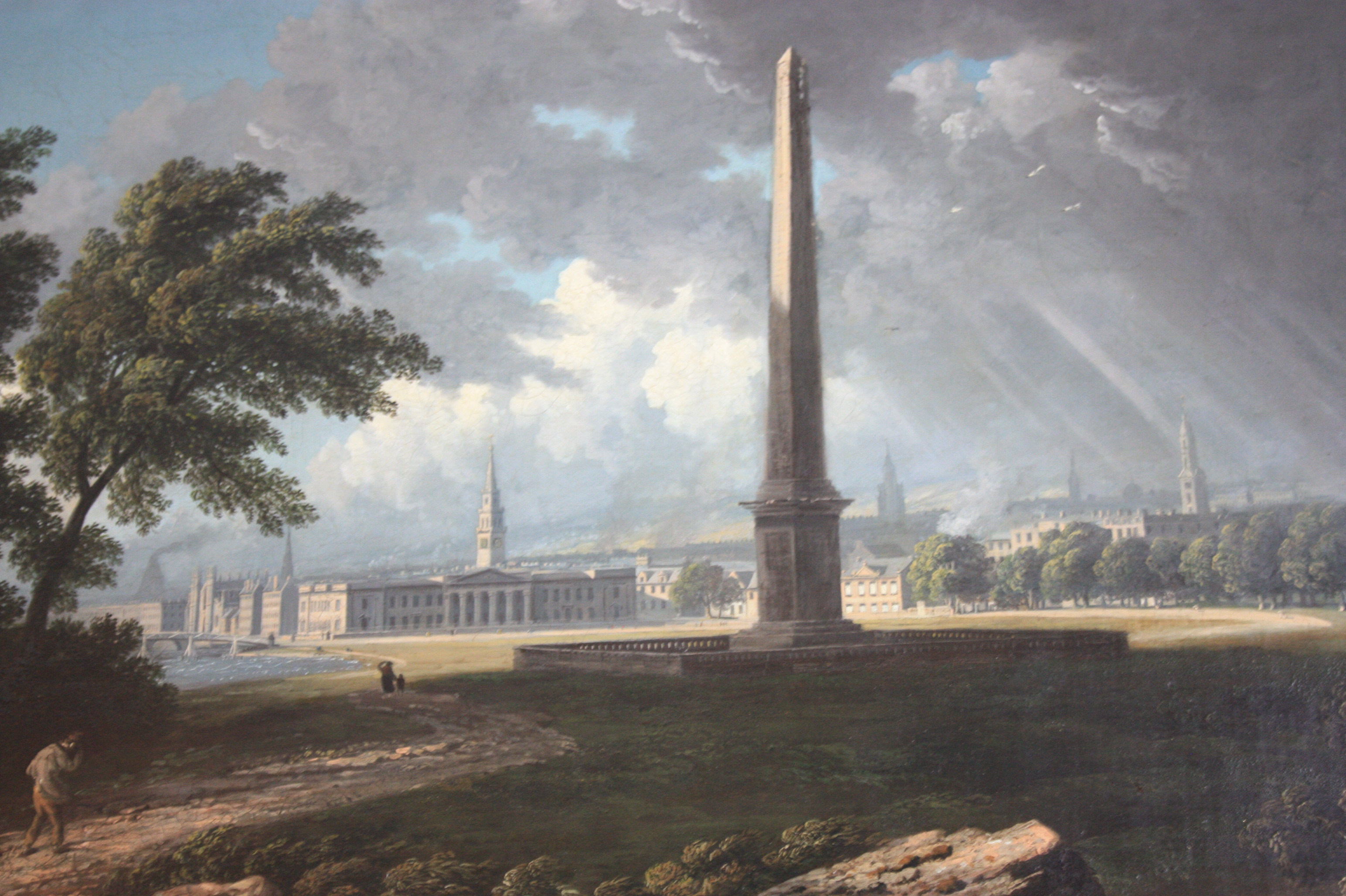
Glasgow Green by John Knox c.1810

Knox was born the son of John Knox in 1778. His family moved to Glasgow in 1799. He is thought to be the "John Knox Jr, portrait painter" mentioned in the 1810 Glasgow Post Office Directory living at 34 Miller Street. Knox's father, also John, was a yarn or thread merchant, with a business, John Knox & Sons in Glasgow, so the family may have been relatively well off. Nevertheless, it does not seem to be known as to how Knox was able to fund the painting and presentation of his 'Panoramas'. His wife was Sarah and they had at least one son, Thomas. Through Sarah's family connections with Keswick in the Lake District, they moved there in 1840 when Knox would have been aged 62. Thereafter, Knox seems to have produced little in the way of further paintings. He does not feature in Bicknell or 'The Artists of Cumbria'.

== Known works ==
- Glasgow Green (c.1810) - Georgian House Museum, Charlotte Square
- Lake District Scene
- Landscape with Tourists at Loch Katrine National Museum of Scotland
- Old Glasgow Bridge (1817)
- Oxen on a Bridge
- Seascape with Lighthouse
- South-Western View of Ben Lomond (1834)
- The Cloch Lighthouse
- The Head of Glen Sannox, Arran
- The First Steamboat on the Clyde (c.1820)
- The Road Home – Loch Katrine
- View of Loch Lomond
- View of the Clyde from Faifley and Duntocher
