= James P. Fleming =

US Air Force officer and Medal of Honor recipient

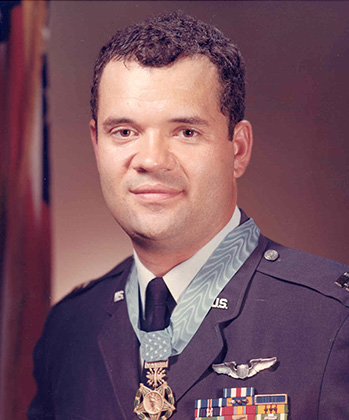
- James P. Fleming
- Born: March 12, 1943 (age 83); Sedalia, Missouri, U.S.
- Military career
- Allegiance: United States
- Branch: United States Air Force
- Service years: 1966–1996
- Rank: Colonel
- Units: 20th Special Operations Squadron; MACV-SOG
- Conflicts: Vietnam War
- Awards: Medal of Honor; Silver Star; Legion of Merit; Distinguished Flying Cross; Meritorious Service Medal (2); Air Medal (8)

James Phillip Fleming (born March 12, 1943) is a former United States Air Force pilot who served in the Vietnam War. Born in Sedalia, Missouri, he was awarded the Medal of Honor for rescuing a six-man MACV-SOG reconnaissance team, stranded between heavily defended enemy positions, near Đức Cơ, Vietnam in 1968.

== Early life ==
Born in March 12, 1943 in Sedalia, Missouri, Fleming attended Washington State University and entered military service at Pullman, Washington.

== Military career ==
In 1968, Fleming was an aircraft commander of a UH-1F transport helicopter assigned to the 20th Special Operations Squadron at Ban Me Thuot East Airfield in the Republic of Vietnam. On November 26, a six-man reconnaissance team of Army Special Forces Green Berets had been lifted into Vietnam's western highlands, near the Cambodian border and about 30 miles (48 km) west of Pleiku. Hours later, they found themselves penned up next to a river, with enemy forces on the three remaining sides. The team leader's call for immediate evacuation was received by an Air Force forward air controller (FAC), Major Charles E. Anonsen, as well as Fleming's nearby flight of five UH-1s. All five helicopters, despite being low on fuel, headed toward the coordinates while the FAC briefed them on the situation.

The Green Berets were taking heavy fire from six heavy machine guns and an undetermined number of enemy troops. As soon as the helicopters sighted the team's smoke, the gunships opened fire, knocking out two machine gun positions. One gunship was hit and crash-landed across the river, its crew picked up by another of the transports. A second transport, low on fuel, had to pull out of formation and return to base. There were only two helicopters left, Fleming's and one other that was almost out of ammunition.

Hovering just above the jungle treetops, Fleming inspected the only clearing near enough for the troops to reach and found it impossible to land there. He instead flew over the river and hovered just above the water, with his landing skids against the bank, hoping that the special forces troops would be able to run the few yards to his helicopter safely. In addition to exposing his aircraft to ground fire, this maneuver was a balancing act that required great piloting skill. After waiting for several minutes, the reconnaissance team radioed that they could not survive a dash to the helicopter. Fleming lifted his UH-1 out of range of the hostile fire.

The FAC directed the Green Berets to detonate their mines as Fleming made a last attempt to rescue them. As the mines exploded, he again lowered his helicopter to the river bank, balancing against it, giving the Green Berets an open cargo door through which to leap to safety. The enemy soldiers concentrated their fire on the UH-1. The Green Berets ran for the chopper, firing as they ran and killing three Viet Cong barely 10 feet (3.0 m) from the aircraft. As they leaped through the cargo door, Fleming once more backed the helicopter away from the bank and flew down the river to safety.

In a ceremony at the White House on May 14, 1970, President Richard Nixon presented the Medal of Honor to Fleming for his actions during the rescue. Fleming's other decorations include the Silver Star, the Distinguished Flying Cross and eight Air Medals.

Fleming remained in the air force, becoming a colonel and a member of the Officer Training School staff at Lackland Air Force Base, Texas, before his retirement in 1996.

== Awards and decorations ==
Fleming's decorations include:

US Air Force Command Pilot Badge
| Medal of Honor | Silver Star | Legion of Merit |
| Distinguished Flying Cross w/ "V" device | Meritorious Service Medal w/ 1 bronze oak leaf cluster | Air Medal w/ 1 silver and 2 bronze oak leaf clusters |
| Air Force Presidential Unit Citation w/ 1 bronze oak leaf cluster | Air Force Outstanding Unit Award w/ "V" device and 3 bronze oak leaf clusters | Air Force Organizational Excellence Award |
| Combat Readiness Medal | National Defense Service Medal w/ 1 bronze service star | Armed Forces Expeditionary Medal |
| Vietnam Service Medal w/ 4 bronze campaign stars | Air Force Overseas Short Tour Service Ribbon | Air Force Overseas Long Tour Service Ribbon |
| Air Force Longevity Service Award w/ 1 silver and 1 bronze oak leaf clusters | Small Arms Expert Marksmanship Ribbon | Air Force Training Ribbon |
| Vietnam Gallantry Cross w/ Bronze Star | Republic of Vietnam Gallantry Cross | Vietnam Campaign Medal |

=== Medal of Honor citation ===
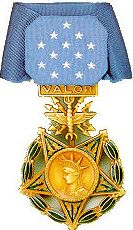
Air Force version of the Medal of Honor

Fleming's official Medal of Honor citation reads:

For conspicuous gallantry and intrepidity in action at the risk of his life above and beyond the call of duty. Capt. Fleming (then 1st Lt.) distinguished himself as the Aircraft Commander of a UH-1F transport Helicopter. Capt. Fleming went to the aid of a 6-man special forces long range reconnaissance patrol that was in danger of being overrun by a large, heavily armed hostile force. Despite the knowledge that 1 helicopter had been downed by intense hostile fire, Capt. Fleming descended, and balanced his helicopter on a river bank with the tail boom hanging over open water. The patrol could not penetrate to the landing site and he was forced to withdraw. Dangerously low on fuel, Capt. Fleming repeated his original landing maneuver. Disregarding his own safety, he remained in this exposed position. Hostile fire crashed through his windscreen as the patrol boarded his helicopter. Capt. Fleming made a successful takeoff through a barrage of hostile fire and recovered safely at a forward base. Capt. Fleming's profound concern for his fellowmen, and at the risk of his life above and beyond the call of duty are in keeping with the highest traditions of the U.S. Air Force and reflect great credit upon himself and the Armed Forces of his country.

== See also ==
- List of Medal of Honor recipients for the Vietnam War
