= Mike Fleming (talk radio host) =

Mike Fleming (1942 – May 8, 2016) was a conservative radio talk show host in Memphis, Tennessee. He was a commentator of the traditional journalistic school with an enhanced personality. Fleming worked for newspapers in Tennessee and Florida.

The most common topics of his show, which aired from 4 to 7 p.m. CST on WREC, were reserved for the city government, in particular Mayor W. W. Herenton and House Speaker Jimmy Naifeh, whom he routinely referred to as "King Willie" and "Neanderthal Naifeh" for their alleged abuses of government and ethical violations. He also strongly criticized the powerful political Ford family, particularly former state senator John Ford and former U.S. Representative Harold Ford, Jr.

On April 28, 2009, Clear Channel Communications Inc., the largest owner of U.S. radio stations, said it was cutting 590 jobs including Fleming.

Fleming died on May 8, 2016, at the age of 74.
