= Josh Fleming (cricketer) =

English cricketer (born 1989)

Personal information
- Full name: Joshua David Fleming
- Born: 29 June 1989 (age 37); Crawley, Sussex, England
- Batting: Right-handed
- Bowling: Right-arm medium

Domestic team information
- Years: Team
- 2011–2012: Oxford MCCU

Career statistics
Competition	First-class
Matches	2
Runs scored	30
Batting average	7.50
100s/50s	0/0
Top score	13
Catches/stumpings	0/–
- Source: Cricinfo, 16 July 2020

Joshua David Fleming (born 29 June 1989) is an English former first-class cricketer.

Fleming was born at Crawley and later studied at Oxford Brookes University. While studying at Oxford Brookes, he made two appearances in first-class cricket for Oxford MCCU against Nottinghamshire and Worcestershire at Oxford in 2011 and 2012 respectively. (Note: Oxford MCCU differed from Oxford University Cricket Club in that it was open to students at Oxford Brookes University, whereas Oxford University Cricket Club is exclusively for students of the constituent colleges of the University of Oxford.) He scored 30 runs in his two matches, with a high score of 13.
