= Monuments and memorials to Horatio Nelson, 1st Viscount Nelson =

Horatio Nelson, 1st Viscount Nelson (1758–1805) was a British flag officer in the Royal Navy famous for his participation in the Napoleonic Wars, most notably in the Battle of Trafalgar, during which he was killed. He was responsible for several famous victories that helped to secure British control of the seas, both securing Britain from French invasion and frustrating Napoleon's imperial ambitions. After his death during his defeat of the combined French and Spanish fleets at Trafalgar, there was a public outpouring of grief. Nelson was accorded a state funeral and was buried in St Paul's Cathedral.

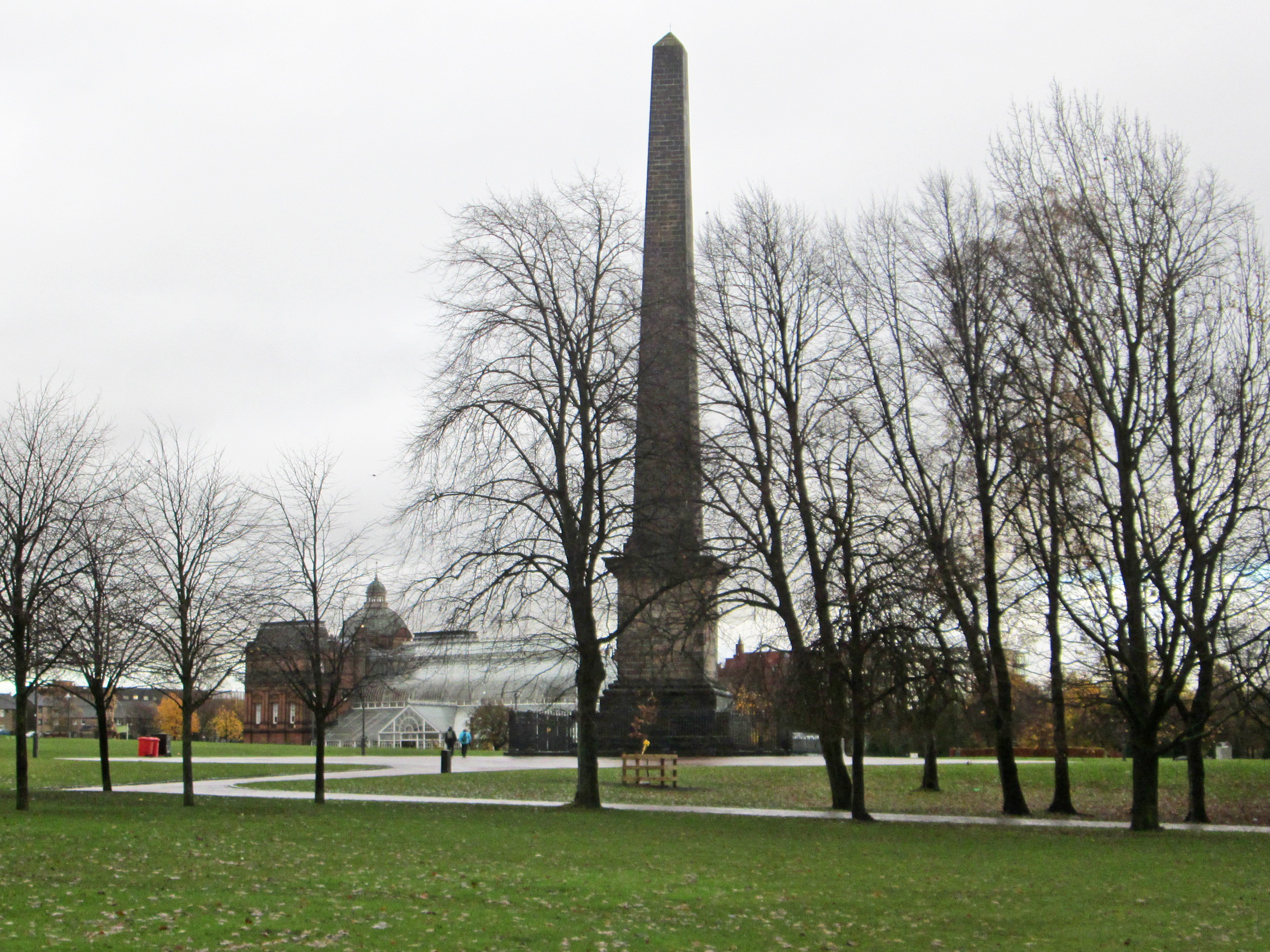
The Nelson Monument on Glasgow Green was erected 1806–1807, and described as the first civic monument in the UK to Nelson's victories including Trafalgar.

A number of monuments and memorials were constructed across the United Kingdom of Great Britain and Ireland to honour his memory. The period of British dominance of the seas that his victories were considered to have ushered in led to a continued drive to create monuments in his name across the British Empire. These have taken many forms.

== Locations ==
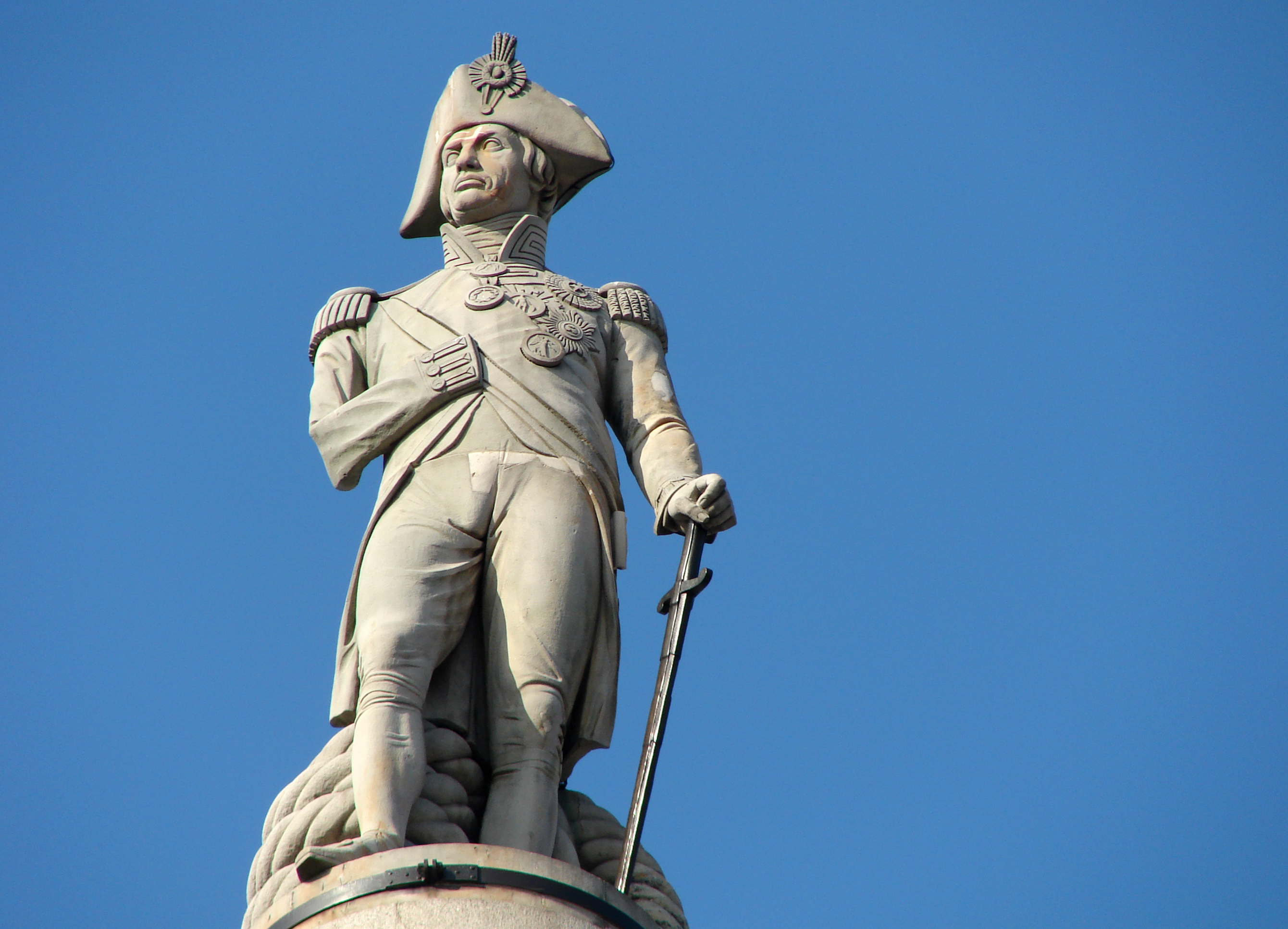
Lord Nelson atop Nelson's Column in Trafalgar Square.

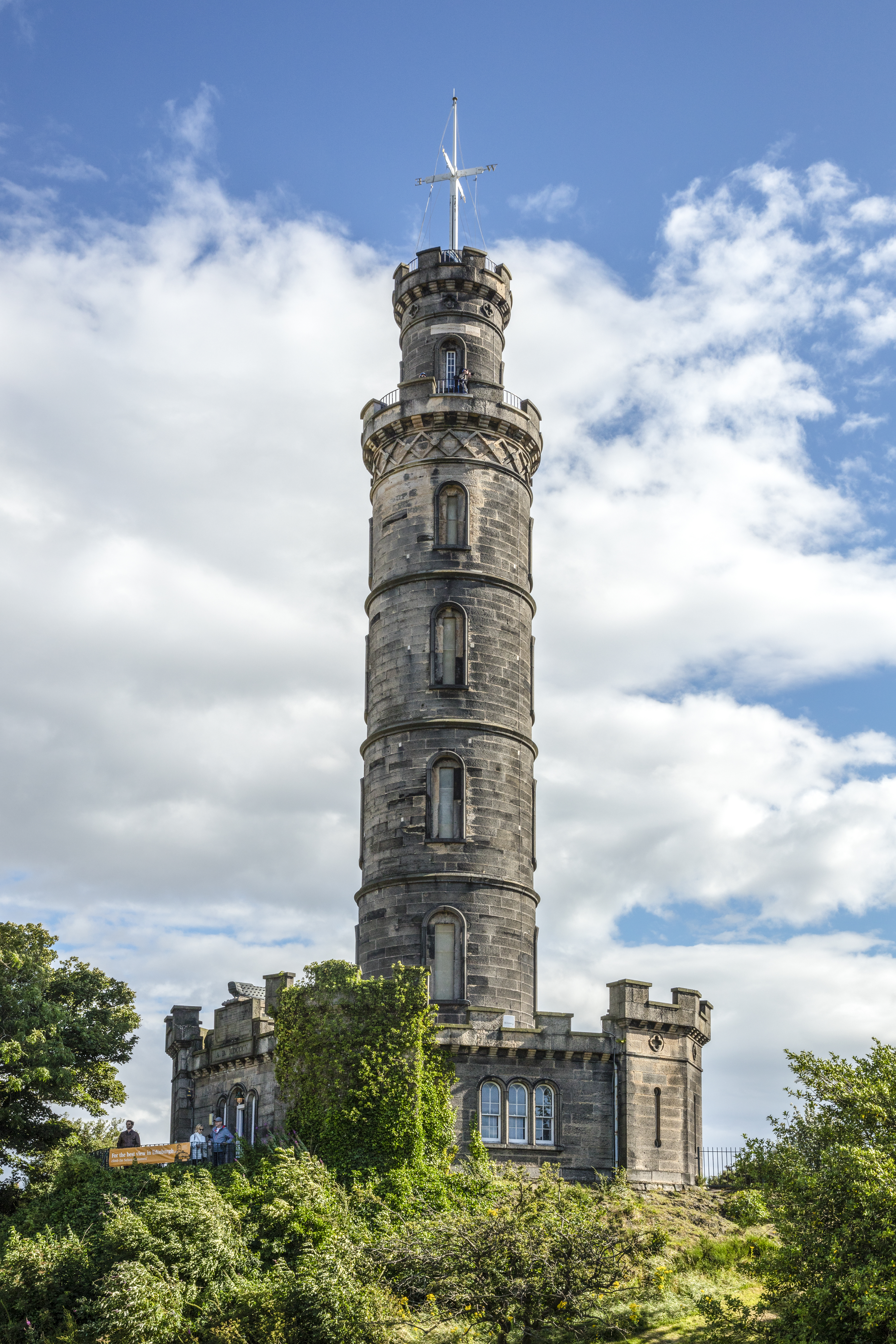
Nelson Monument in Edinburgh

The monumental Nelson's Column (built in the 1840s) and the surrounding Trafalgar Square are notable locations in London to this day, and Nelson's funerary monument can be found in the south transept of St Paul's Cathedral. There are three great collections of items that belonged to him, or were made to commemorate him that are still visible today: at the Royal Naval Museum in HMNB Portsmouth, at the National Maritime Museum at Greenwich and in the Lloyd's building in the heart of London. Also at Portsmouth, Nelson's flagship at Trafalgar, HMS Victory is preserved; on the quarterdeck, a small brass plaque with the inscription "Here Nelson fell 21st Oct 1805" records the place where Nelson was shot.

=== Sited in Great Britain ===
The first large monument to Nelson was the 43.5 m (143 ft) tall Nelson Monument on Glasgow Green. Funded by public subscription, its foundation stone was laid on 1 August 1806, and it was finished on 7 August 1807. Also in Scotland, the foundation stone for Nelson's Tower at Cluny Hill, Forres, was laid in 1806 and it was completed in 1812. The Nelson Monument in Edinburgh was later constructed atop Calton Hill in Edinburgh between 1807 and 1816.

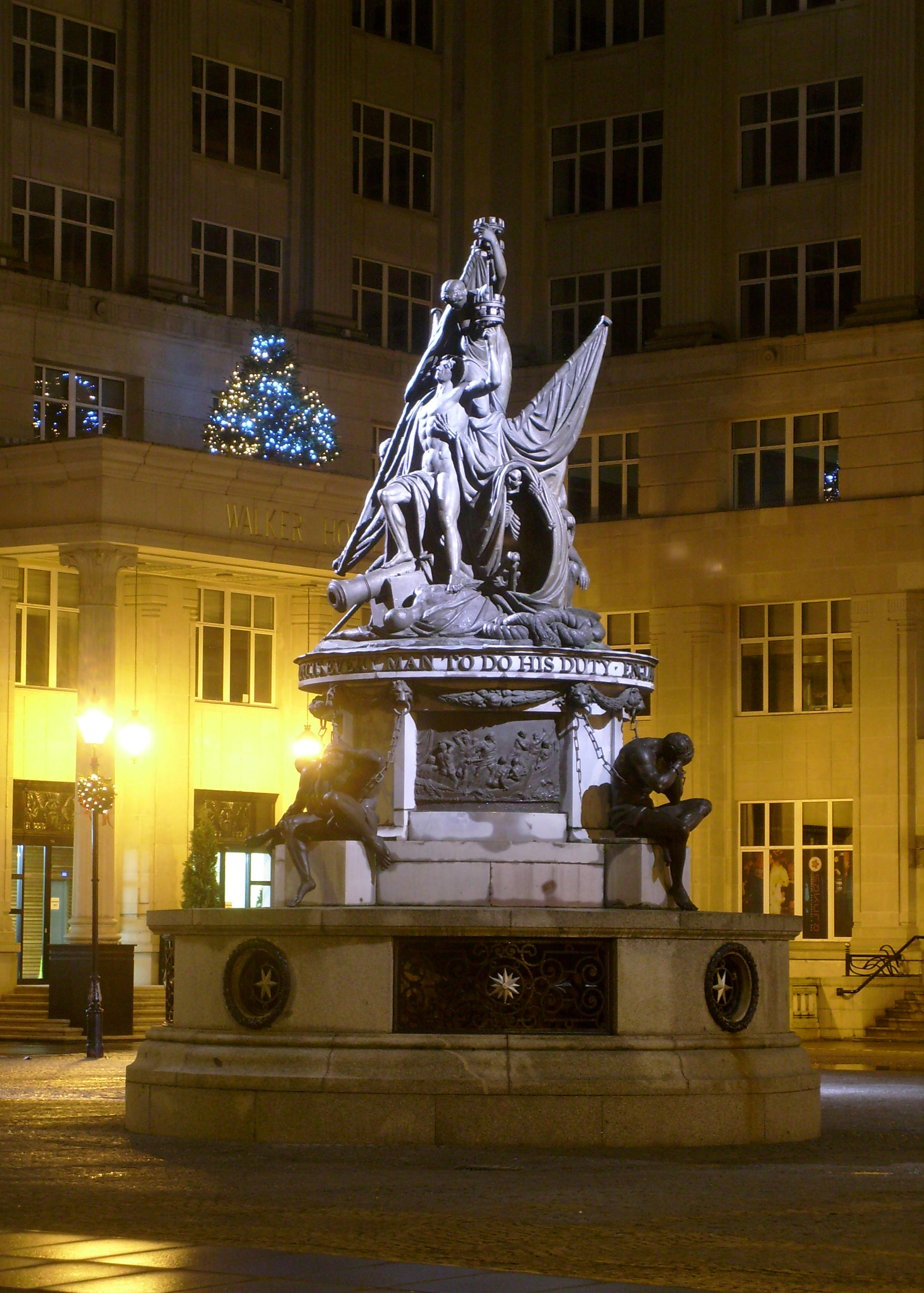
The Nelson Monument in Liverpool.

In October 1809, the statue of Nelson in Birmingham was the second monument to him funded by public subscription in Great Britain, and the second to be completed in his honour in the country. It was sculpted by Richard Westmacott and is currently a Grade II* listed building. Westmacott also sculpted memorials in Liverpool, which is also Grade II*, and Bridgetown, Barbados. The Liverpool monument is a depiction of a goddess handing a naked Nelson the crowns of victory while a sinister, skeletal figure of Death clutches at his breast. Four despondent French prisoners-in-chains sit at the base.

The officers and men who fought at Trafalgar erected a memorial column to the north of Portsmouth atop Portsdown Hill. The 36.5 m (120 ft) high obelisk features the inscription "Consecrated to the memory of Viscount Lord Nelson. By the zealous attachment of all those who fought at Trafalgar to perpetuate his triumph and their regret 1805. Foundation stone laid July 1807".

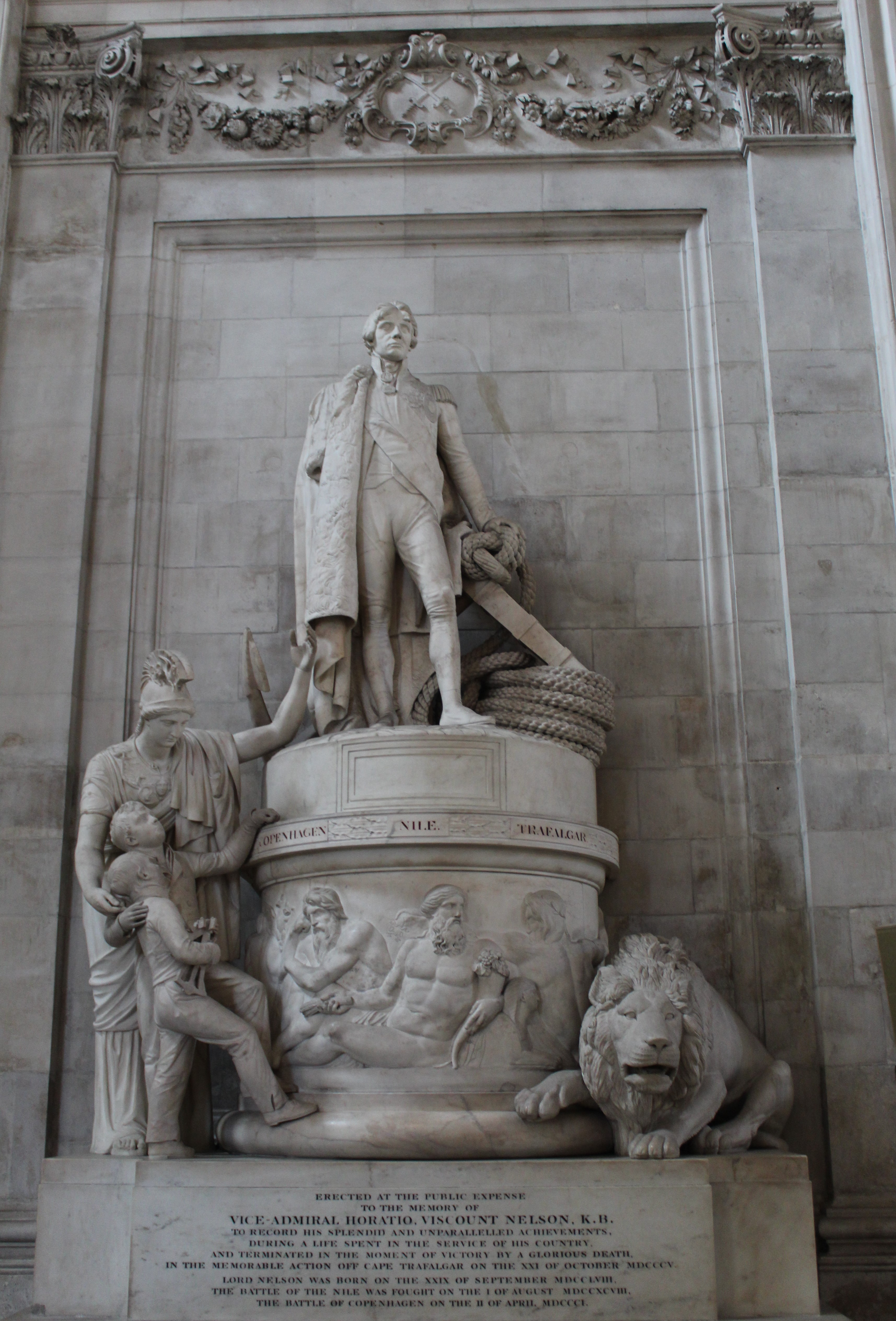
John Flaxman's monument to Nelson in the nave of St Paul's Cathedral, London

Parliament voted the funds for a monument to Nelson to be erected in the nave of St Paul's Cathedral in London, the site of Nelson's tomb. The monument by John Flaxman was unveiled in 1818 and consisted of a larger than life statue of Nelson leaning on an anchor and a coiled rope, above a figure of Britannia who is pointing out the admiral to two boy sailors. The inscription on the pedestal mentions Nelson's "splendid and unparalleled achievements" and his "life spent in the service of his country, and terminated in the moment of victory by a glorious death".

The 44 m (144 ft) tall columnar Monument in Great Yarmouth to Nelson was started before his death but only completed in 1819. Properly called the Norfolk Naval Pillar, it is generally known as the "Britannia Monument" as it is topped by the martial female personification of the UK rather than a statue of Nelson; a statue of Nelson is, however, in the grounds of Norwich Cathedral alongside the other Napoleonic hero, the Duke of Wellington, near the school he attended. Another columnar monument is situated on Castle Green, Hereford. Nelson was made a freeman of the city in 1802, and he reportedly spent a lot of time at Ross-on-Wye. The column was erected in 1809, four years after Nelson's death, but has no statue at the top as there was insufficient money left to commission one. Over the border into Wales, Nelson's Seat, in the now restored Nelson Garden in Monmouth, commemorates his visit to the town in 1802.

One of the most unusual monuments was constructed on Salisbury Plain, within cannon shot of Stonehenge, on land then owned by the Marquess of Queensberry. The monument consists of a series of clumps of trees in otherwise arable farmland. Known as the Nile Clumps they have been arranged to represent the positioning of French and British ships at the Battle of the Nile, considered as Nelson's greatest tactical victory. Some clumps still survive, and work is underway to replant some of those that have "sunk". They stand on land owned by the National Trust, forming part of the Stonehenge Landscape estate.

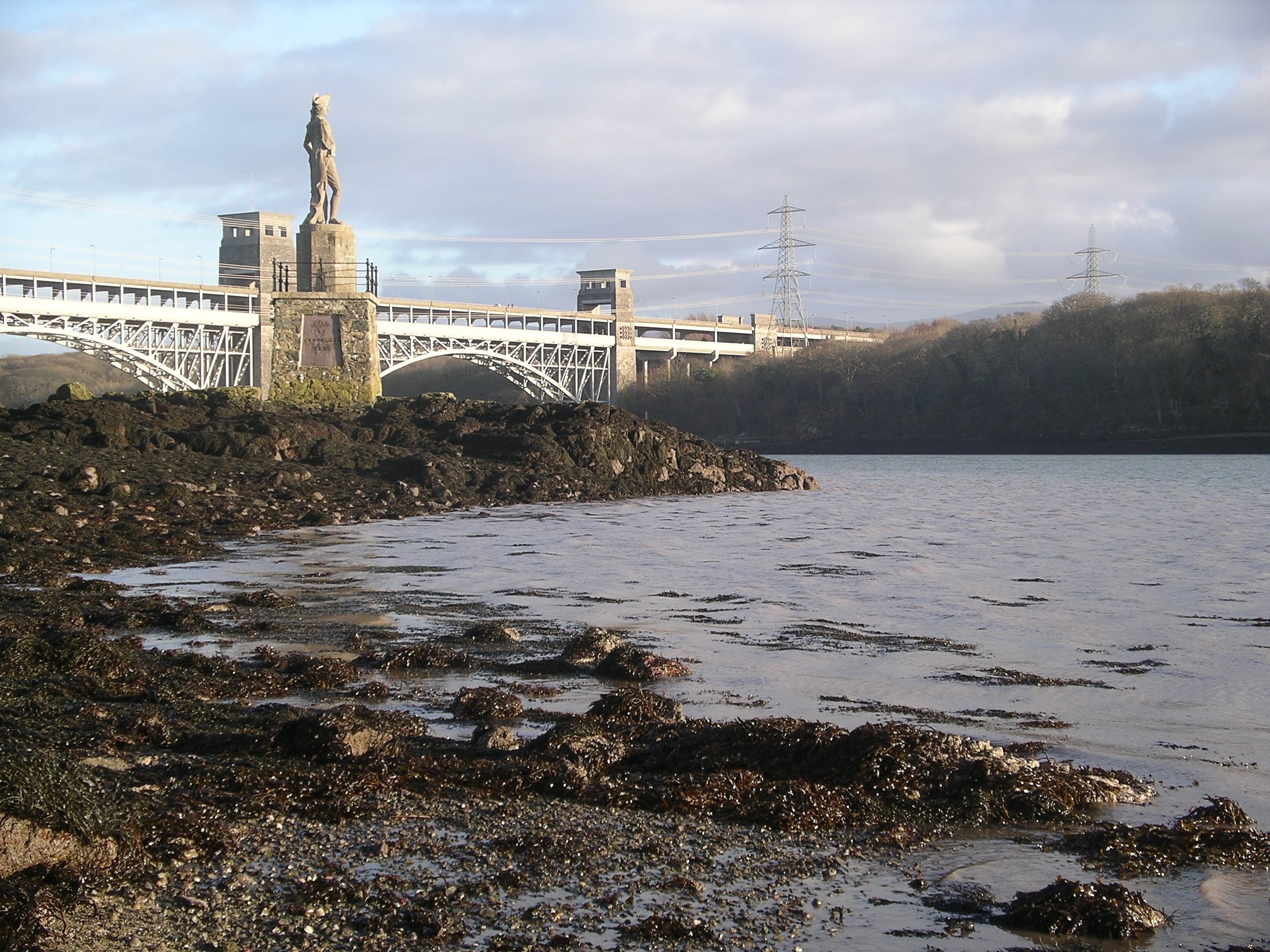
Britannia Bridge with memorial in foreground

There is also a memorial to Nelson on the banks of the Menai Strait in North Wales. This memorial stands at an out-of-the-way site on the shore below Plas Llanfair, in Llanfairpwll on the Anglesey shore. It was created by Admiral Lord Clarence Paget, who lived in the mansion and who was an enthusiastic amateur sculptor. The monument is made of stone, inscribed with the words "Nelson" on the base of the statue. The words "Fell at Trafalgar 1805" are engraved in slate on the west side of the plinth and repeated in welsh on the east side. On the south side is a slate engraved with "England expects that every man will do his duty". The view from this position is of the Menai Strait, which Nelson was reputed to have described as "one of the most treacherous stretches of sea in the world." There is also the Nelson memorial in Swarland, Northumberland which was raised as a private memorial of Nelson by his friend and sometime agent, Alexander Davison. Davidson also planted trees just to the west of the obelisk to represent the coastline of the Nile Delta and some of the ships that took part in the Battle of the Nile.

Although it does not bear his name, Paxton's Paxton's Tower near Llanarthney in Carmarthenshire, Wales was built in Nelson's honour. It once bore the following inscription: "To the invincible Commander, Viscount Nelson, in commemoration of the deeds before the walls of Copenhagen, and on the shores of Spain; of the empire every where maintained by him over the Seas; and of the death which in the fulness of his own glory, though ultimately for his own country and for Europe, conquering, he died; this tower was erected by William Paxton." (see British Listed Buildings)

Although his country house at Merton no longer exists and his estate was broken up and built over, Nelson's association with the area is commemorated in the names of a number of local roads, a trading estate on part of his former lands and Nelson Hospital in Merton Park. Nelson's funerary hatchment is displayed at St. Mary's Church of England, also in Merton Park, London SW19.

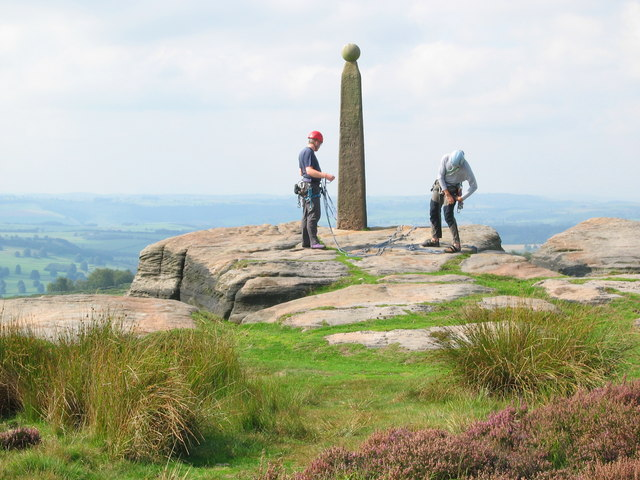
Nelson's Monument on Birchen Edge in Derbyshire dates from 1810.

There is a Nelson's Monument on Birchen Edge, in the Peak District national park in Derbyshire. The monument itself consists of a 3-metre-tall (9.8 ft) gritstone obelisk, surmounted by a ball 30 cm in diameter. The column is inscribed with the date of Nelson's death and some other letters which may be later graffiti. A modern metal plaque shows that the monument was restored in 1992 by the 1805 Club and the Peak District National Park. Three nearby gritstone outcrops, known as the "Three Ships" because of their slight resemblance to ships' prows, are inscribed VICTORY, DEFIANCE and ROYAL SOVERIN (sic), named after British warships at Trafalgar. The monument was created in 1810 and is thought to have been funded by John Brightman from the local village of Baslow.

The perhaps most recent monument to Nelson is a statue erected in 1951, sculpted by F Brook Hitch to a lifelike design by Dr H J Aldous. It originally stood in Pembroke Gardens, Southsea but was moved in 2005 onto Grand Parade at Portsmouth near the point where he boarded Victory for his last journey, as part of the Trafalgar bicentenary commemorations.

In 1995, in honour of Nelson, The Admiral Lord Nelson School was built in Portsmouth. The school has established and maintains strong links with the Royal Navy and was involved in the bicentennial commemoration of the Battle of Trafalgar.

Throughout October, Trafalgar Night dinners are held in Royal Navy ships and establishments. After the Loyal Toast, there is always a toast drunk to Nelson's "Immortal Memory".

=== Ireland ===
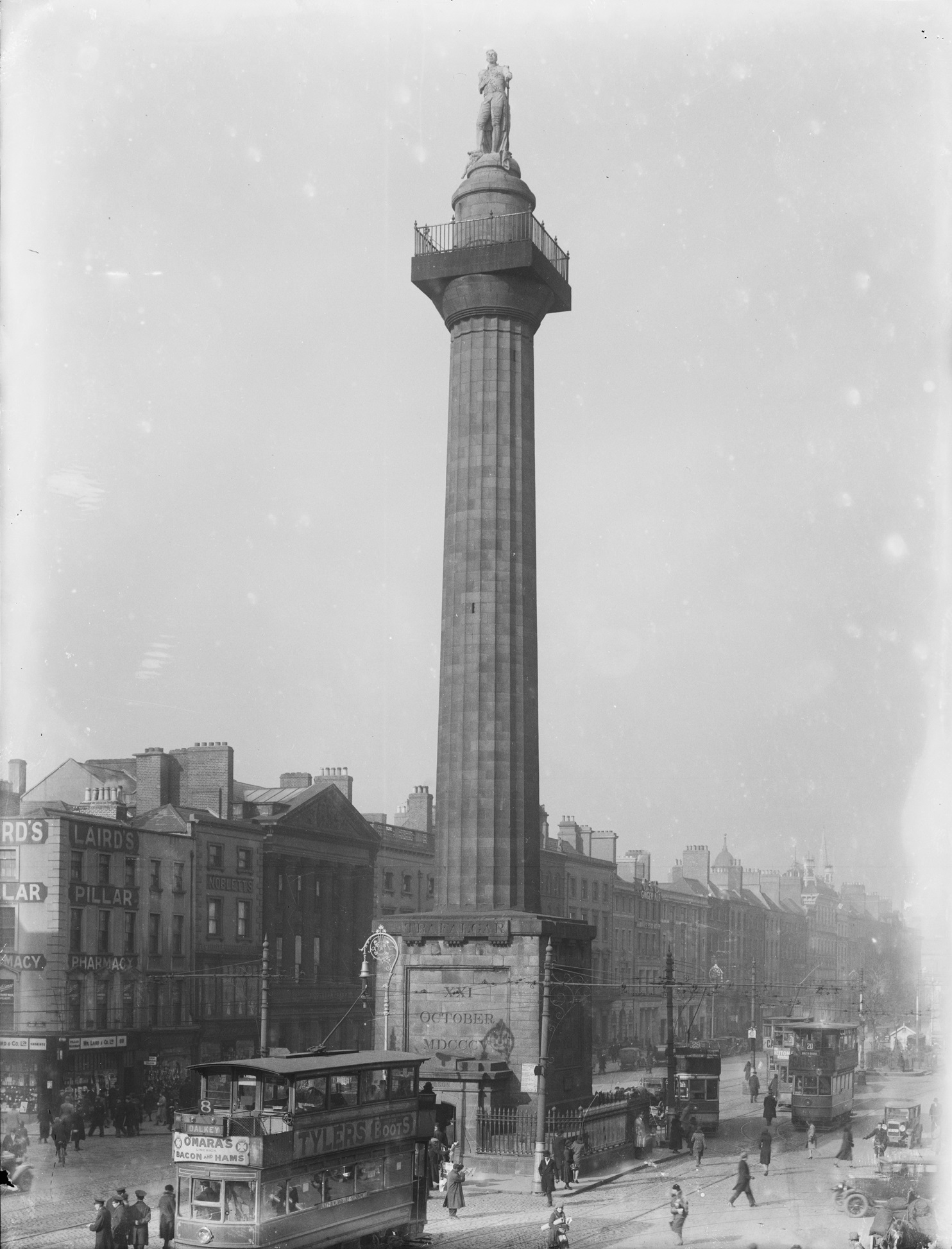
Nelson Pillar, Dublin; since destroyed

A memorial to Nelson is located in the County Antrim town of Dervock, Northern Ireland. In the Allen Memorial Hall belonging to St Coleman's Church of Ireland, a large stained glass triptych depicts the moment on the poop deck of the Victory when Nelson ordered the flying of the ‘England Expects’ signal just before the Battle of Trafalgar. The connection with Dervock is seen in the panel portraying the red-jacketed Captain William Adair, from Ballymena, in County Antrim, the commander of the marine force on the Victory, who was to die alongside Nelson. A smaller window in the hall shows the Victory locked in conflict with the French ship Redoubtable.

Nelson's Pillar in Dublin was funded by public subscription, and was completed in the second half of 1809. It survived controversy and rebellion and Ireland's exit from the United Kingdom in 1922, but it was destroyed by a bomb planted by former IRA men in 1966, on the eve of the 50th anniversary of the Easter Rising.

A monument was erected to Nelson in County Cork, Ireland. It is claimed that it was erected within four days of the news of the admiral's death reaching London on 6 November 1805. The monument consisted of a large rough stone arch on a hilltop near Castletownshend. It was destroyed 150 years later by Irish republicans. This Nelson Arch, as it was known, was the work of Captain Joshua Rowley Watson RN, then commander of the Sea Fencibles based in Castletownshend. One of the few surviving images of the arch dates from 1896. It is a photograph reproduced in the Journal of the Cork Historical and Archaeological Society, and shows the arch largely intact, but with vegetation sprouting from it. The first mention of politically motivated damage to the arch comes in 1920, when according to some accounts it was ‘destroyed’ during the War of Independence, and re-erected two years later. It was again attacked in 1966, this time so seriously that the Townshend family, who whose land it stood, could do little more than erect a much smaller version from the wreckage. That in turn was demolished in 1976.

=== Overseas ===
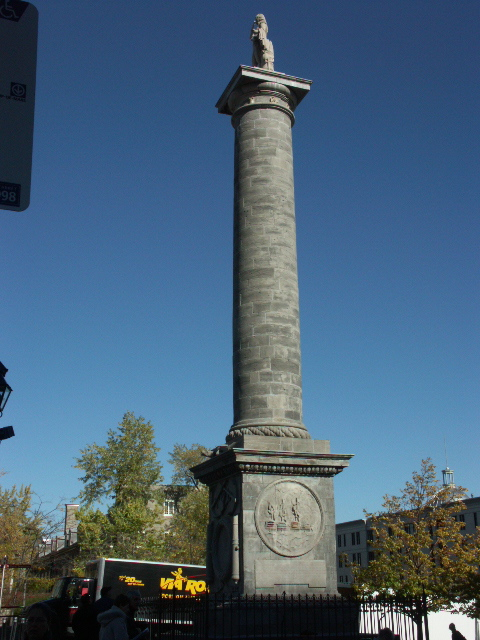
Nelson Column, Montreal

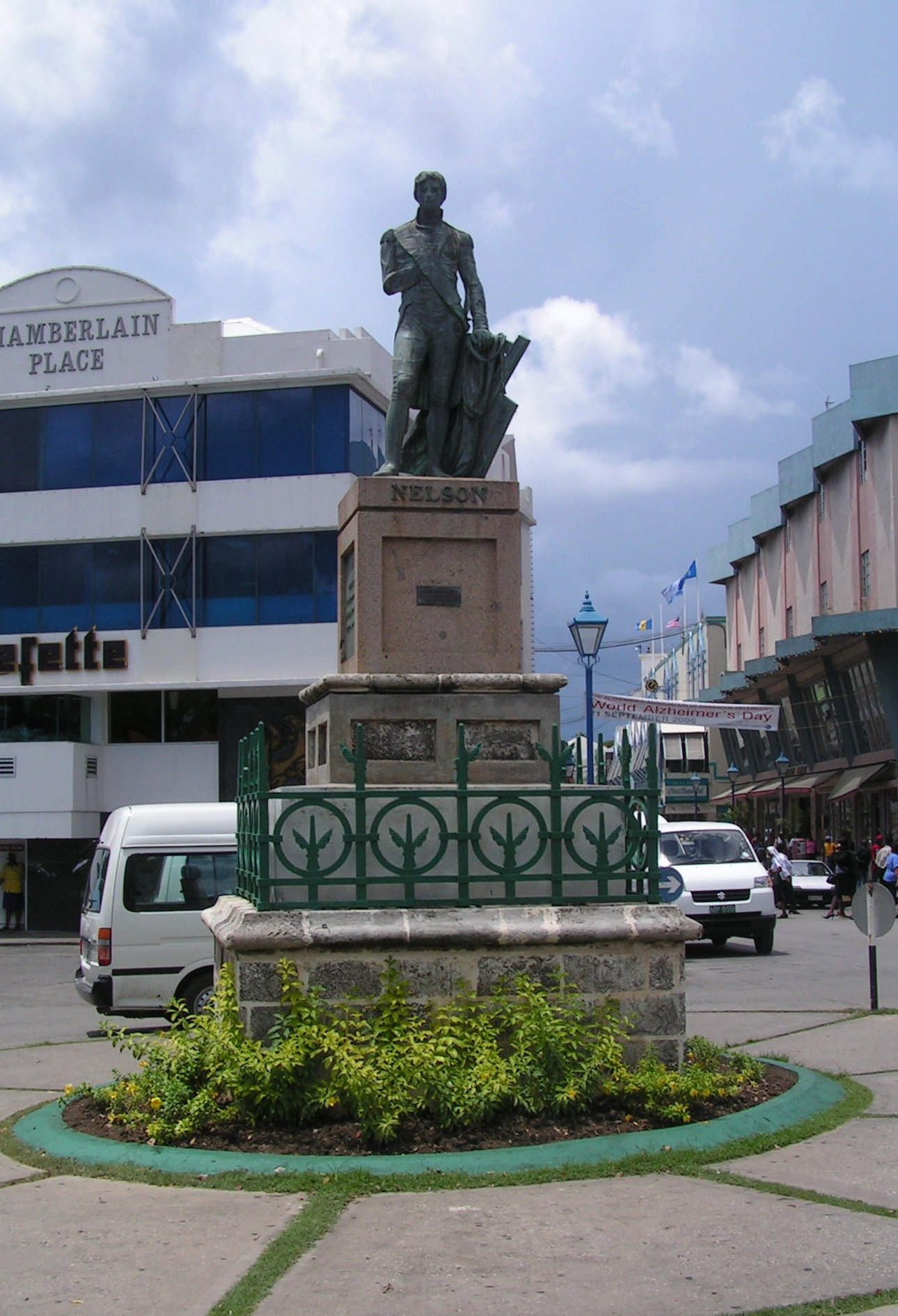
Nelson Statue, Bridgetown, Barbados

Several places overseas have been named after Nelson. The city of Nelson, New Zealand bears his name as well as Nelson Island on the Sunshine Coast, British Columbia, Canada. There is also Nelson's Island, in Aboukir Bay, the site of Nelson's victory at the Battle of the Nile.

Nelson's Column, Montreal is located in the city where Nelson had reportedly fallen in love with a young woman. Components of the monument were shipped there in 1808, and it was erected in 1809. It is located in Place Jacques-Cartier, which was a marketplace at the time. As the Dublin monument is no longer extant, it is the oldest surviving monument to Nelson outside of Great Britain. Subscribers for the monument included both English- and French-speaking residents, since the French Revolution was popular with neither. The monument is located in Vieux Montreal. It has carved scenes from Nelson's career around the base and the statue on top was claimed to be the oldest public statue of Nelson in the world. It was removed due to excessive weathering and has been placed in the Montreal History Centre. A copy now stands atop the column in its place. Over time the column became more controversial as some French-speaking Québécois perceived it as a sign of British imperialism. In 1890, a group of Quebec nationalists unsuccessfully plotted to blow up the monument. Four decades later, in 1930, French-speaking residents erected a statue of French Navy officer Jean Vauquelin in a nearby city square (which was subsequently named after him) in response to the continued presence of the monument.

On the island of Nevis, West Indies, where Nelson met and married Frances Nisbet, there are two place names: Nelson's Spring and Nelson's Lookout.

On the island of Antigua, West Indies, there is a house at Nelson's Dockyard that is historically taught to be Nelson's house while he was stationed in the Caribbean.

On 28 October 2005, a statue of Nelson was unveiled in Gibraltar 200 years after Nelson's death.

In 1813, a statue was erected in Bridgetown, Barbados, in what was known as Trafalgar Square, (now renamed National Heroes' Square) in recognition of Nelson's bravery and as a tribute to his honour within the British Empire. This statue was sculpted from bronze by Sir Richard Westmacott and is considered by many as an exact likeness to the man himself. This statue was erected some 27 years before another one of the same likeness was erected in London.

== Gallery ==
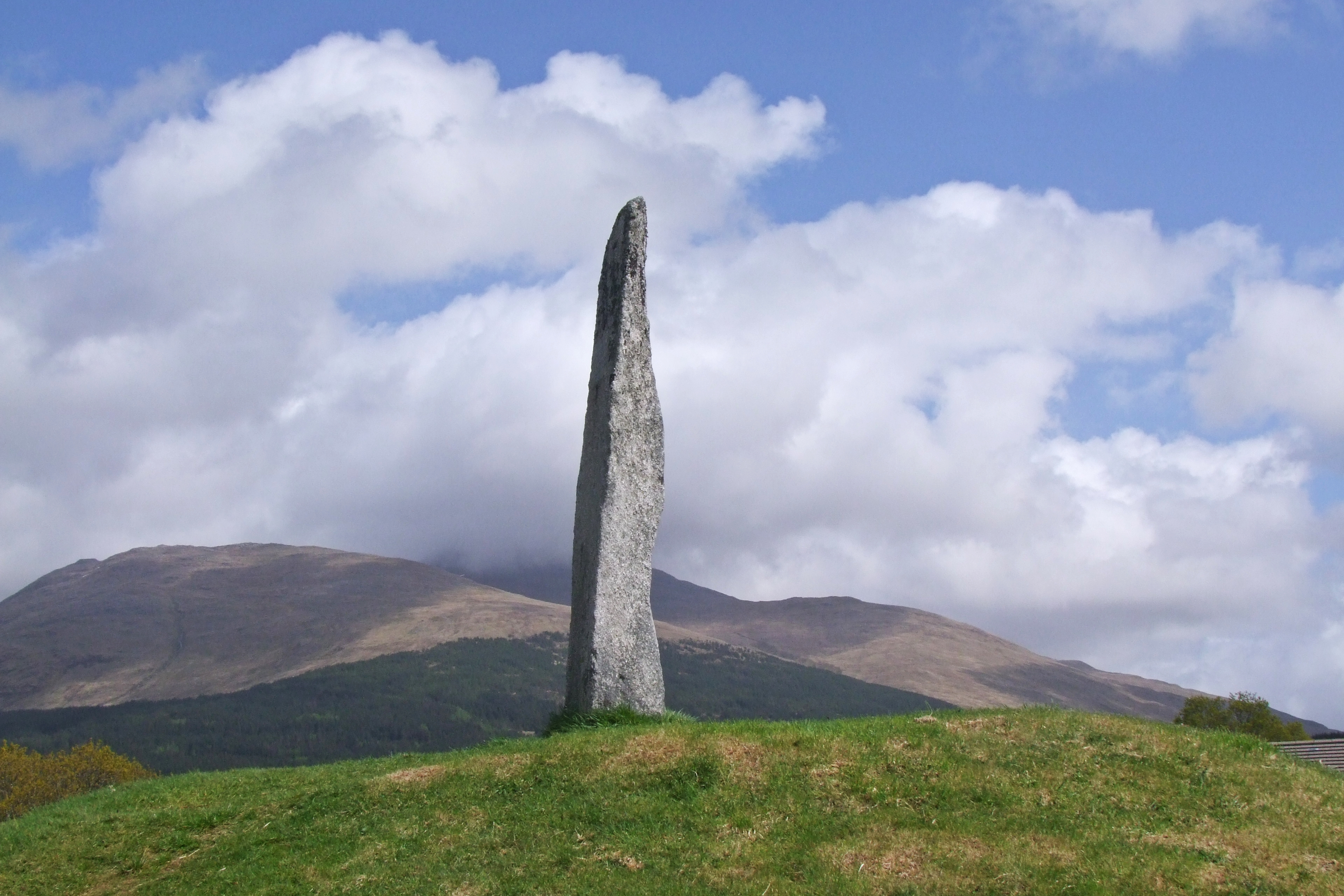
Nelson's Monument, Taynuilt, Scotland, is a standing stone, said to have been erected by villagers in 1805

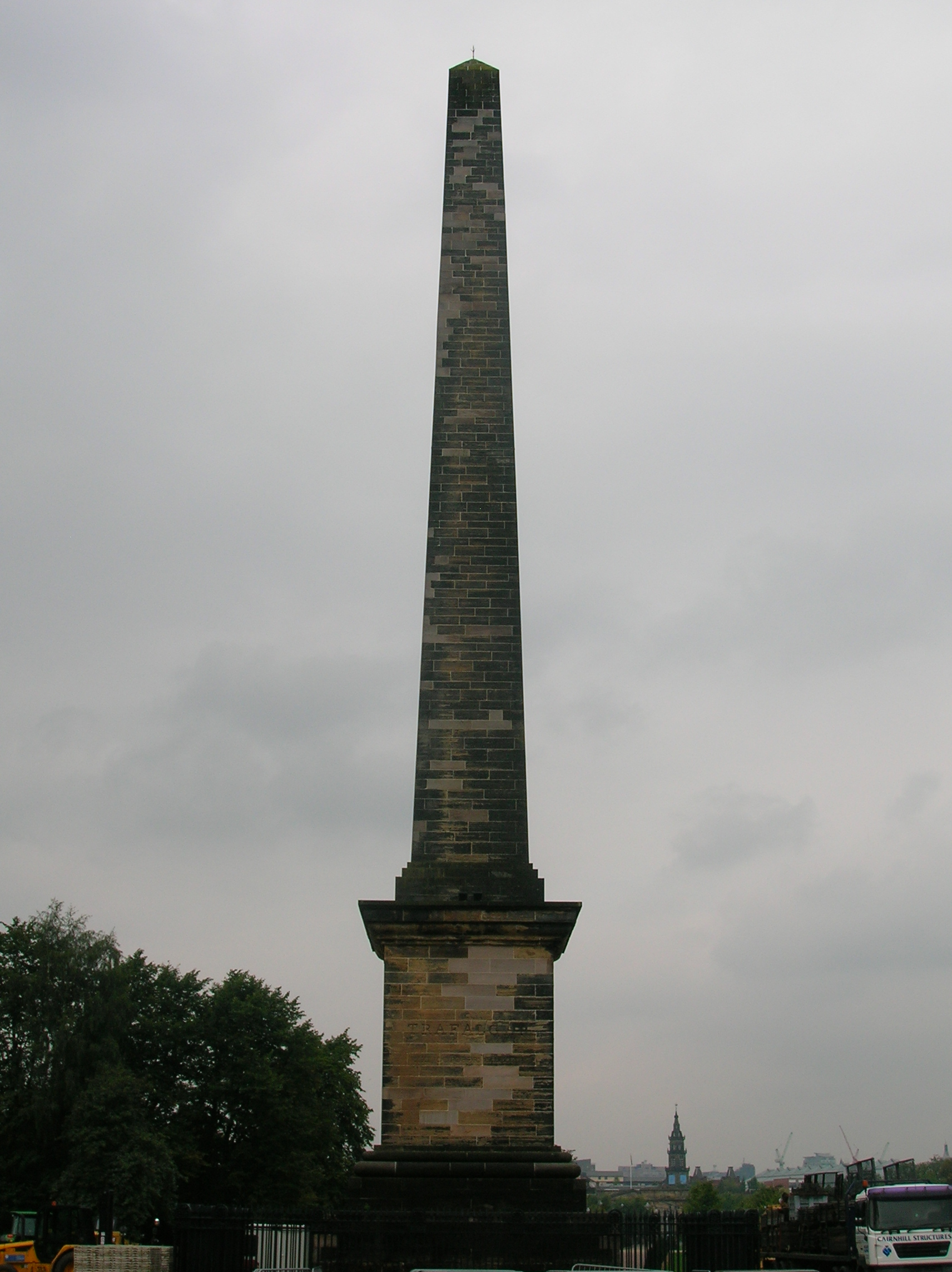
The Nelson Monument built on Glasgow Green in 1806 was the first major tribute in stone to the 'Hero of Trafalgar'.

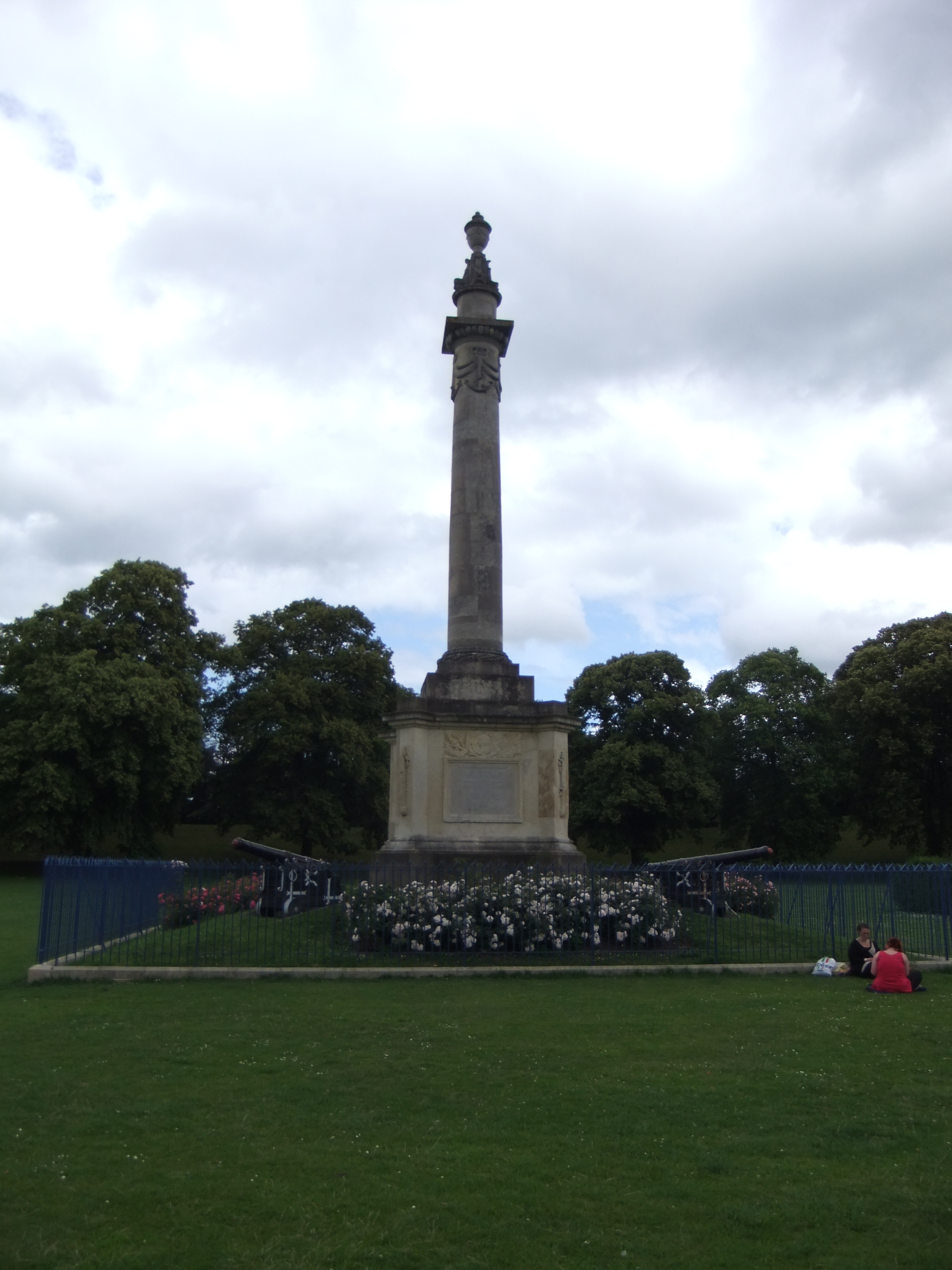
The Nelson Column at Castle Green, Hereford, designed by Thomas Hardwick, completed 1809

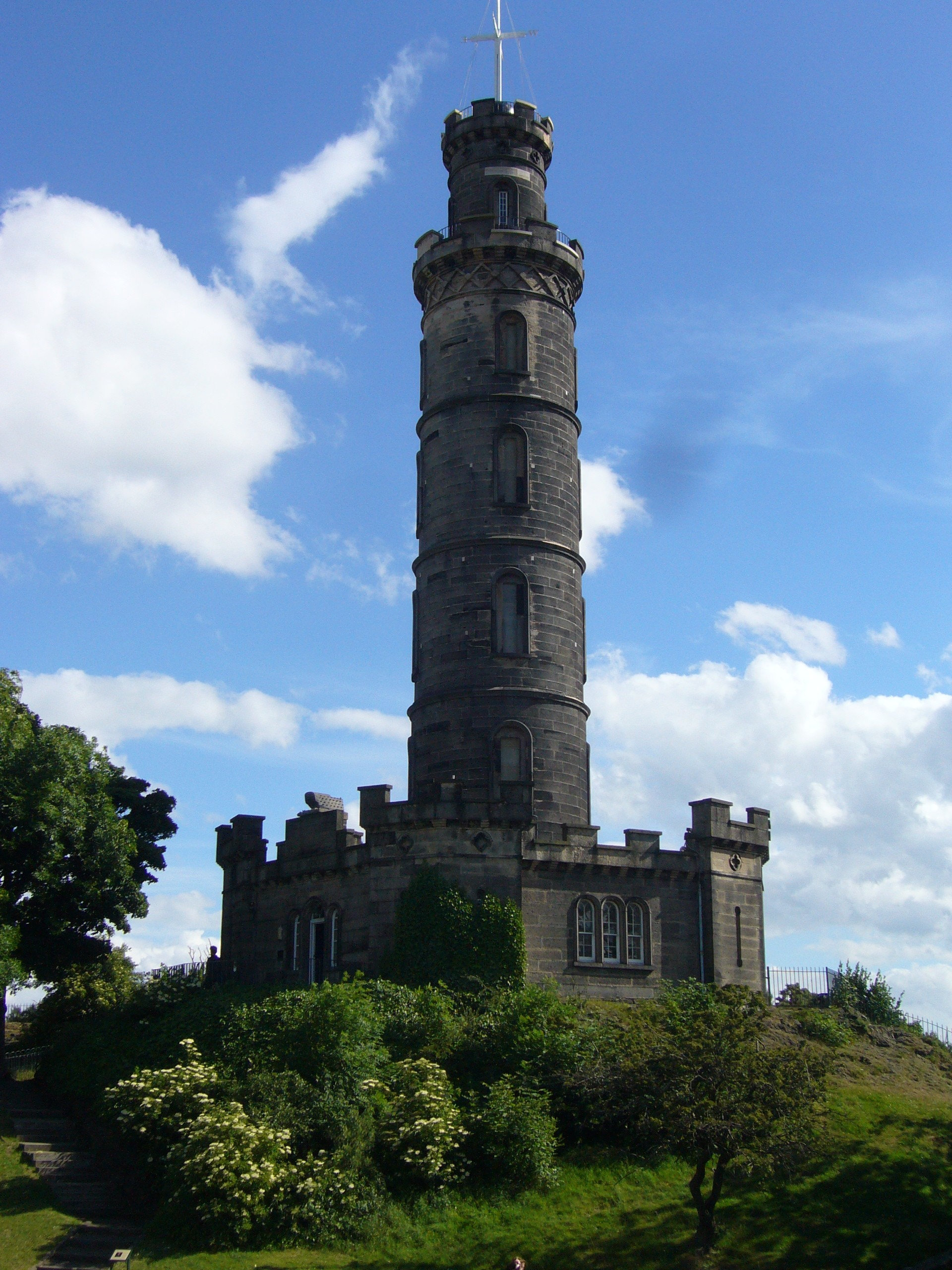
Monument to Nelson, paid for by public subscription and erected on the Calton Hill, Edinburgh; completed 1816

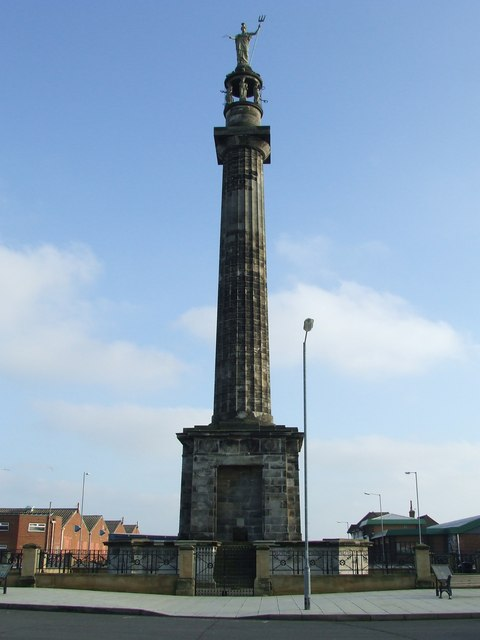
Nelson's Monument in Great Yarmouth, designed by William Wilkins, completed 1819

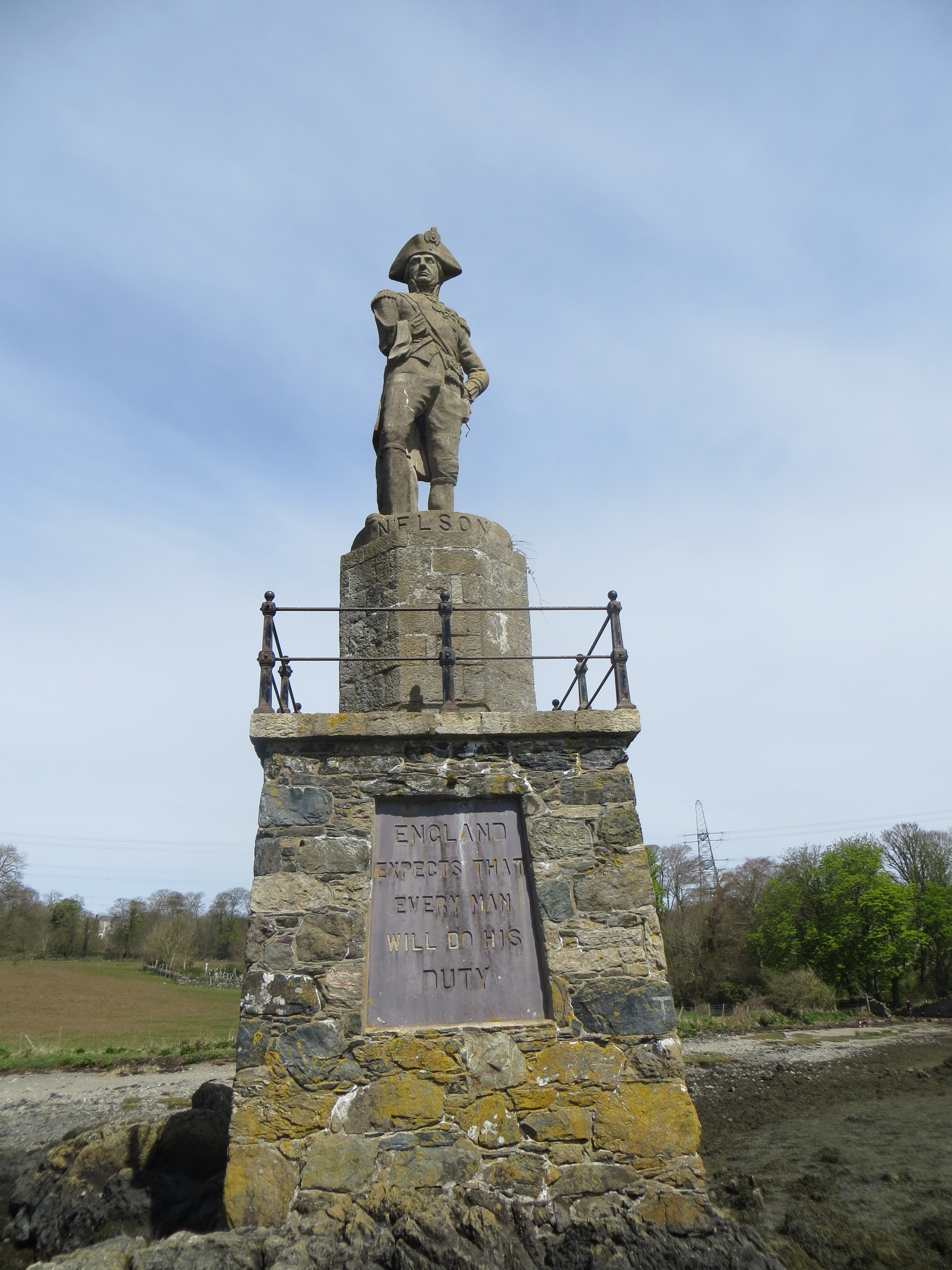
Nelson's Monument, Llanfairpwllgwyngyll, Wales, designed by Lord Clarence Paget, completed 1873

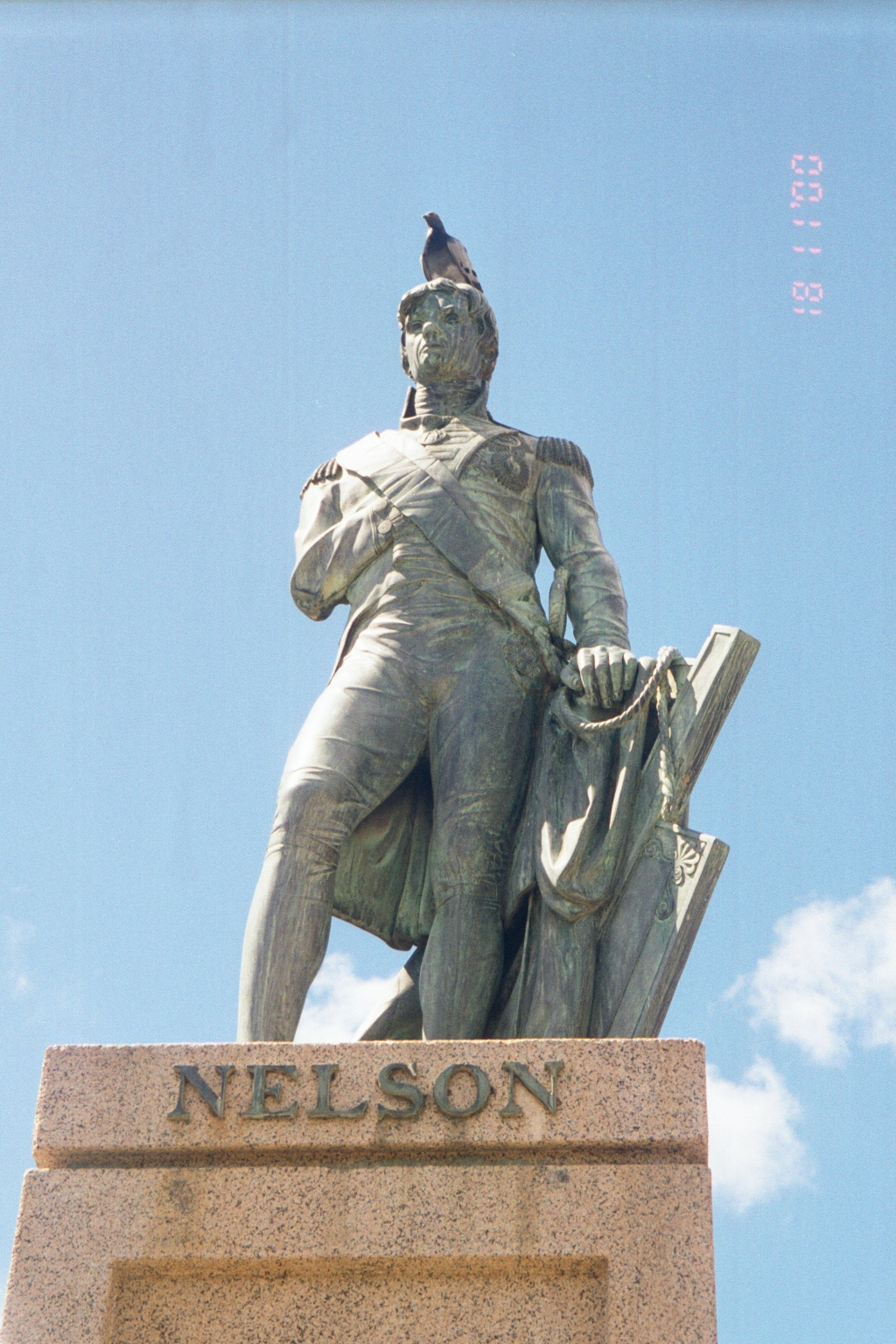
Lord Nelson's statue in Barbados, West Indies - November 2000 (close-up)
