= Nelson's Column (Montreal) =

Monument in Montreal, Quebec, Canada

- French: Colonne Nelson
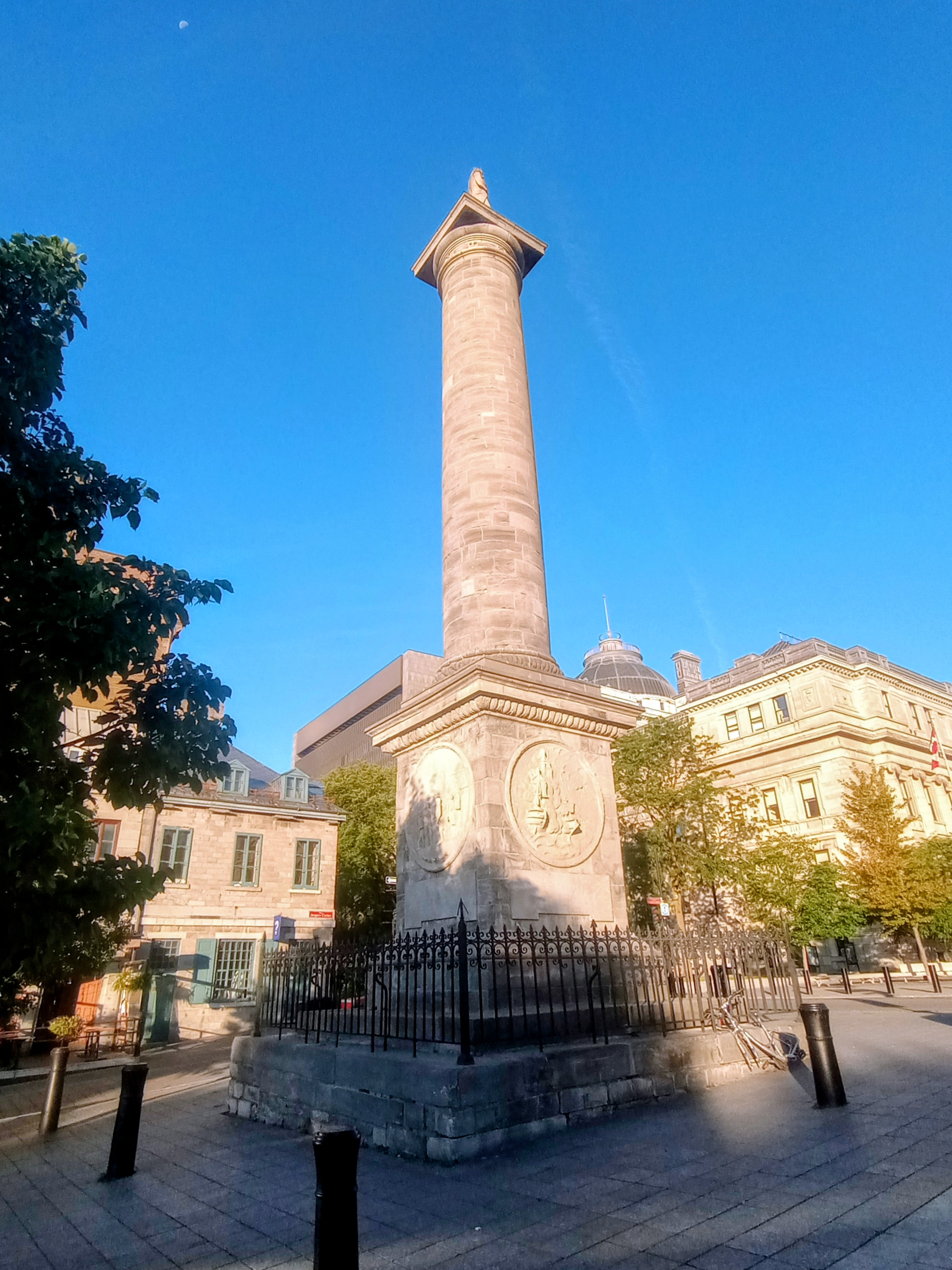
- Interactive map of Nelson's Column
- Location: Place Jacques-Cartier; Old Montreal
- Coordinates: 45°30′30″N 73°33′14″W
- Designer: Robert Mitchell
- Material: stone
- Height: 62 ft (19 m)
- Beginning date: 17 August 1809
- Dedicated to: Horatio Nelson

Nelson's Column (French: colonne Nelson) is a monument, designed by Scottish architect Robert Mitchell and erected in 1809 in Place Jacques-Cartier, Montreal, Quebec, Canada, which is dedicated to the memory of Admiral Horatio Nelson, following his death at the Battle of Trafalgar. Subsequent to the destruction of Nelson's Pillar in Dublin (1808–1966), Montreal's pillar now stands as the second-oldest "Nelson's Column" in the world, after the Nelson Monument in Glasgow. It is the city's oldest monument and the oldest war monument in Canada.

The public funds raised for building the monument were collected from both British and French Montrealers.

== History ==
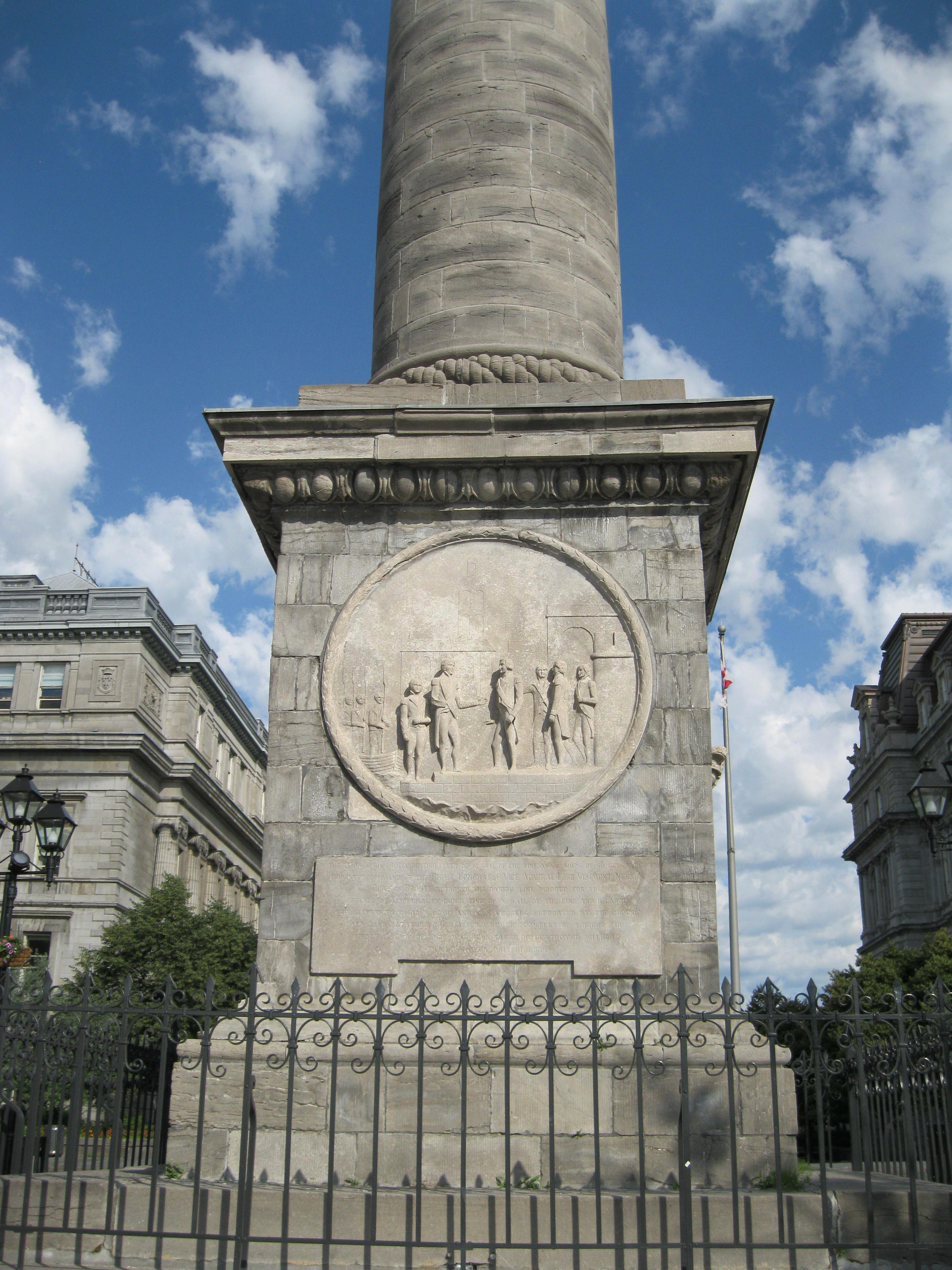
The west face of Nelson's Column

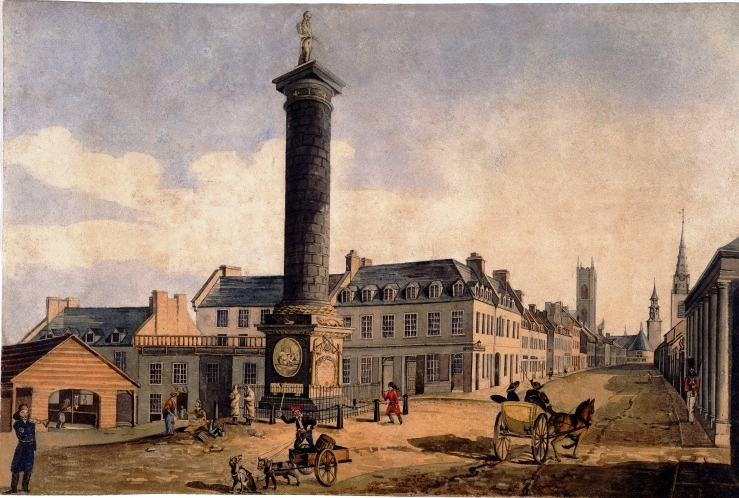
Nelson's Column and Notre Dame Street in 1830

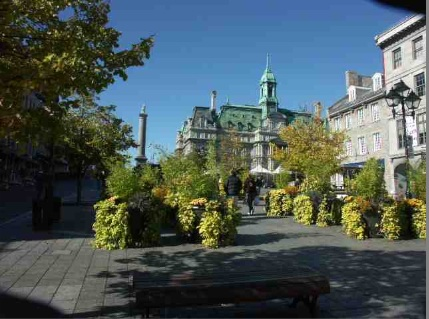
Nelson's Column as seen from Place Jacques-Cartier, 2005

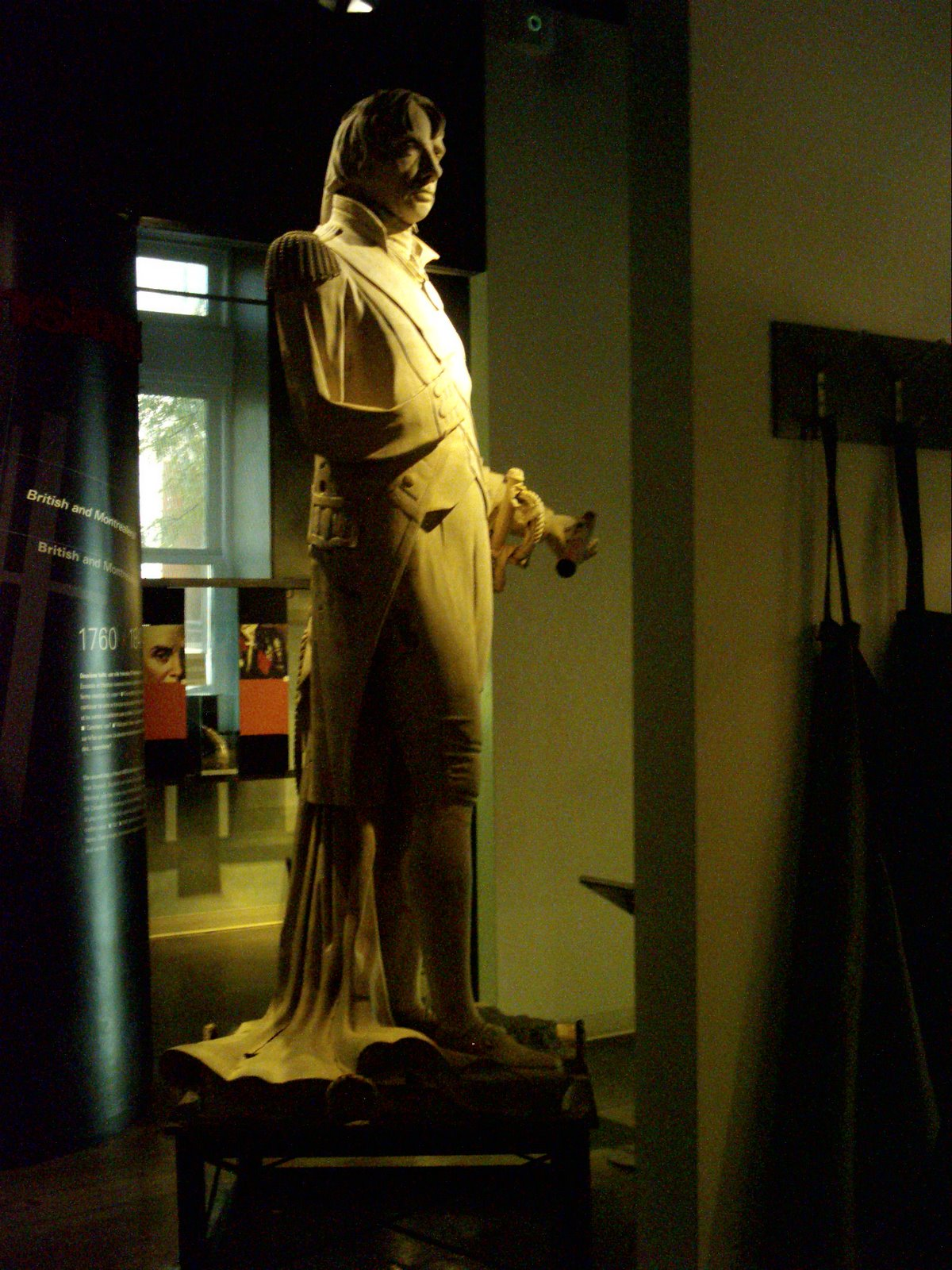
The original statue of Nelson, now at the Centre d'histoire de Montréal.

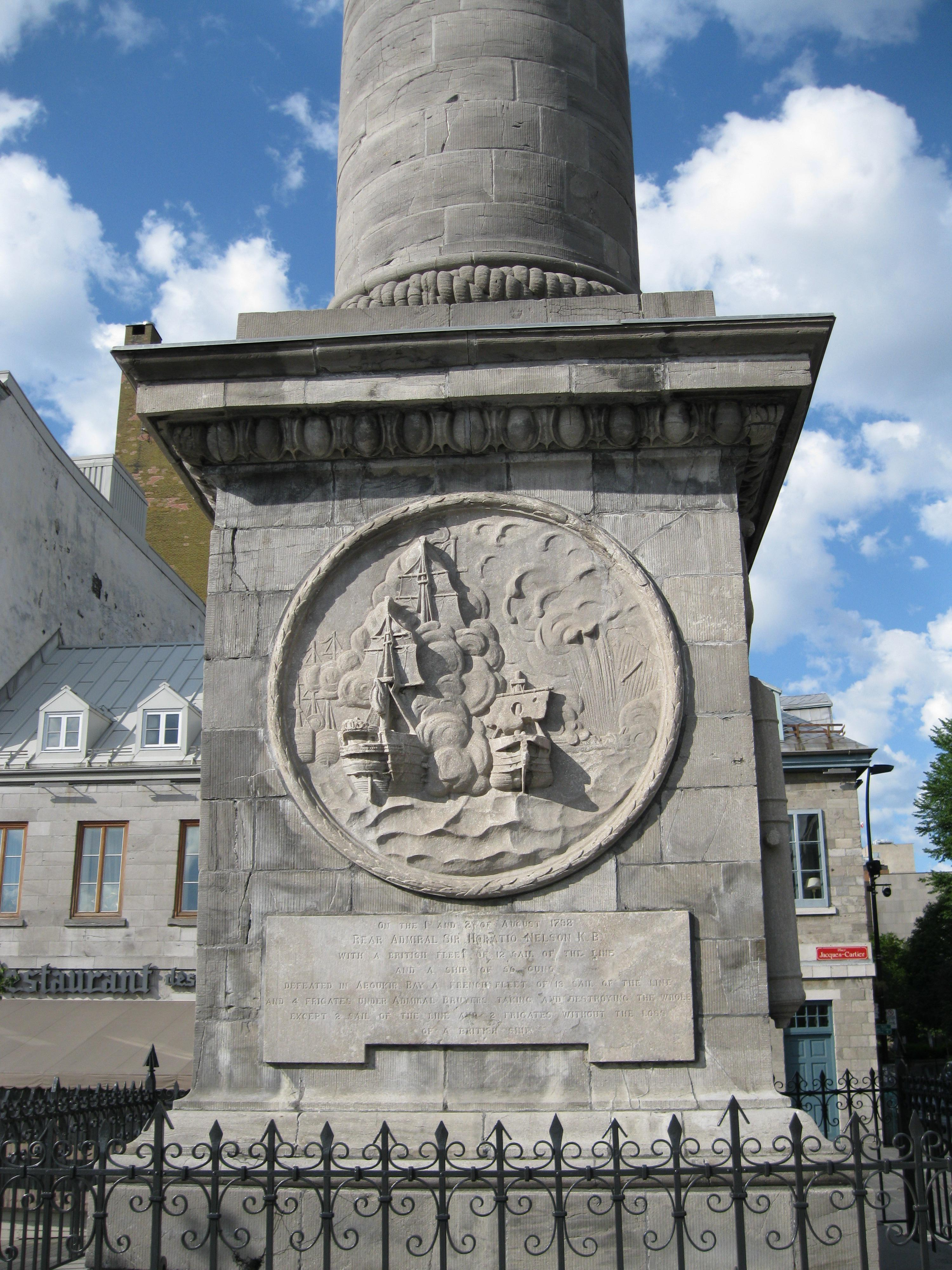
The east face of Nelson's Column

According to popular memory (and since repeated by Rumilly and Leacock), Montrealers first became aware of Nelson's death on a snowy New Year's Eve in 1805. As river navigation was closed for the winter, word reached Montreal overland via New York City, when a ball being hosted by Samuel Gerrard was interrupted by a messenger. Gerrard immediately went down to the Exchange Coffee House to publicly relay the news, while proposing that a monument be built to honour both Nelson's memory and his victory over Napoleon's fleet. A number of people subscribed on the spot and a subscription list was left open in the Old Court House, where over the following weeks further names were added.

In January 1806, a committee of five, consisting of John Richardson, Louis Chaboillez, John Forsyth, Sir James Monk, Sir John Johnson and John Ogilvie, was formed in conjunction with Sir Alexander Mackenzie, Thomas Forsyth and John Gillespie, in London, to raise public funds and organise the building of the monument. Among the principal contributors to the fund were Gerrard himself, Alain Chartier de Lotbinière, William McGillivray, members of the Panet family (including Jean-Antoine Panet), Joseph Frobisher, Jacques-Philippe Saveuse de Beaujeu, Alexander Henry, the Beaubien family, James McGill, the Fleury desChambault family, John Ogilvy and the "gentlemen of Saint-Sulpice". The Sulpicians, like many other French Canadians, strongly disapproved of the French Revolution and the subsequent Napoleonic regime, thereby regarding the destruction of Napoleon's navy at Trafalgar as "a triumph of virtue".

The magistrates of Montreal obtained from Governor Sir James Craig a plot of land that had a few years earlier constituted part of the formal gardens of the Château Vaudreuil, built in 1723 for Philippe de Rigaud, Marquis de Vaudreuil. The Chateau burned down in 1803 and the space formerly occupied by the gardens had been turned into a public square, known as New Market Place, before being renamed for Jacques Cartier in 1847.

The committee had contracted the firm of Coade & Sealy in London to design and build an "amazing" monument that would withstand all weather. The column was made of grey compact limestone, while the statue and ornaments were made using the firm's own invention, Coade stone. It was shipped in parts to Montreal, arriving in April 1808. William Gilmore, a local stonemason who had contributed £7 towards its construction, was then hired to assemble its seventeen parts and the foundation base was laid on 17 August 1809. General Sir Gordon Drummond had supplied eight pieces of cannon to support the iron chain which had been originally placed around the base. The final cost of the column amounted to just under £1,300. The masonry came to £523; the ornaments, £468.12; the design, estimate and plans, £58; the iron railings £66.18.11.

The Montreal pillar has been described as the first monumental column to be raised to Nelson anywhere in the world, or at least anywhere in the British Empire. In fact, construction of Dublin's Nelson's Pillar had been completed with the addition of Nelson's statue toward the end of August or in early September 1809, whereas work on erecting the Montreal Column had just begun on 17 August. Dublin at that time was not only within the British Empire but also within the recently created United Kingdom of Great Britain and Ireland. The Dublin Pillar had also been financed by public subscription. It was destroyed by Irish republican extremists on 8 March 1966.

The Horatio Nelson statue that originally stood atop Nelson's column in Place Jacques Cartier was relocated to the Montreal History Museum in 1997 for preservation. A copy now stands atop the column in its place.

== Rededication ceremony, 1900 ==
In October 1900, a rededication ceremony took place at the column following its restoration. The speakers represented several of Montreal's ethnic communities. Louis François Georges Baby, a representative of an old French-Canadian family descended from Jacques Babie, told those gathered that the monument had originally been raised through contributions from both the British and French communities in Montreal. Another speaker, Henri Césaire Saint-Pierre, claimed that the original idea had been a French-Canadian one, as suggested by 'Girard', referring to Samuel Gerrard, who was in fact an Anglo-Irishman. Saint-Pierre continued, stating that the monument stood as a lesson for "duty performed", irrespective of nationality. Other speakers were Judge Curran who represented the Irish community, and Lord Strathcona who represented the Scots-Quebecers.

== Controversy ==
The monument is controversial among some French Canadians in Montreal, who perceive it as offensive due to lingering tensions between English Canada and French Canada. In 1890, a group of Quebec nationalists unsuccessfully plotted to blow up the monument. Four decades later in 1930, French-Canadian inhabitants of Montreal erected a statue of French Navy officer Jean Vauquelin in a nearby city square (which was subsequently named after him) in response to the continued presence of the monument. In 1997, the Montreal City Council proposed moving the monument to a nearby district inhabited predominantly by English-speaking Quebecers, but local opposition prevented the proposal from being enacted.

== Other monuments to Nelson ==
- 1806: The first civic monument to be erected was a 44-metre high obelisk, the Nelson Monument, on Glasgow Green in Glasgow, Scotland.
- 1806: Nelson's Tower in Forres, Moray.
- 1808: Nelson's Pillar in Dublin, Ireland, was destroyed by a bomb in 1966.
- 1809: Statue of Horatio Nelson, Birmingham by Richard Westmacott, in the Bull Ring.
- 1809: A column, topped with a decorative urn, in the Castle Green, Hereford. A statue was planned in place of the urn but insufficient money was raised.
- 1813: A much shorter statue of Lord Nelson in Trafalgar Square, Bridgetown, Barbados is older than its taller and more famous counterpart in London.
- 1807–1815: Nelson Monument, Edinburgh, is a tower on top of Calton Hill.
- 1819: The Britannia Monument at Great Yarmouth is a 144-feet-high doric column topped by a statue of Britannia.
- 1840–1843: Nelson's Column in London.
- 1853: Nelson's Needle on top Portsdown Hill, Portsmouth; paid for by the company of HMS Victory after arriving home.

== Gallery ==
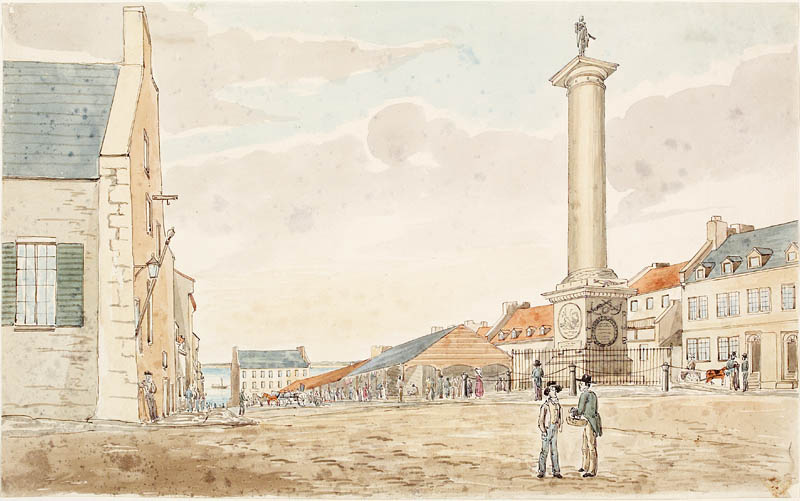
Nelson's Monument and Market Place, Montreal, Quebec, 20 July 1829.

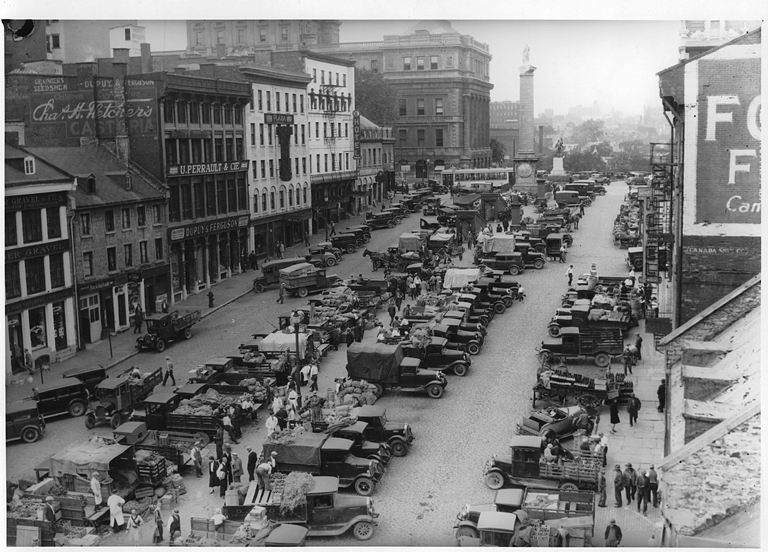
In 1930

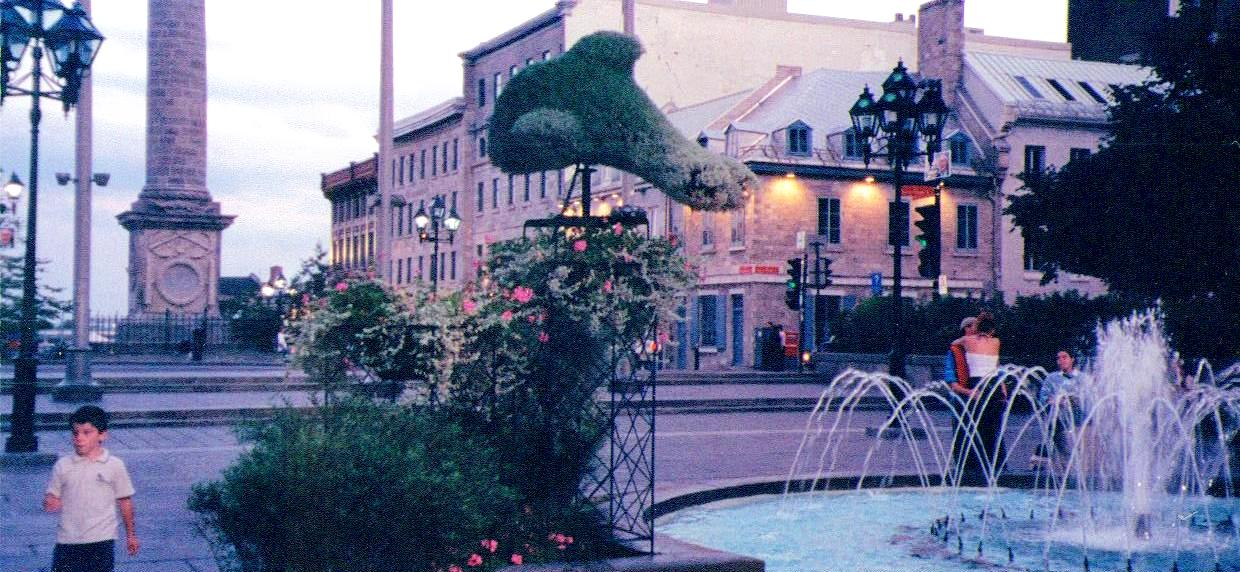
Place Jacques-Cartier

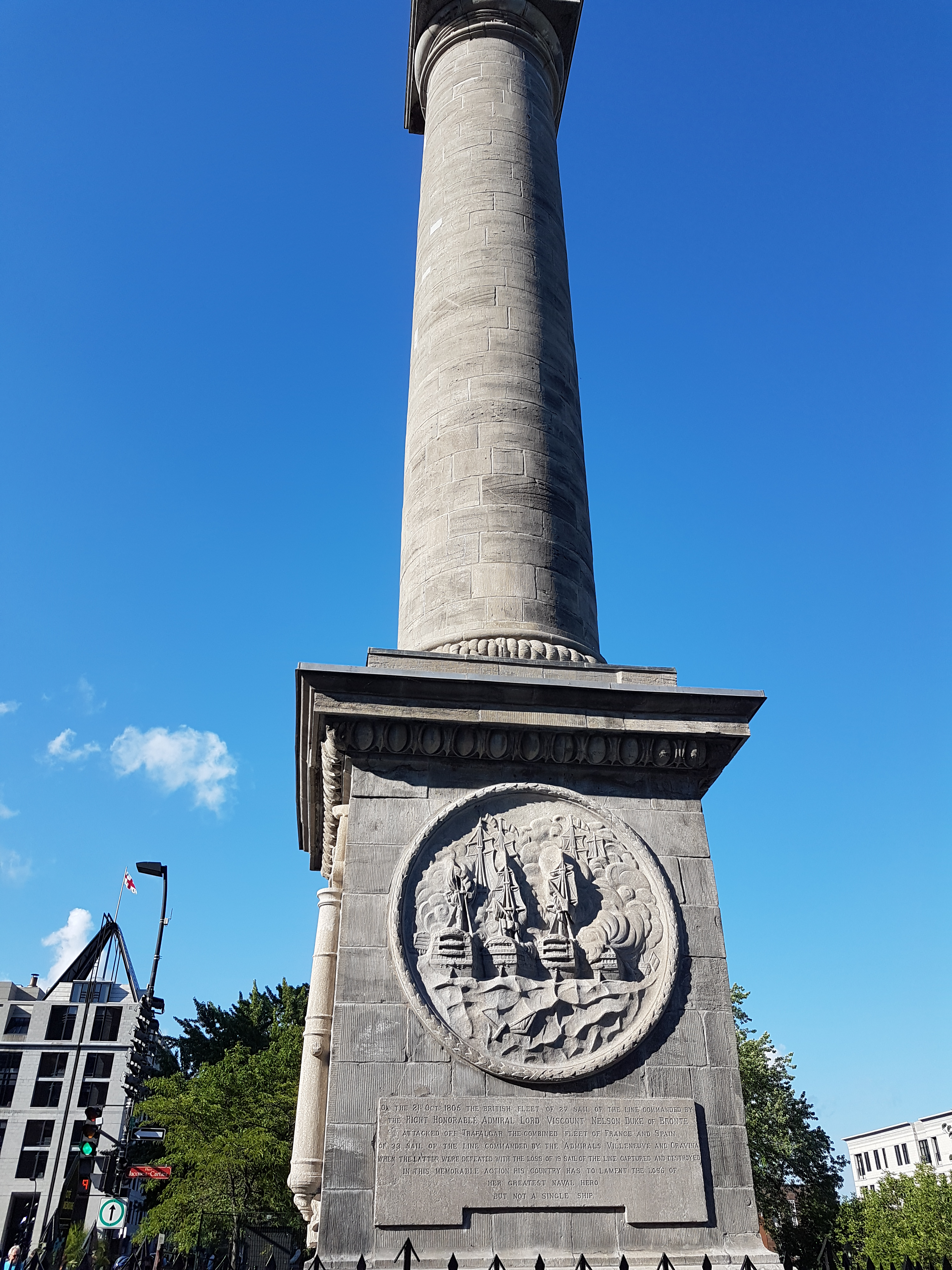
The South face of the column with a brief description of Nelson's final naval battle and death in 1805.

== See also ==
- Timeline of Montreal history
- Monuments and memorials to Horatio Nelson, 1st Viscount Nelson
