= HMS Diana (1757) =

Frigate of the Royal Navy

History

Great Britain
- Name: HMS Diana
- Ordered: 1 June 1756
- Builder: Robert Batson, Limehouse
- Laid down: June 1756
- Launched: 30 August 1757
- Completed: 12 September 1757 at Deptford Dockyard
- Commissioned: August 1757
- Fate: Sold to break up at Deptford, 16 May 1793

General characteristics
- Class & type: Southampton-class fifth-rate frigate
- Tons burthen: 668 57/94 bm
- Length: 124 ft 6 in (37.95 m) (gundeck); 103 ft 1.125 in (31.42298 m) (keel)
- Beam: 34 ft 11 in (10.64 m)
- Depth of hold: 12 ft 0 in (3.66 m)
- Sail plan: Full-rigged ship
- Complement: 210 officers and men
- Armament: 32 guns comprising; Upperdeck: 26 × 12-pounder guns; Quarterdeck: 4 × 6-pounder guns; Forecastle: 2 × 6-pounder guns

HMS Diana was one of the four 32-gun Southampton-class fifth-rate frigates of the Royal Navy. She was launched in 1757. In 1760, at the Battle of Neuville she and HMS Vanguard pursued and sank two French frigates, Atlante, commanded by Jean Vauquelin, and Pomone; Diana took on board the important prisoners. Later, she served through the American Revolutionary War.

== Career ==
In 1792 there was civil war in San Domingo between the white and black inhabitants. Captain Thomas McNamara Russell of Diana, on a relief mission to the authorities on Saint-Domingue, received the intelligence that John Perkins, a mulatto (mixed-race) British former naval officer from Jamaica, was under arrest and due to be executed in Jérémie for supplying arms to the rebel slaves. Britain and France were not at war and Russell requested that the French release Perkins. The French authorities promised that they would, but didn't. After the exchange of numerous letters, Russell decided that the French were not going to release Perkins. Russell then sailed around Cap-Français to Jérémie and met with Ferret. Russell and Captain Nowell, of Ferret, decided that Nowell's first lieutenant, an officer named Godby, would go ashore and recover Perkins whilst the two ships remained offshore within cannon shot, ready to deploy a landing party if need be. Lieutenant Godby landed and after negotiations the French released Perkins.

== Fate ==
The "Principal Officers and Commissioners of His Majesty's Navy" offered the hull of "Diana, Burthen 668 Tons" for sale at Deptford on 16 May 1793. The purchasers had to post a bond of £2000 that they would break her up in a limited time.
