= Battle of Pointe-aux-Trembles =

1760 battle of the French and Indian War

- Part of the conquest of New France
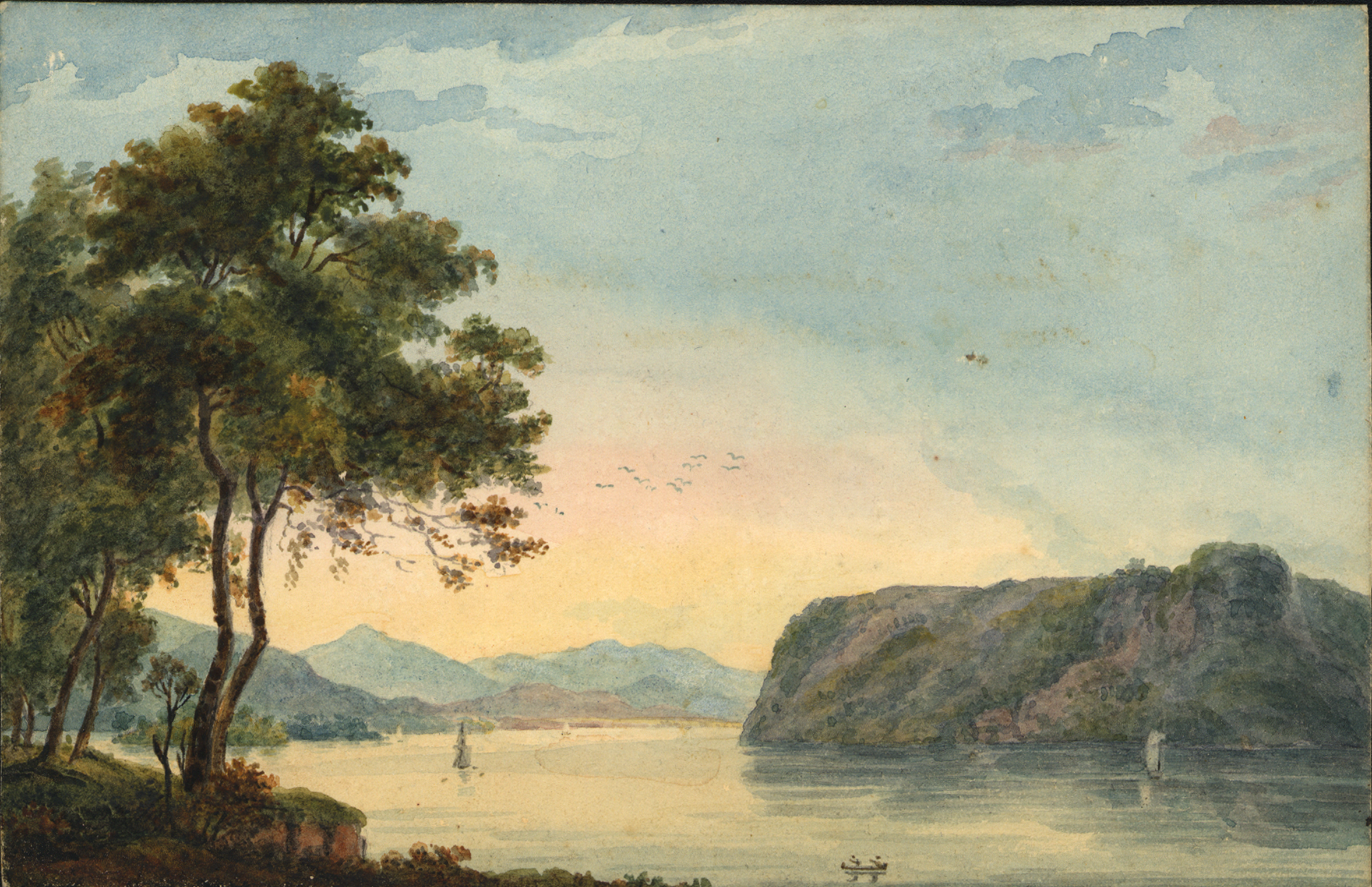
- 18th-century illustration of the Saint Lawrence River
Date	16 May 1760
Location	Saint Lawrence River 46.4200°N 71.5833°W
Result	British victory

Belligerents
Great Britain	France

Commanders and leaders
Robert Swanton	Jean Vauquelin (surrendered)

Strength
1 ship of the line; 2 frigates	2 frigates; 2 schooners; 2 armed ships

Casualties and losses
Unknown	1 frigate destroyed; 1 frigate captured; 2 schooners captured; 2 armed ships captured

The Battle of Pointe-aux-Trembles was a naval and land engagement during the conquest of New France that took place on 16 May 1760 on the north shore of the Saint Lawrence River, near the future site of Neuville, Quebec, Canada. In the previous September, the British had occupied the city of Quebec in New France, and starting in April a French force had been besieging the city. A relief force of the Royal Navy, having forced a passage through ice up the Saint Lawrence River, destroyed the French ships led by Jean Vauquelin that were assisting in the siege. The British victory forced the French under Chevalier de Lévis to raise the siege and to end their attempts to retake Quebec City.

== Background ==
After the capture of Quebec in 1759, the defeated French forces collected on the Jacques-Cartier River west of the city. Pack ice had closed the mouth of the Saint Lawrence River, forcing the British Royal Navy to leave shortly after. The Chevalier de Lévis, General Montcalm's successor as French commander, marched his 7,000 troops to Quebec and besieged it. During that harsh winter, James Murray, the British commander, had lost numerous troops to illness, for instance, scurvy had reduced his garrison to only 4,000 men.

On 28 April 1760, Lévis's forces met and defeated the British at the Battle of Sainte-Foy, immediately west of the city, but the British were able to withdraw within the walls of Quebec. British improvements to the fortifications combined with the lack of French heavy artillery and ammunition, preventing them from quickly retaking the city. A siege by Lévis began but the success of the French army's offensive against Quebec in the spring of 1760 depended on the arrival of a French armada, with fresh troops and supplies. The British too were anxious to get a war fleet into the Saint Lawrence River in the spring before supplies and reinforcements could arrive from France.

On 9 May, a ship arrived off Pointe-Lévis; the French broke into shouts of Vive le roi!, believing the ship to be theirs. The anxious British expected the worst. But the ship was HMS Lowestoffe, detached from a squadron under Lord Colville who were just outside the Saint Lawrence River, ready to force the passage themselves. When the ship conducted a twenty-one-gun salute and hoisted the Union flag, British fears turned to sudden joy. Lévis and the French were in despair and tried to bombard Quebec into submission before the main British force arrived. Although the heavy bombardment damaged the city's walls, casualties were light. The bombardment expressed Lévis's frustration, as he knew he could not take the city without naval support. Colville's ships were soon navigating up the Saint Lawrence already made easy by James Cook's mapping the previous year.

== Battle ==
During the night of 15 to 16 May, Lévis was informed of the appearance of two British vessels between Île d'Orléans and Pointe-Lévis. Dishearteningly, he immediately sent orders to the French vessels transporting the supplies of his army to retire and to his two frigates to be on alert and to be also ready to retire. Bad weather caused his orders to the vessels to be delayed. On 16 May at daybreak, in response to the expressed wishes of Murray, Commodore Robert Swanton gave orders to HMS Diana and HMS Lowestoffe, soon followed by HMS Vanguard, to pass the town and to attack the French vessels in the river above.

At 5 a.m, the six French vessels (two frigates escorting the two smaller armed ships and two schooners which served as the transport vessels), commanded by Captain Jean Vauquelin, had set sail when the British vessels appeared. The French vessels immediately cut their cables; Pomone in the confusion forced herself too close to shore and ran aground. The two British frigates meanwhile sailed past blasting away at her but instead of stopping, they ignored her and pursued Atalante, which joined the French transport vessels at Cap-Rouge. Atalante's commander, seeing that the British frigates were catching up with the French transport vessels, ordered them to beach so that Lévis could salvage the provisions they transported. Atalante then sailed upstream but was forced to run aground at Neuville, then called Pointe-aux-Trembles.

Vauquelin had managed to turn Atalante to broadside to fight it out. He nailed his colours to the mast and engaged the two frigates that had pursued him. Vauquelin did not belie his reputation and fought his ship for two hours with persistent bravery until his ammunition was spent. He even refused to strike his flag, and it was only when his ship was a burning, dismasted hulk that he was made prisoner; he was treated by the British with distinguished honour. Meanwhile, Vanguard did not sail farther than Saint-Michel and returned to Anse-au-Foulon and in so doing enfiladed the French trenches with grapeshot, forcing their abandonment. Vanguard then sailed back to Quebec to round up the beached French ships, taking prisoners and their stores. After the engagement, the two British frigates remained at Neuville.

== Aftermath ==
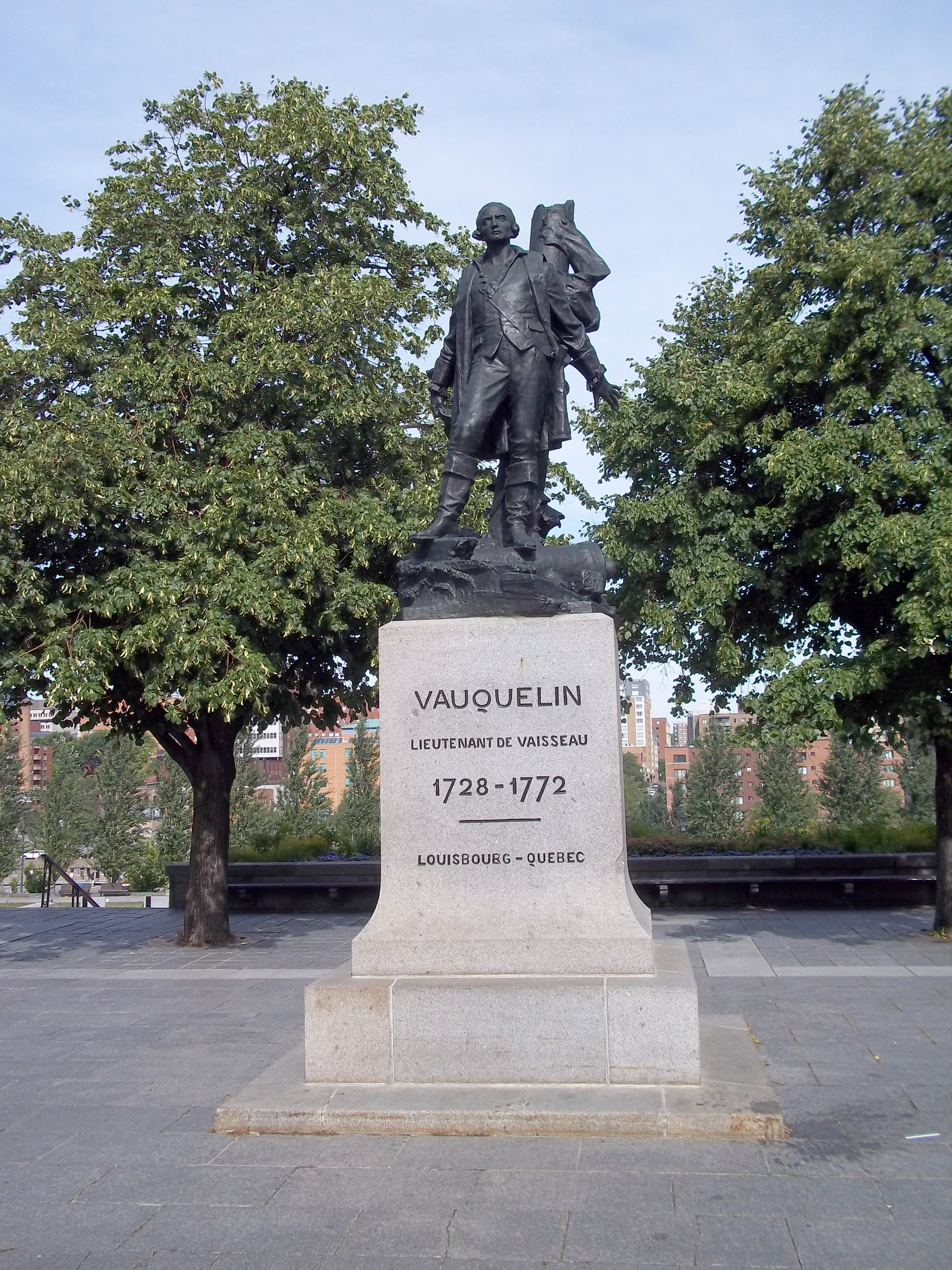
Statue of Jean Vauquelin in Vauquelin Square, Montreal

The destruction of the French vessels was a death blow to the hopes of Lévis, who thus lost his stores of food and ammunition. Lévis resolved to wait for the night before he retired, and he then hastened to raise the siege, leaving behind him the whole of his material for the siege and his sick and wounded. He also gave orders to throw his artillery down the cliff near Anse-au-Foulon and to distribute provisions to the troops. At 10 p.m., the army marched with the cannon having been sent forward. Deserters from Lévis's camp then told Murray that the French were in full retreat on which all the British batteries opened fire at random through the darkness and sending cannonballs en ricochet, bowling by scores together, over the Plains of Abraham on the heels of the retreating French army. The British naval presence was reinforced on 18 May with the arrival of Lord Colville's squadron. Lowestoffe ran aground a few days later because of strong currents, and the damage sustained in the battle left her a wreck.

At the Battle of Quiberon Bay, just off the coast of France, the Royal Navy destroyed the French fleet and so France could not send a significant reserve force to save New France. A small French relief fleet, commanded by François-Chenard Giraudais, managed to get through the British blockade but did not attempt to go up the Saint Lawrence River when he learned that the British had preceded him. Giraudais was later defeated in the Bay of Chaleur at the Battle of Restigouche. With Quebec City secure, it became a staging point for the conquest of the remainder of Canada. Montreal, the last major French stronghold of which Lévis's forces had retreated to was now the target. Forces under Jeffery Amherst approached on 8 September 1760. Lévis was ordered by Governor Marquis de Vaudreuil to surrender the city, which he soon did.

== Bibliography ==
- Baugh, Daniel (2014). The Global Seven Years War 1754–1763: Britain and France in a Great Power Contest. Routledge. ISBN 9781317895466.
- Beatson, Robert (1804). Naval and Military Memoirs of Great Britain, from 1727 to 1783, Volume 2. Longman, Hurst, Rees and Orme.
- Eccles, W. J. (1969). The Canadian Frontier, 1534–1760. New York: Holt, Rinehart and Winston. ISBN 0-03-076540-4.
- Francis, R. Douglas; Jones, Richard & Smith, Donald B. (2000). Origins: Canadian History to Confederation. Toronto: Harcourt Canada. ISBN 0-7747-3664-X.
- Parkman, Francis (2009). Montcalm and Wolfe: The French and Indian War. BiblioLife. ISBN 978-1117791340.
- Manning, Stephen (2009). Quebec: The Story of Three Sieges. Continuum. ISBN 978-0773538719.
- Suthren, Victor (2000). To Go Upon Discovery: James Cook and Canada, from 1758 to 1779. Dundurn. ISBN 9781459713062.
