= Exchange Coffee House, Montreal =

Coordinates: 45°30′12″N 73°33′23″W

Located at the corner of St. Pierre and St. Paul streets and first known as the "City Tavern," kept by Robert Tesseyman, this 19th-century hotel in Montreal, Quebec, Canada, was a popular meeting place of the Beaver Club before later becoming the Exchange Coffee House. In 1805, Samuel Gerrard proposed building Nelson's Column, Montreal here. The hotel was a common place of rest for transient travellers and Upper Canada merchants. It became the location of the first stock transactions in Montreal.

== Time Line ==
- 1832 – The hotel becomes the location of the first stock transactions to take place in Montreal, and perhaps Canada.
- 1874 – The Montreal Stock Exchange becomes Chartered after more than 40 years of informal trading, mostly in railroad and bank securities.
- 1883 – The Exchange moves to the Commodities Exchange building on St. Sacrament Street. Trading hours are from 10:45 a.m. to 3:00 p.m.
- 1904 – The Exchange moves into its own building, at 453 St. François-Xavier Street in Old Montreal. Today home to the Centaur Theatre, this building was designed by architect George B. Post who also designed the New York Stock Exchange Building.
