= Vauquelin Square =

Urban square

- French: place Vauquelin
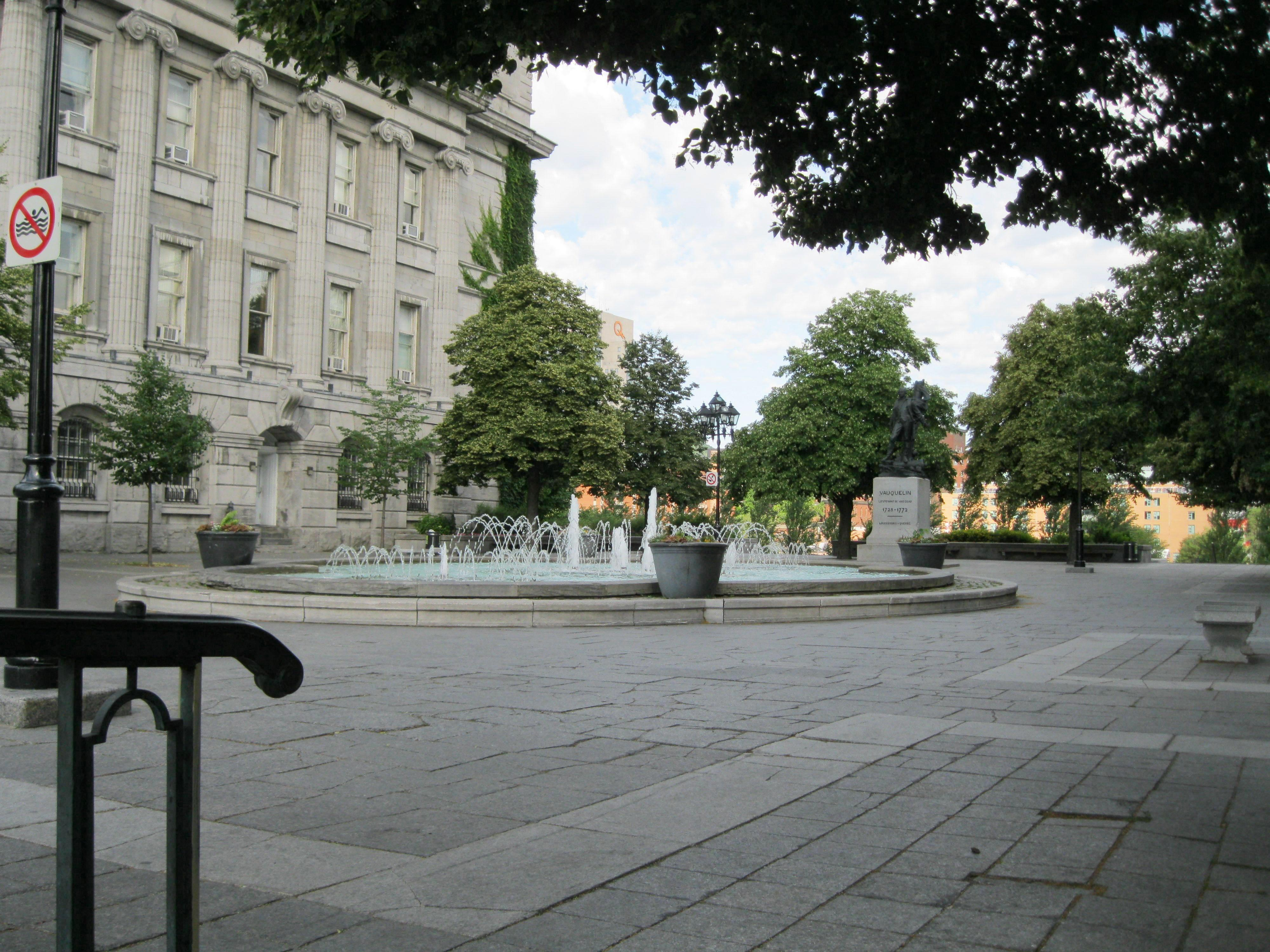
- The fountain at Vauquelin Square

- Location within Montreal
- Type: Town square
- Location: Old Montreal, Ville-Marie Montreal, Quebec, Canada
- Coordinates: 45°30′30″N 73°33′16″W
- Created: 1858
- Operator: City of Montreal
- Status: Open all year

Vauquelin Square (officially in French: Place Vauquelin) is a small urban square located in Old Montreal.

== Overview ==
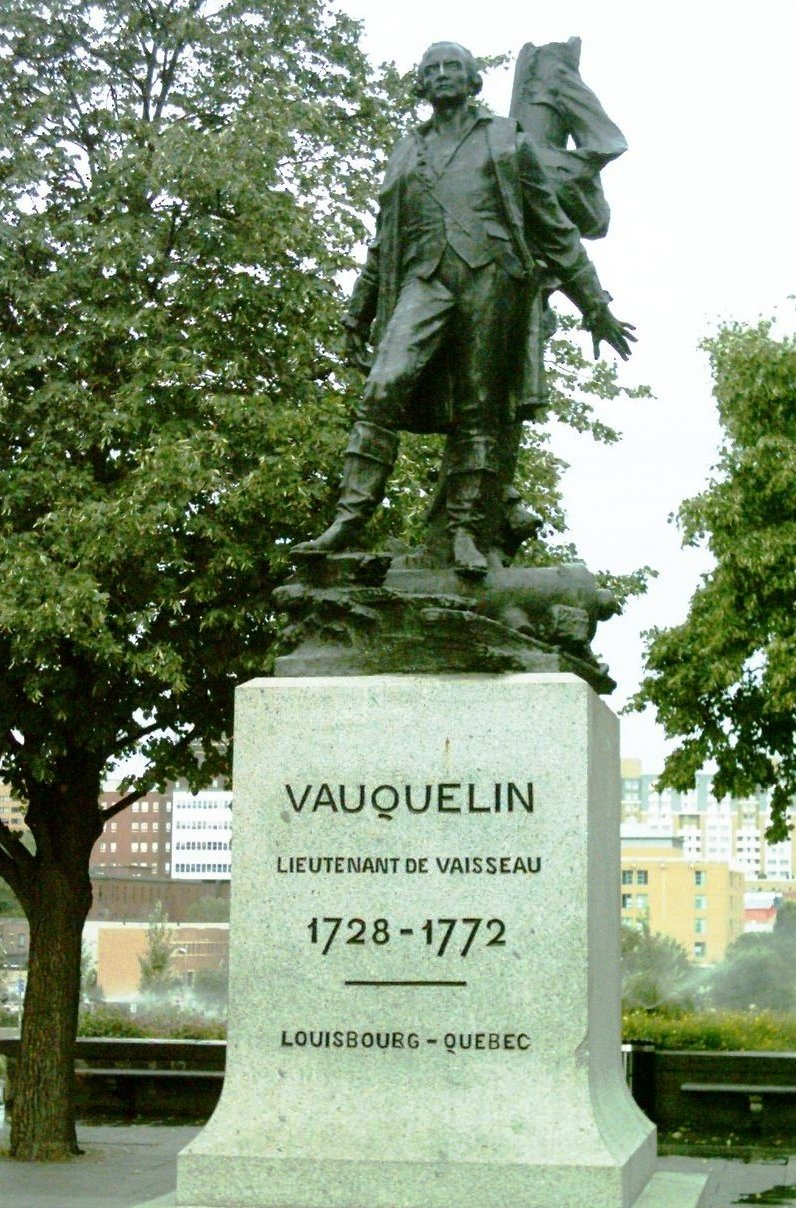
The statue of Jean Vauquelin

The square was a part of the fief given in 1658 to Lambert Closse and ceded to the Jesuits in 1692. It passed to the Crown in 1763 and was the site of the old prison until 1836. In 1846, the government of Lower Canada took over the prison and demolished it in 1850 so that it could build a new courthouse.

The demolition of the old city jail freed up the space on the east side of the new courthouse. In 1858, that land was used to create a square called "Neptune Square". At its centre, a fountain was built featuring a statue of Neptune, God of the Sea. In 1895, the square was given an additional structure for a newspaper stand.

In 1902, the city of Montreal rented the land at the annual rate of one dollar. In 1924, following the reconstruction of City Hall, the square was renamed "City Hall Square" for a short time. Six years later, following a public subscription, the square was renamed Vauquelin Square and a statue of Jean Vauquelin, created by Paul-Eugène Benet, was erected within it. It was unveiled on June 22, 1930. Vauquelin was a captain in the French navy who distinguished himself during the Siege of Louisbourg and the Battle of Neuville during the Seven Years' War. The monument is 6.8 metres (22 ft) high; the statue itself is 2.8 metres (9.2 ft) high.

On June 5, 1933, then-mayor Fernand Rinfret unveiled a plaque to commemorate Jacques Viger, the city's first mayor.

In 1966, the square was refurbished into its current shape and the monument was moved slightly further north. Until then, vehicular traffic had been permitted on either side of the statue between Notre Dame Street and the Champ-de-Mars. Additional changes were made to the square in 1984.

In 2017, the Vauquelin square was reinaugurated following a restoration by Lemay for the 375th anniversary of Montreal, resulting in a redeveloped fountain and pool, urban furniture integration, planted trees, lighting and other landscape components.

== Gallery ==
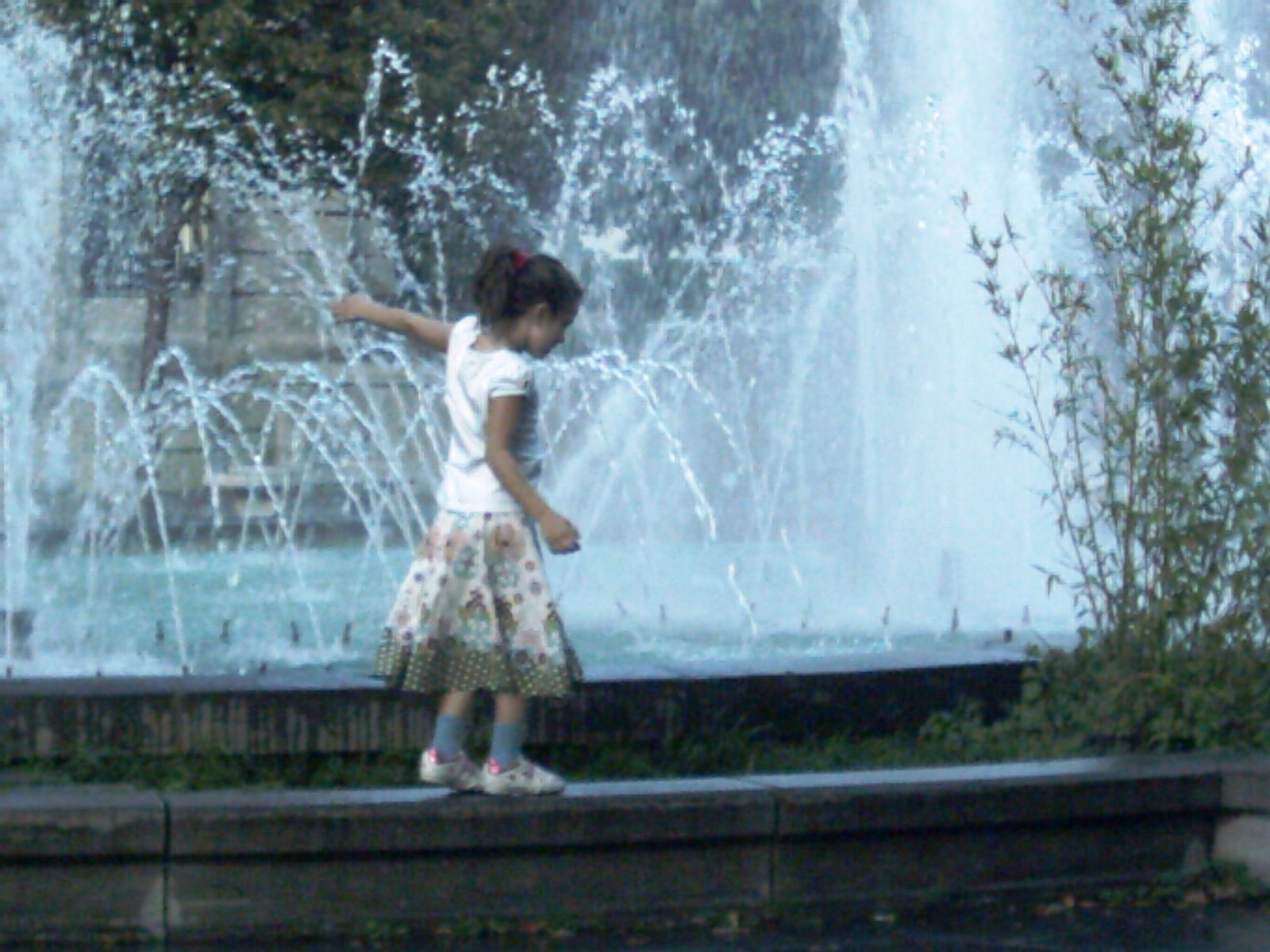
The fountain

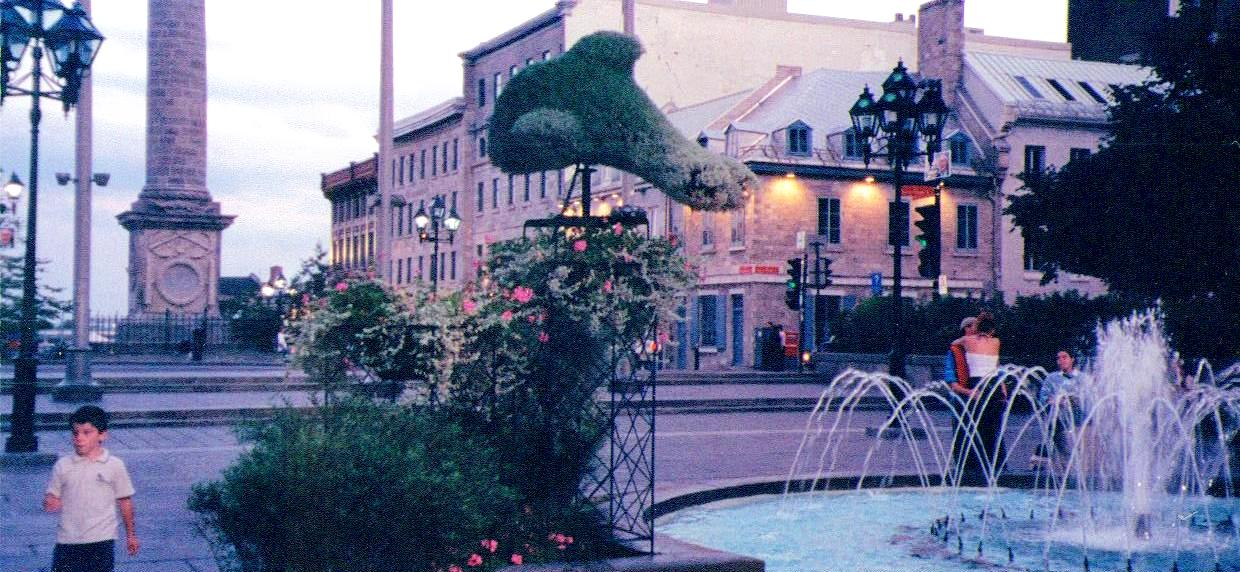
Vauquelin Square and Nelson's Column

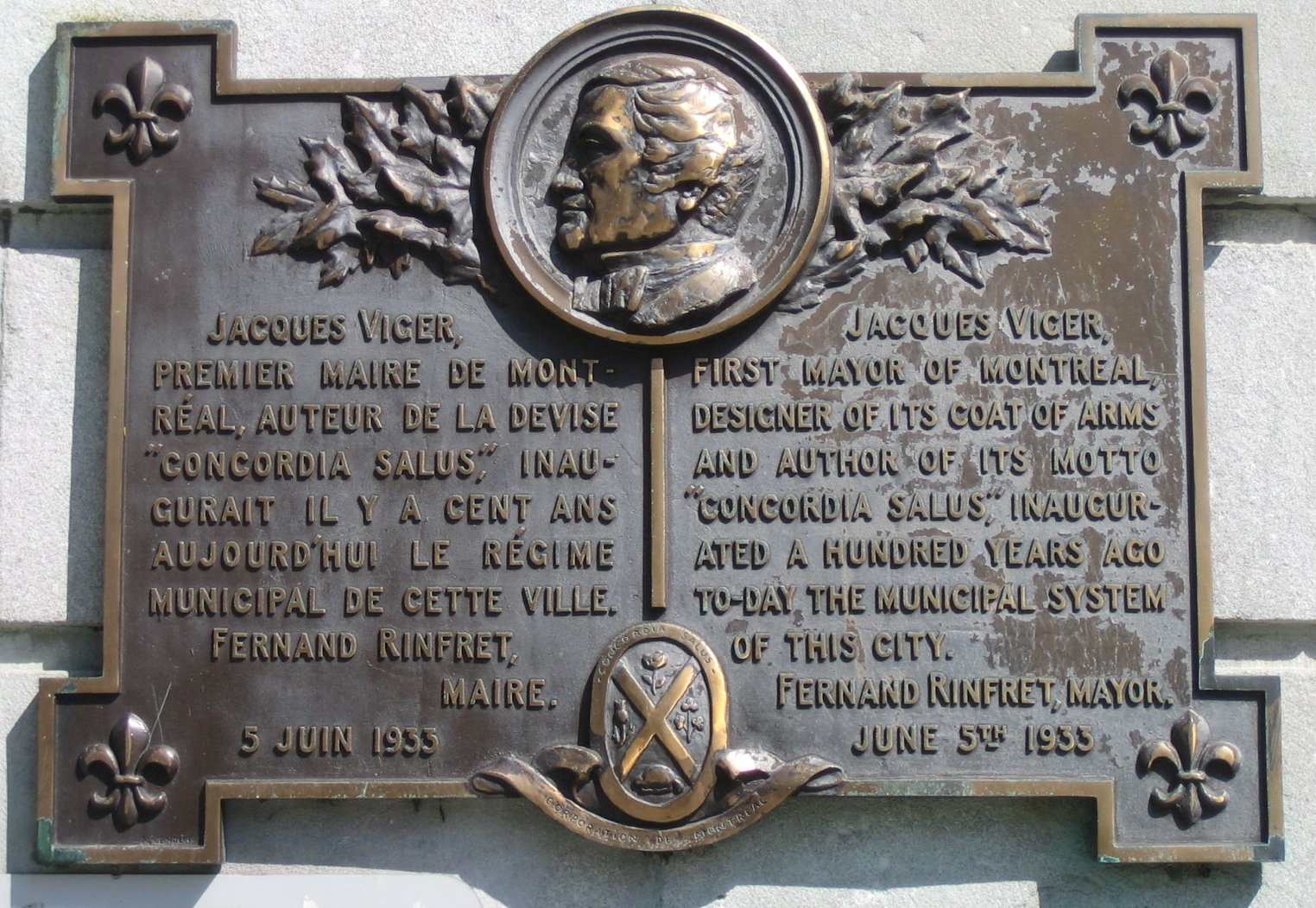
Jacques Viger plaque

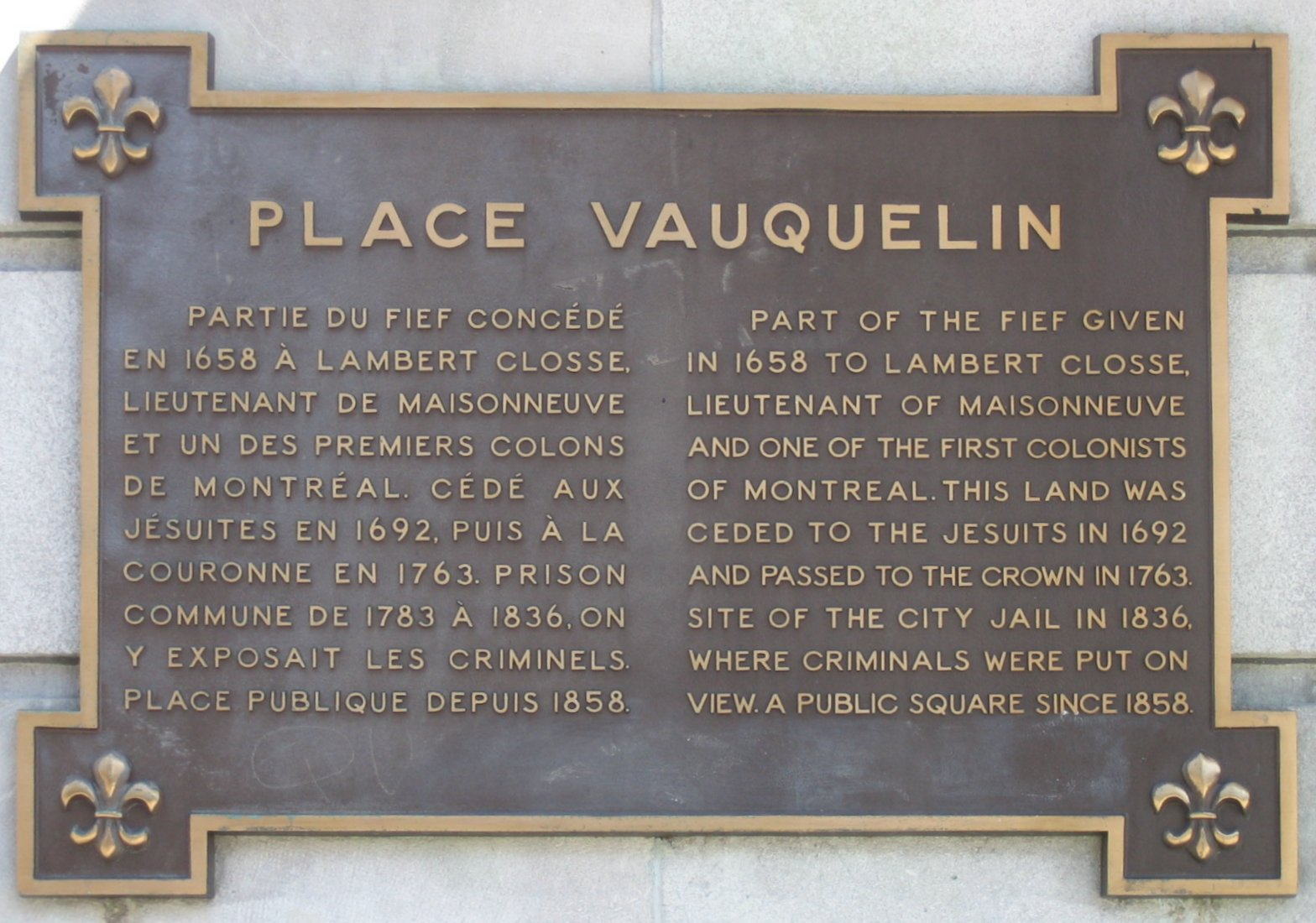
