= Statue of Jean Vauquelin =

- Monument à Jean Vauquelin (French)
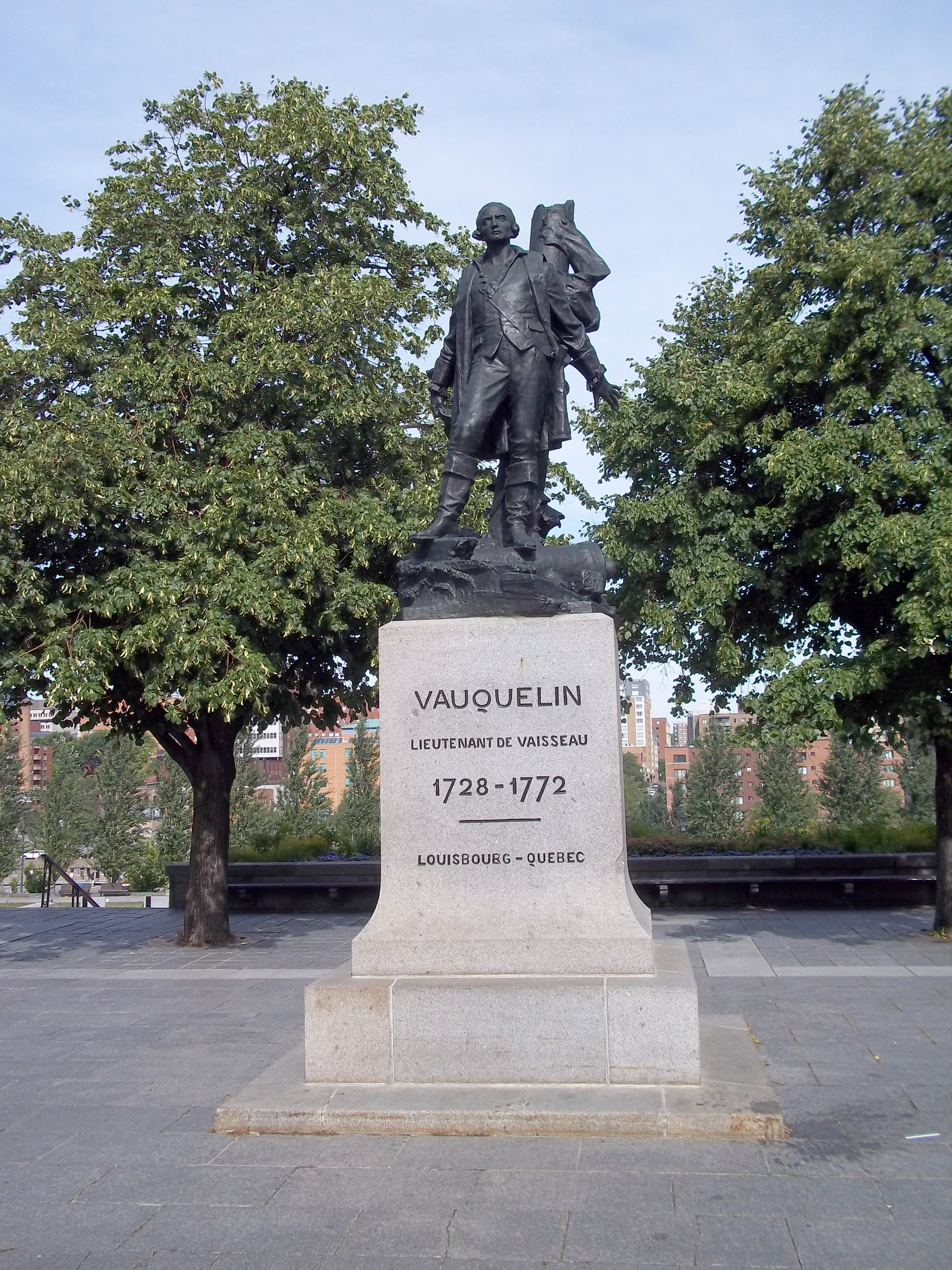
- The monument in 2011
- Artist: Eugène-Paul Benet
- Medium: Sculpture
- Subject: Jean Vauquelin
- Location: Montreal, Quebec, Canada; 45°30′31″N 73°33′17″W

The Statue of Jean Vauquelin (French: Monument à Jean Vauquelin) by Eugène Bénet is a sculpture installed in Montreal's Vauquelin Square, in Quebec, Canada in 1930. The statue depicts an event that took place during the Battle of Pointe-aux-Trembles in the Saint Lawrence River on 16 May 1760 during the French and Indian War. Jean Vauquelin is shown standing on the deck of the frigate Atalante in front of the mast having nailed his colours to it. He fought for two hours with persistent bravery till his ammunition was spent before surrendering. The statue was created by sculptor Eugène-Paul Benet.
