= Jean Vauquelin =

French naval officer (1728–1772)

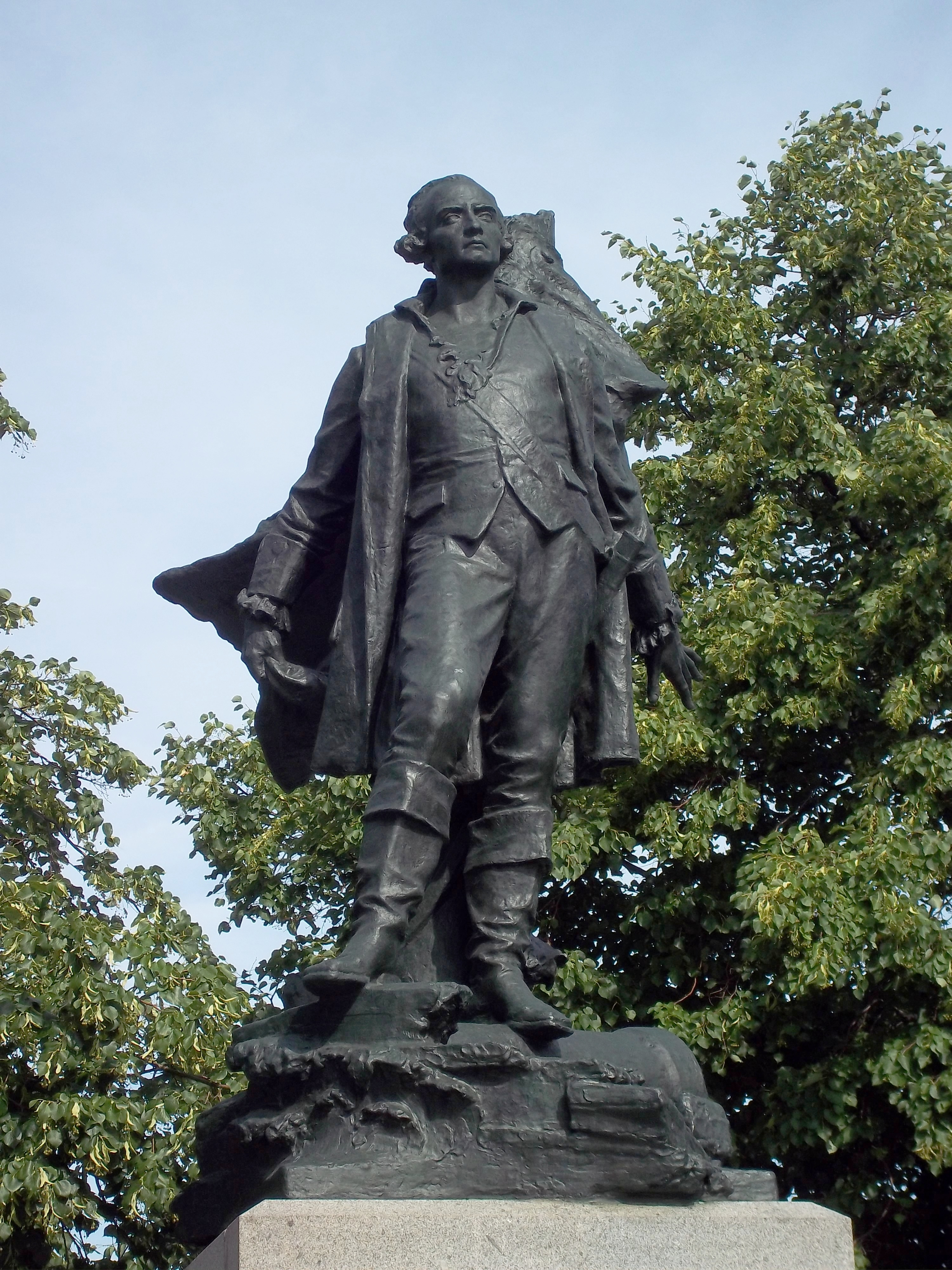
- Statue of Jean Vauquelin in Vauquelin Square, Montreal
- Born: 1 February 1728; Dieppe, Province of Normandy, France
- Died: 10 November 1772 (aged 44); Rochefort, Charente-Maritime, France
- Occupation: Naval Officer

Ship-of-the-line Lieutenant Jean Vauquelin (February 1728 – 10 November 1772) was a French Navy officer who served in the Seven Years' War. Vauquelin came to Canada as part of the naval force involved in the Seven Years' War. He arrived in 1758 in command of the frigate Atalante. Ensuring action involved Louisbourg and the naval battles with the British on St. Lawrence. In 1760, he and his badly damaged ship were captured, the ship burned, and Vauquelin was held by the British. His bravery had impressed his foes, who soon released him for return to France.

== Biography ==
Jean Vauquelin was born in February 1728 at Dieppe. He was the son of a merchant marine captain. Having taken the trade at an early age with his father, he served as an officer aboard a frigate during the War of Austrian Succession. Becoming captain himself in the merchant marine in 1750, he was recruited at the beginning of the Seven Years' War, by the commander of the navy in Le Havre to serve as an officer.

== Naval career ==
On 26 April 1757, he became commander of the frigate Tourterelle and entered the Marine Royale. In February 1758, he became lieutenant and was given command of the Pèlerine, a 30 gun frigate bought by the king from a builder in Le Havre and renamed the Aréthuse.

Sent to Île Royale, he entered the port of Louisbourg on 9 June, getting past the Royal Navy's blockade commanded by Admiral Edward Boscawen. After assisting the defense of Louisbourg, Vauquelin slipped away under cover of night, evading the blockade a second time and reaching France after a rapid crossing of the Atlantic. His exploits were subsequently congratulated by the French minister of defense. Admiral Boscawen is reputed to have remarked after Vauquelin's bold escape that if he were a British officer, Boscawen would have given him a ship-of-the-line. Returning to Canada the following year as captain of the frigate Atalante, Vauquelin participated in naval operations during the 1759 Siege of Quebec, and then at the Battle of Sainte-Foy, a French victory.

=== Battle of Pointe-aux-Trembles ===
However, from April to May 1760, while escorting a fleet of Bateaux headed for le Chevalier de Lévis's attempt to retake Quebec, Vauquelin was pursued by a large British squadron led by the 74-gun ship-of-the-line HMS Vanguard. By that time, the thirty-gun Atalante was the last French frigate left to guard the convoy of Bateaux, and Vauquelin realized that he had to make a stand. After sailing as far up the St. Lawrence as he could, Captain Vauquelin turned Atalante broadside to fight it out with his pursuers. Vauquelin literally nailed his colors to the mast and engaged the two frigates that had pursued them. Finally, with the magazines of Atalante completely devoid of ammunition, the wounded but still defiant Vauquelin cast his sword into the sea and ordered his men to abandon the ship. He and 11 of his officers and men waited on the quarterdeck for the British to take them, prisoner. Atalante had taken so much damage in her gallant fight that the British were forced to burn her the next day. Quickly repatriated, he went back to France and was promoted to captain of a larger ship in 1761.

After several other commands, he died in 1772 whilst attempting to establish French colonies in Madagascar.

== Legacy ==
- Statue of Jean Vauquelin, Vauquelin Square, Montreal
- Rue Vauquelin in Dieppe
- Destroyer for the French marine nationale from 1933 to 1942
- Destroyer for the French marine nationale from 1955 to 1986
