= Scottish National Portrait Gallery =

Art museum in Edinburgh, Scotland

National Galleries Scotland: Portrait

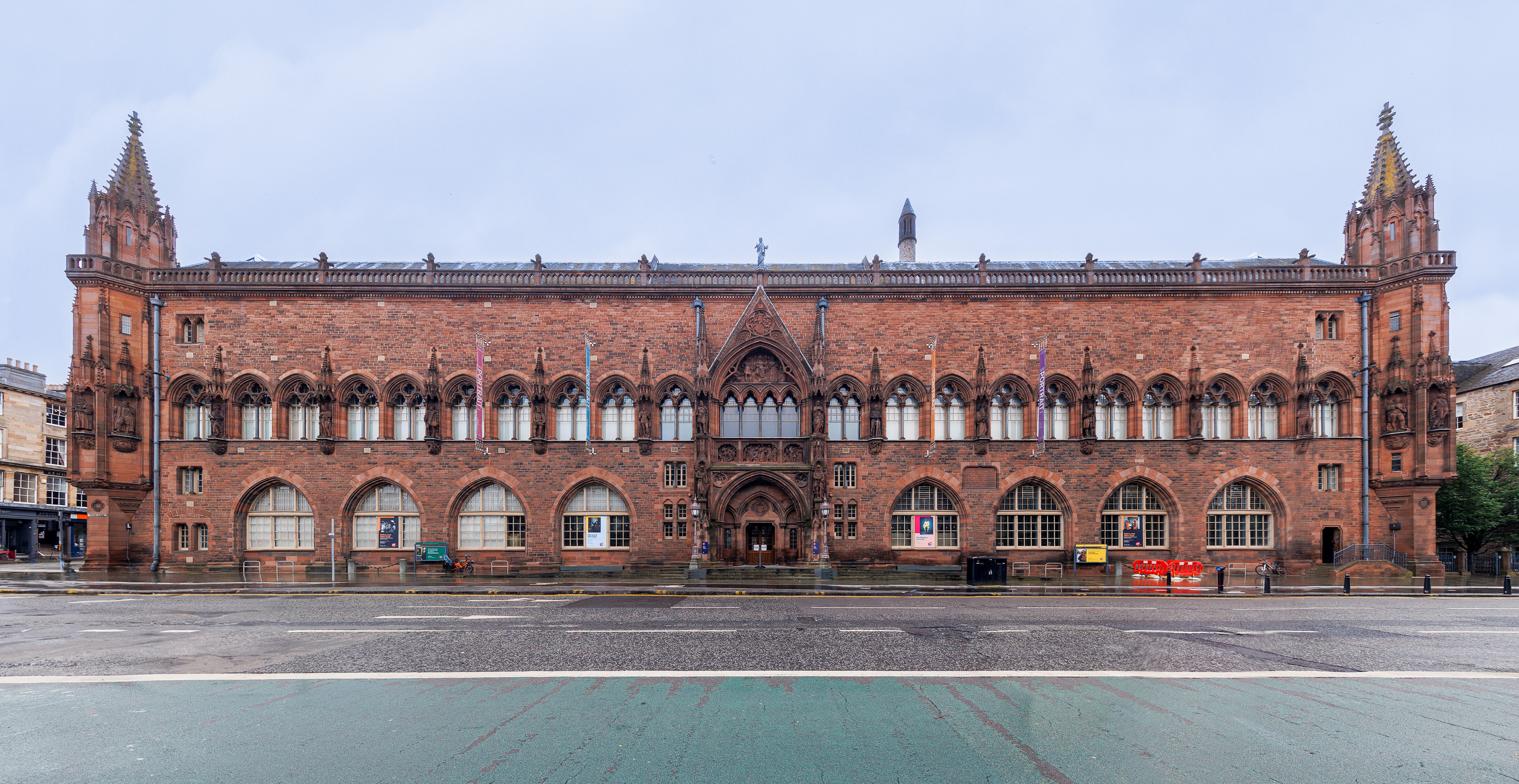
- Queen Street façade

- Location within Edinburgh city centre
- Former name: Scottish National Portrait Gallery
- Established: 1889; 137 years ago
- Location: 1 Queen Street; Edinburgh EH2 1JD; Scotland
- Coordinates: 55°57′19.5″N 3°11′36.9″W
- Visitors: 372,743 (2019)
- Public transit access: St Andrew Square
- Website: nationalgalleries.org

National Galleries Scotland: Portrait is an art museum on Queen Street, Edinburgh. Portrait holds the national collections of portraits, all of which are of, but not necessarily by, Scots. It also holds the Scottish National Photography Collection.

Since 1889 it has been housed in its red sandstone Gothic revival building, designed by Robert Rowand Anderson and built between 1885 and 1890 to accommodate the gallery and the museum collection of the Society of Antiquaries of Scotland. The building was donated by John Ritchie Findlay, owner of The Scotsman newspaper. In 1985 the National Museum of Antiquities of Scotland was amalgamated with the Royal Scottish Museum, and later moved to Chambers Street as part of the National Museum of Scotland. The Scottish National Portrait Gallery expanded to take over the whole building, and reopened on 1 December 2011 as "Portrait" after being closed since April 2009 for the first comprehensive refurbishment in its history, carried out by Page\Park Architects.

Portrait is part of National Galleries Scotland, a public body that also owns the Scottish National Gallery of Modern Art and the Scottish National Gallery in Edinburgh.

== History ==
The Society of Antiquaries of Scotland was founded in 1780 by David Erskine, 11th Earl of Buchan. Its members donated items of interest, and in 1781 it bought a place to properly store this material, the Antiquarian Society Hall, located between the Cowgate and Parliament Close, just to the west of Old Fishmarket Close, as shown on Alexander Kincaid's Plan of the City. It moved several times, from 1826 it rented space in the Royal Institution at the foot of The Mound, owned by the Board of Manufactures. By 1851 its collections were in 24 George Street, in November it agreed with the Board to make the collections National Property, with the government to provide continuing accommodation for the collections and for the Society's meetings. As part of the agreement, the collections moved back to the Royal Institution in 1858.

Erskine had also formed a collection of Scottish portraits in the late 18th century, many are now in the museum. When the National Portrait Gallery, London, was established in 1856 and became very successful, the Scottish historian Thomas Carlyle was among those calling for a Scottish equivalent, but the government was reluctant to commit to funding the project.

In 1882 John Ritchie Findlay endowed a new building on Queen Street, costing £50,000, designed by Robert Rowand Anderson to accommodate both the antiquities collections and the portraits. It was completed in 1890. At the centre of the facade of the symmetrical building, a large Main Hall formed a shared entrance to the two institutions. Portrait occupied the east wing of the building, and the Museum of Antiquities took up the west wing.

The portrait gallery was established in 1882, before its new building was completed. The London National Portrait Gallery was the first such separate museum in the world, however it did not move into its current purpose-built building until 1896, making the Edinburgh gallery the first in the world to be specially built as a portrait gallery. Special national portrait galleries remain a distinct Anglophone speciality, with the other more recent examples in Washington DC (1968), Canberra, Australia (1998), and Ottawa, Canada (2001) not so far copied in other countries.

The building was opened in 1889 under curator John Miller Gray. Over the years new facilities such as a shop and café were added in a piecemeal fashion, and the galleries rearranged and remodelled, generally reducing the clarity of the layout of the building, and often the ceiling height, as well as blocking off many windows. The building was shared with the National Museum of Antiquities, which latterly became the Museum of Scotland and moved to a new building in 2009, at which point the long-planned refurbishment of the portrait gallery could begin, with funding from the Scottish Government and the Heritage Lottery Fund, amongst others. The work generally restores the gallery spaces to their original layout, with areas set aside for education, the shop & café, and a new glass lift—greatly improving access for disabled visitors. In total Portrait has 60% more gallery space after the changes, and at the reopening displayed 849 works, of which 480 were by Scots. The cost of the refurbishment was £17.6 million. The entire building comprises 5672 Sq. metres.

== The building ==
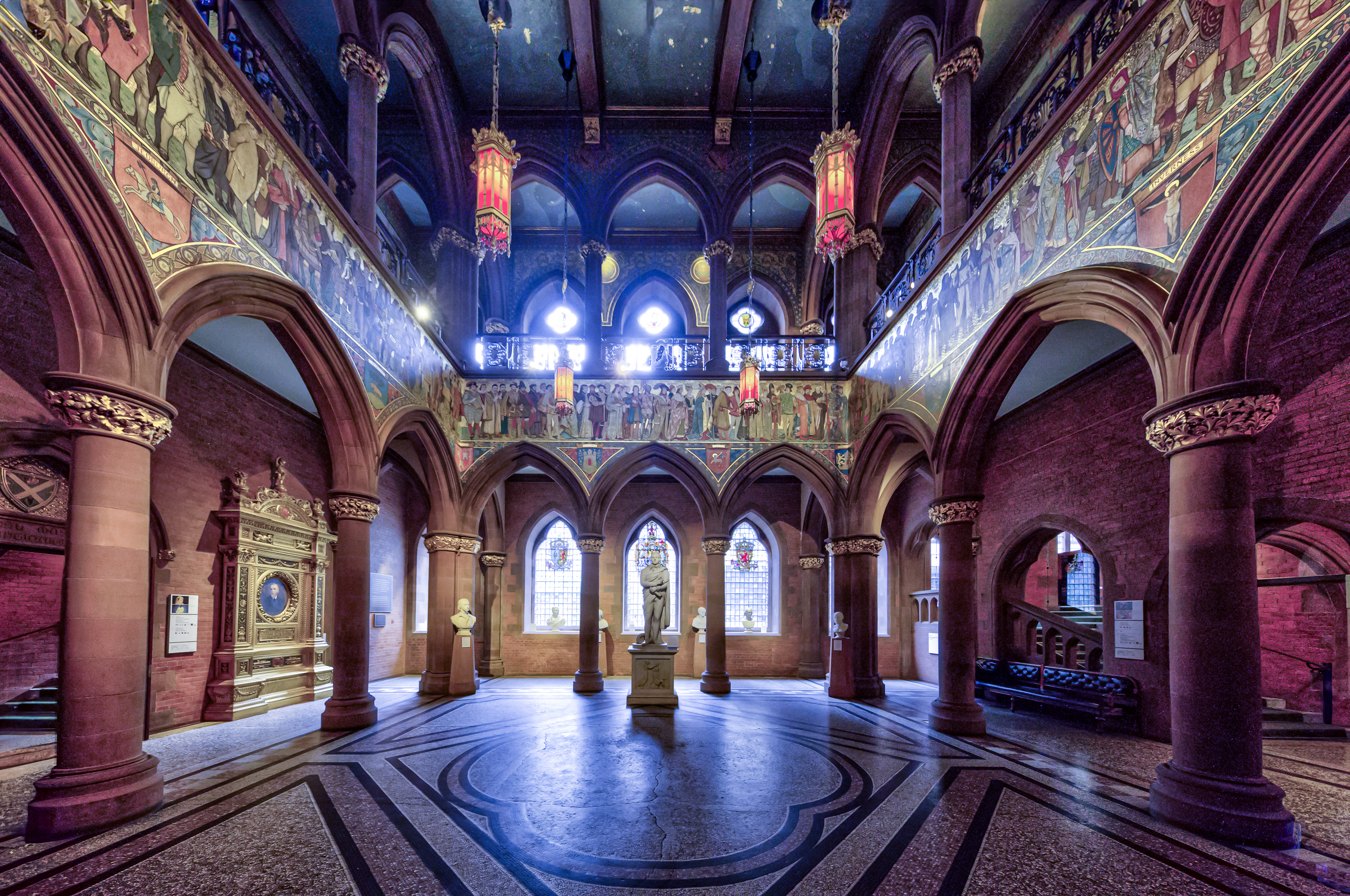
Main entrance hall, with the William Hole frieze of 1898

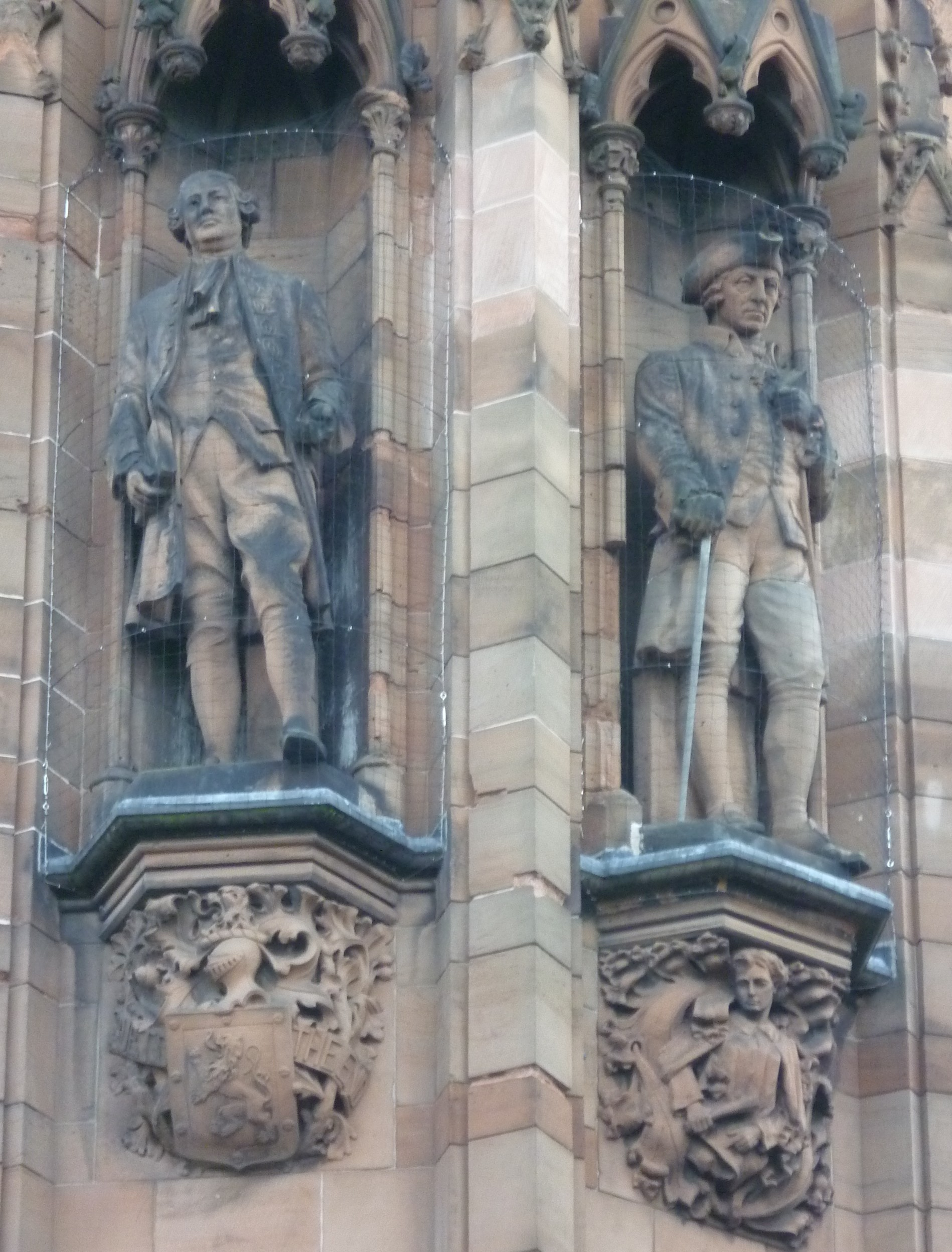
Sculpted figures of David Hume and Adam Smith on the exterior

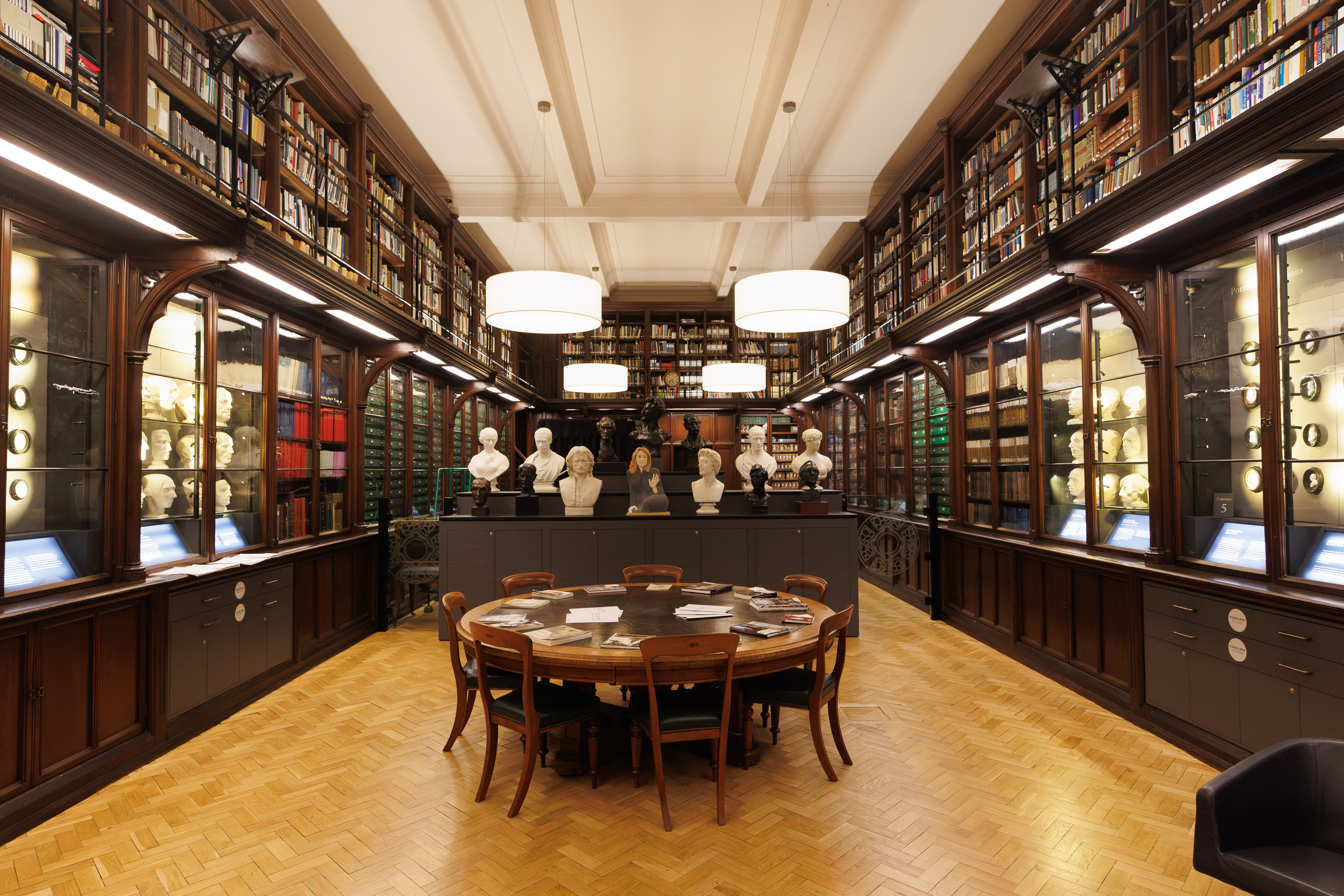
Library and Print Room

The National Portrait Gallery building is a large edifice at the east end of Queen Street, built in red sandstone from Corsehill Quarry, outside Annan in Dumfriesshire. It was designed by Robert Rowand Anderson in the Gothic Revival style with a combination of Arts and Crafts and 13th-century Gothic influences, and is a Category A listed building. Built between 1885 and 1890, the building is noted for its ornate Spanish Gothic style, an unusual addition to Edinburgh's mostly Georgian Neoclassical New Town. The windows are in carved pointed arches and the main entrance on the Queen Street front, surrounded a large gabled arch, leads to the main entrance hall, arcaded with pointed arches, which originally served both the National Portrait Gallery to its east, and the National Museum of Antiquities of Scotland to its west. A distinctive feature of the gallery is its four octagonal corner towers topped with crocketed Gothic pinnacles; originally, Anderson had intended to flank the façade with a pair of large Franco-Scottish tourelles, but these were replaced at the request of the benefactor by the pointed turrets seen today.

Anderson's design was influenced by a number of other Gothic and Gothic Revival architectural works, in particular the rectangular Gothic Doge's Palace in Venice and the works of George Gilbert Scott, and similarities have also been drawn between the Portrait Gallery and Anderson's Mount Stuart House on the Isle of Bute, which he designed for the 3rd Marquess of Bute in the late 1870s.

Around the exterior are sculpted figures of noted Scots set in niches, designed by William Birnie Rhind. These were added in the 1890s to compensate for the lack of contemporary portraits of medieval Scots in the gallery's collection at the time, as was the large processional frieze inside the main entrance hall, painted by William Hole. This mural, added in 1898, depicts an array of notable Scots from history, ranging from Saint Ninian to Robert Burns. Figures were added to the frieze over the years after the gallery opened, and Hole added further large mural narrative scenes on the 1st floor later.

== Collection ==
The museum's collection totals some 3,000 paintings and sculptures, 25,000 prints and drawings, and 38,000 photographs. The collection essentially begins in the Renaissance, initially with works mainly by foreign artists of Scottish royalty, nobility, and mainly printed portraits of clergymen and writers; the most notable paintings were mostly made on the Continent (often during periods of exile from the turbulent Scottish political scene). As in England, the Scottish Reformation all but extinguished religious art, and until the 19th century portrait painting dominated Scottish painting, with patrons gradually extending down the social scale. In the 16th century most painted portraits are of royalty or the more important nobility; the oldest work in the collection is a portrait of James IV of Scotland from 1507.

The collection includes two portraits of Mary, Queen of Scots, although neither dates from her lifetime; one was painted some 20 years after her death in 1587, and the other is later still; there are also a number of 19th-century paintings showing scenes from her life. Mary's circle is actually better represented by portraits from the life, with her three husbands all having portraits, including Henry Stuart, Lord Darnley by Hans Eworth and an unknown painter, and miniatures from 1566 of James Hepburn, 4th Earl of Bothwell and his first wife. There is a portrait of Mary's nemesis, Regent Morton, by Arnold Bronckhorst who was from 1581 the first artist to hold the title of "King's Painter" in Scotland, though he only spent about three years there. The gallery holds several works by Bronckhorst and his successor, Adrian Vanson; both were skilled painters in the Netherlandish tradition.

The collection includes portraits by Bronckhorst and Vanson of James VI and I, but the others were made after he succeeded to the English throne and moved to London, where the many portraits of other Stuart monarchs were also mostly painted. The first significant native Scot to be a portrait painter, George Jamesone (1589/90-1644) only once got the chance to paint his monarch, when Charles I visited Edinburgh in 1633. The collection includes two Jamesone self-portraits and portraits of the Scottish aristocracy, as well as some imagined portraits of heroes of Scotland's past. There are three portraits by Jamesone's talented pupil John Michael Wright and ten aristocratic portraits by Sir John Baptist Medina, the last "King's Painter" before the Acts of Union 1707.

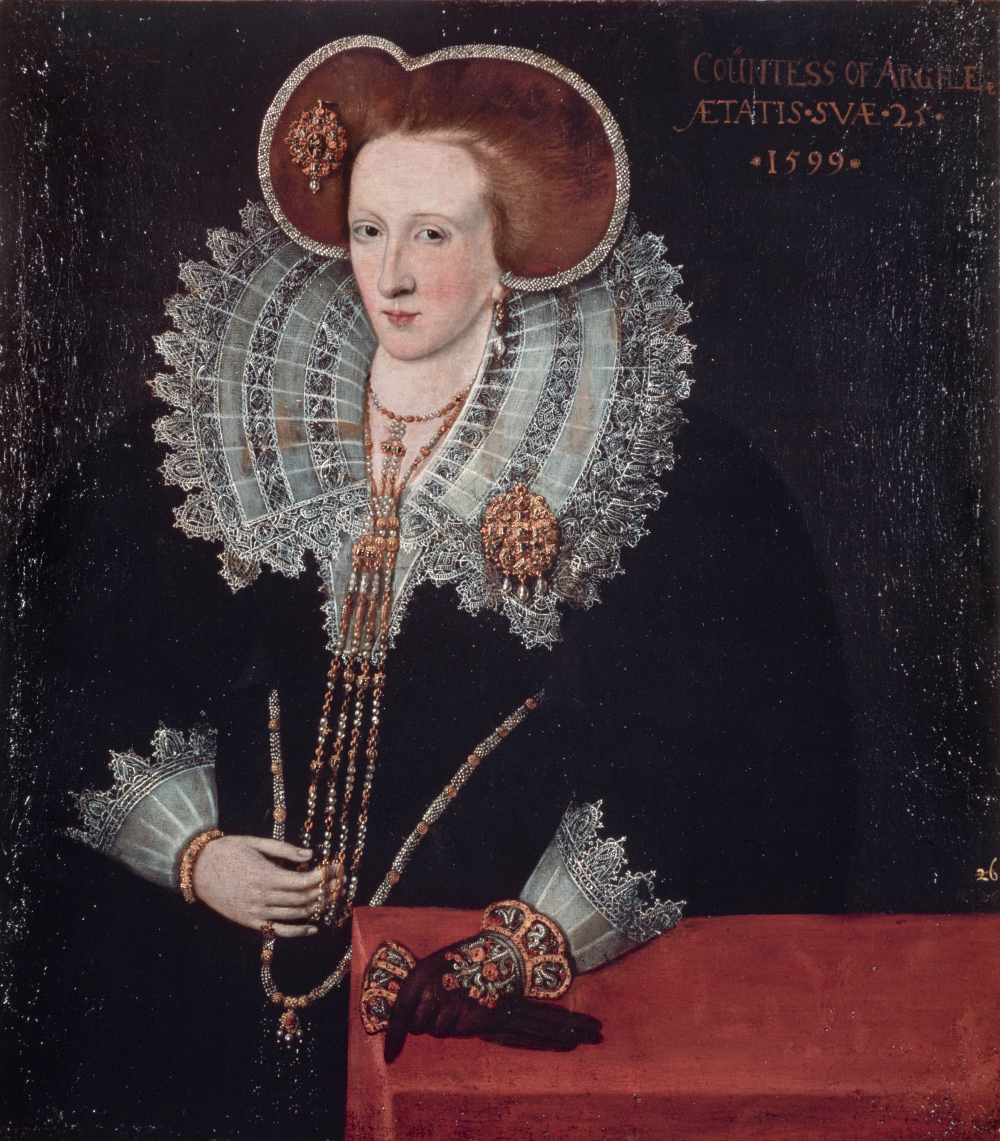
Adrian Vanson, Agnes Douglas, Countess of Argyll, 1599

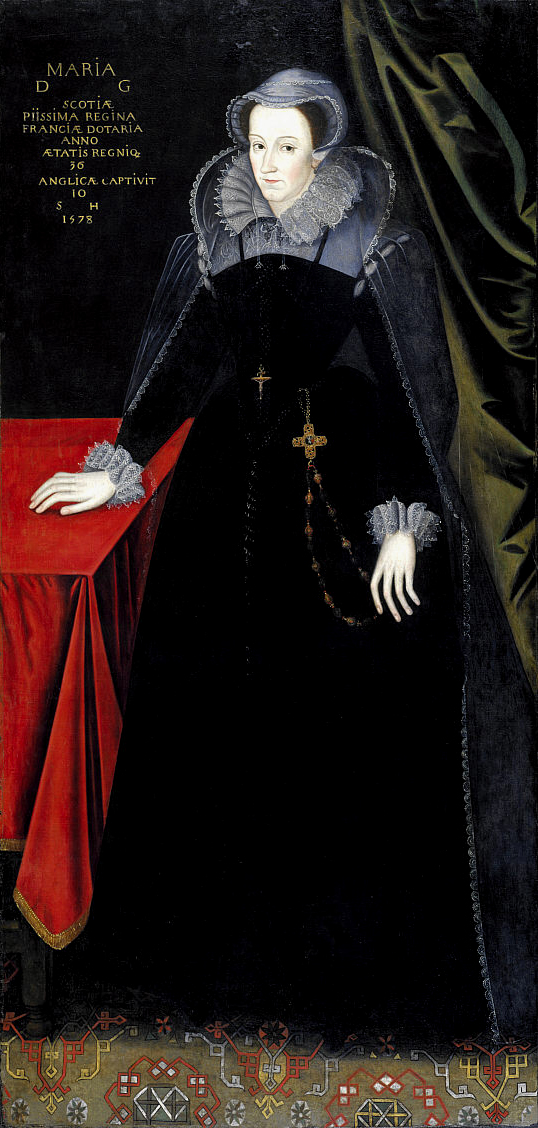
Mary, Queen of Scots, posthumous portrait, c. 1610

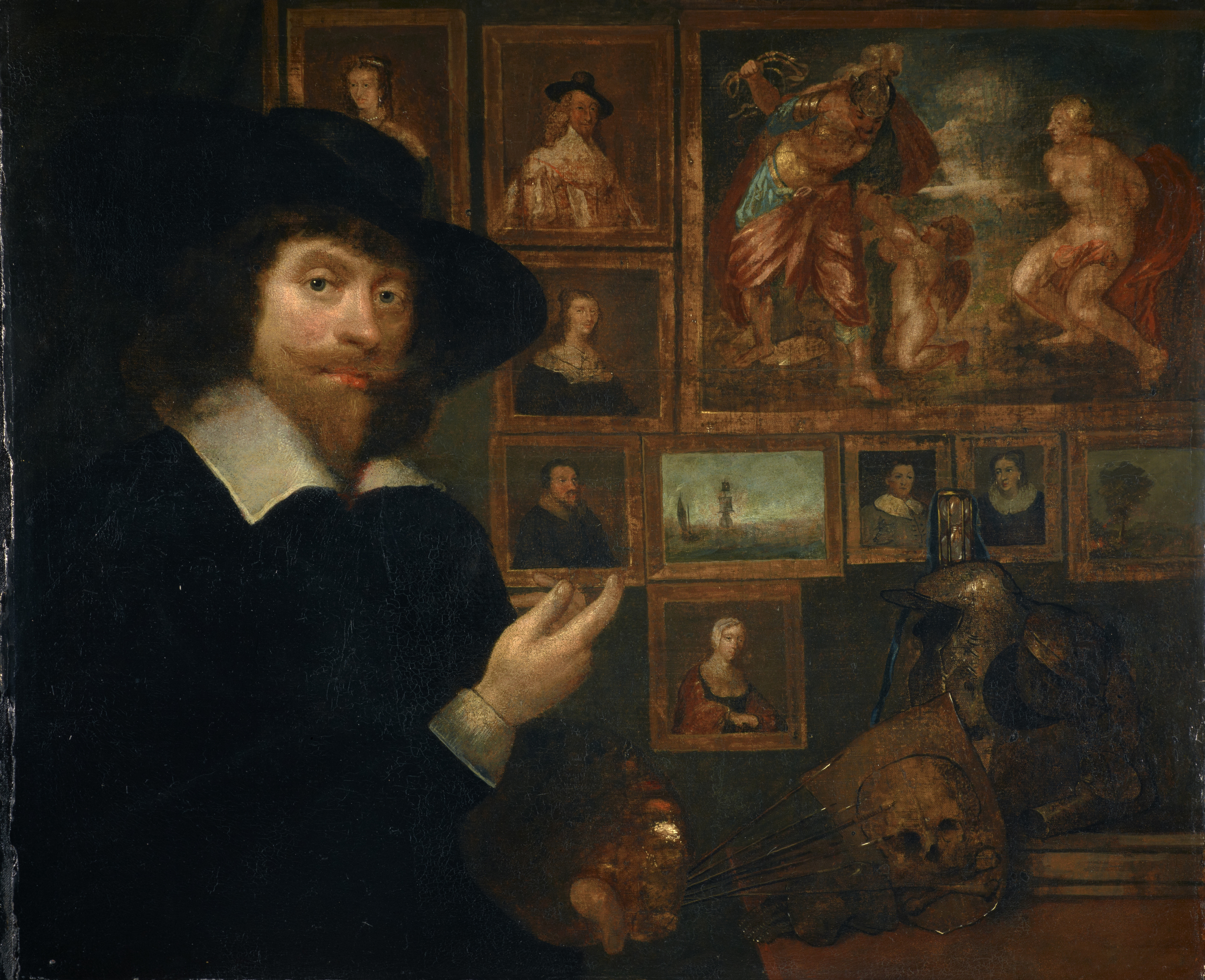
George Jamesone, self-portrait, c. 1642

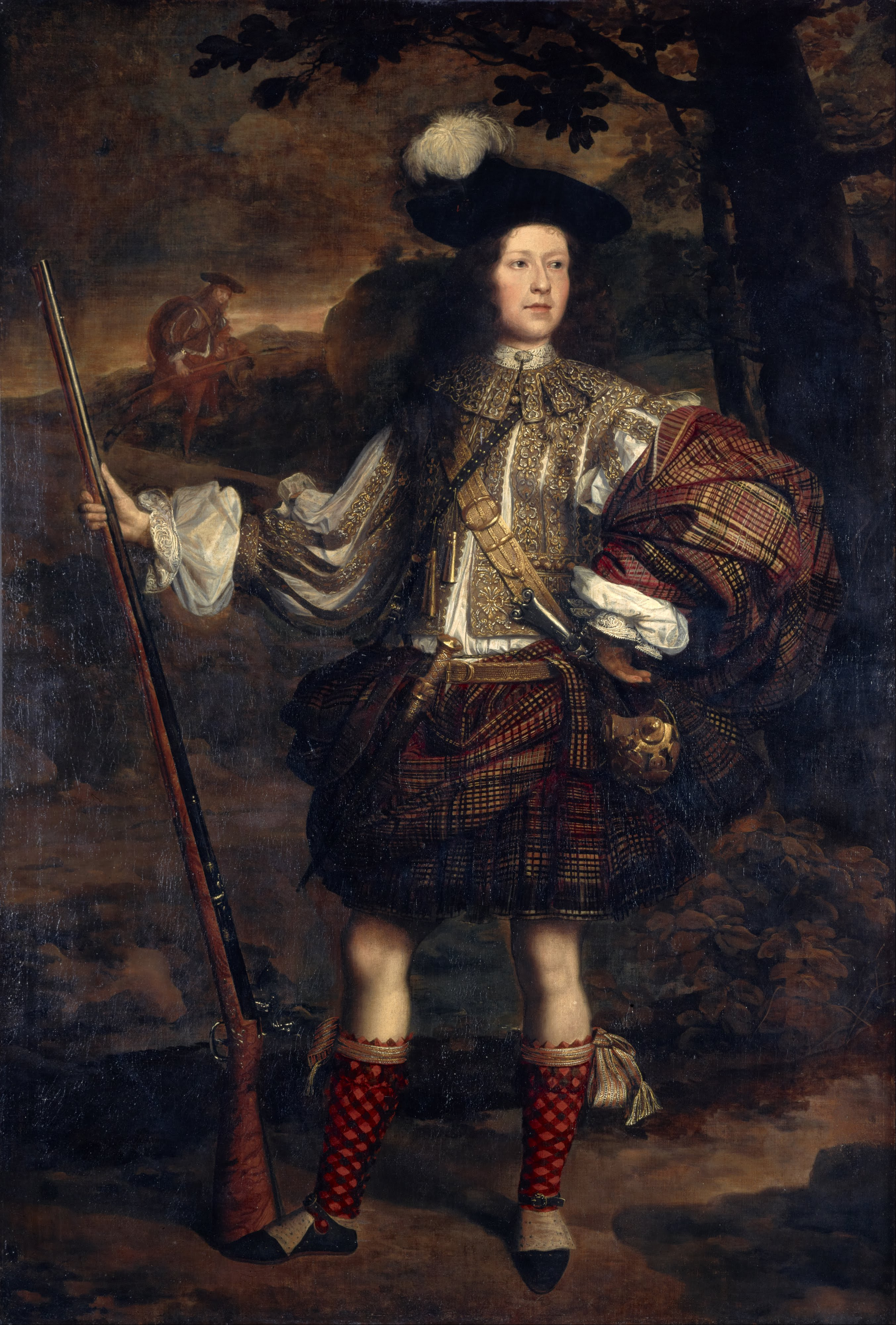
John Michael Wright, Lord Mungo Murray in plaid, 1683

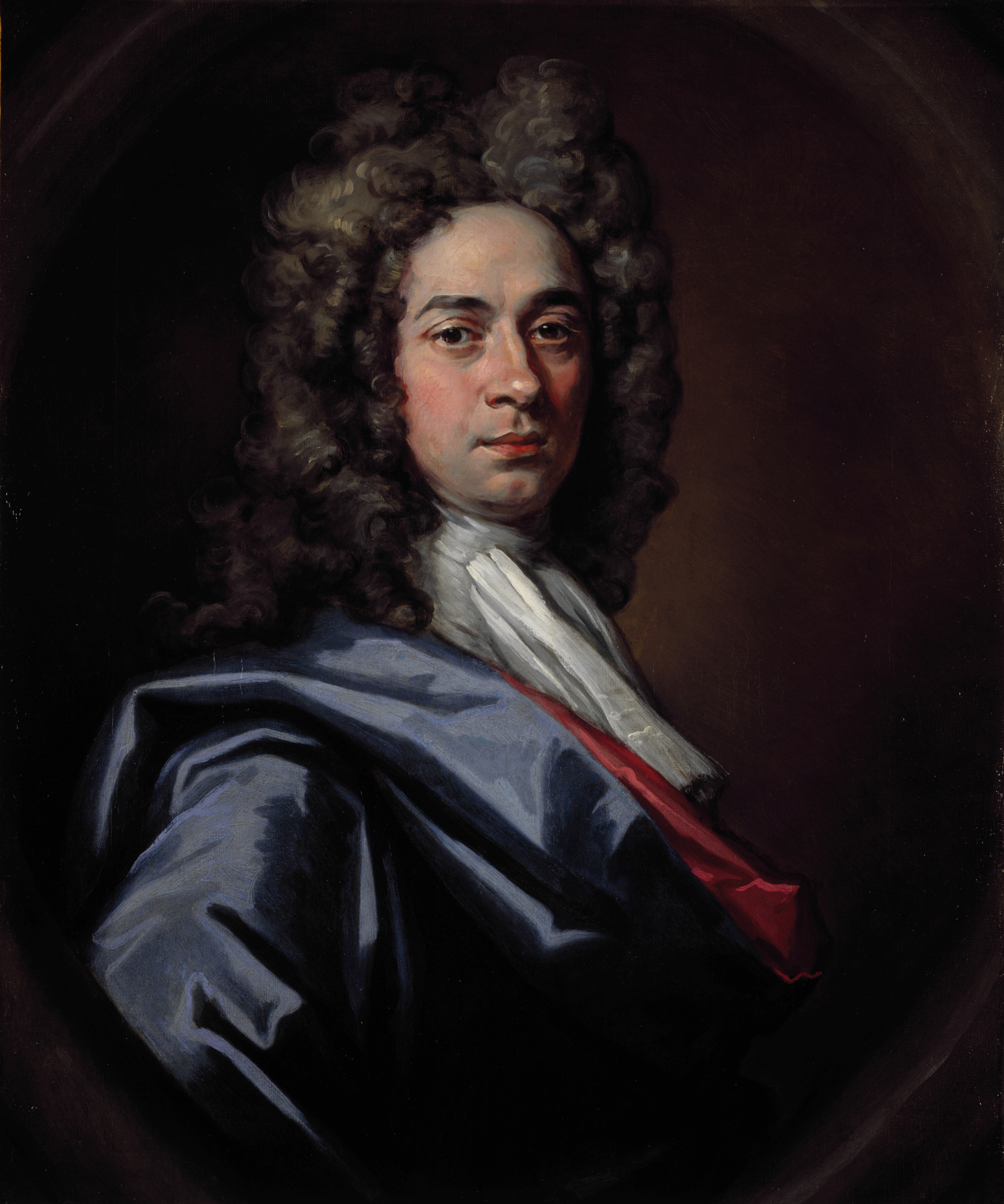
John Baptist Medina, self-portrait, 1698

The display "Blazing with Crimson: Tartan Portraits" (until December 2013) concentrates on portraits featuring tartan, which begin to be painted in the late 17th century, at that time apparently with no political connotations. The museum has one of the earliest examples, a full-length portrait of 1683 by John Michael Wright of Lord Mungo Murray, son of John Murray, 1st Marquess of Atholl, wearing a belted plaid for hunting. The wearing of tartan was banned after the 1745 Jacobite Rebellion, but reappears in grand portraits after a few decades, before becoming ever more popular with Romanticism and the works of Sir Walter Scott. Also wearing tartan is Flora MacDonald, painted by Richard Wilson in London after her arrest for helping Bonnie Prince Charlie to escape after the 1745 Jacobite Rebellion.

Scottish portrait painting flourished in the 18th century and Allan Ramsay and Sir Henry Raeburn are well represented with 13 and 15 works respectively, the former with many paintings of figures from the Scottish Enlightenment, as well as the recently acquired lost portrait of Charles Edward Stuart, and the career of the latter extending into the 19th century with portraits of Walter Scott and others. The museum owns the iconic portrait of Robert Burns by Alexander Nasmyth. The largest number of works by a single artist is the 58 by the sculptor and gem-cutter James Tassie (1735–1799), who developed a distinctive format of large fired glass paste (or vitreous enamel) relief "medallion" portraits in profile, initially modelled in wax. His subjects include Adam Smith, James Beattie and Robert Adam. Adam disliked having his portrait taken but Tassie was a member of his social circle he did not refuse, with the result that, as with the Naysmyth portrait of Burns, almost all images of Smith derive from the exemplar in the museum.

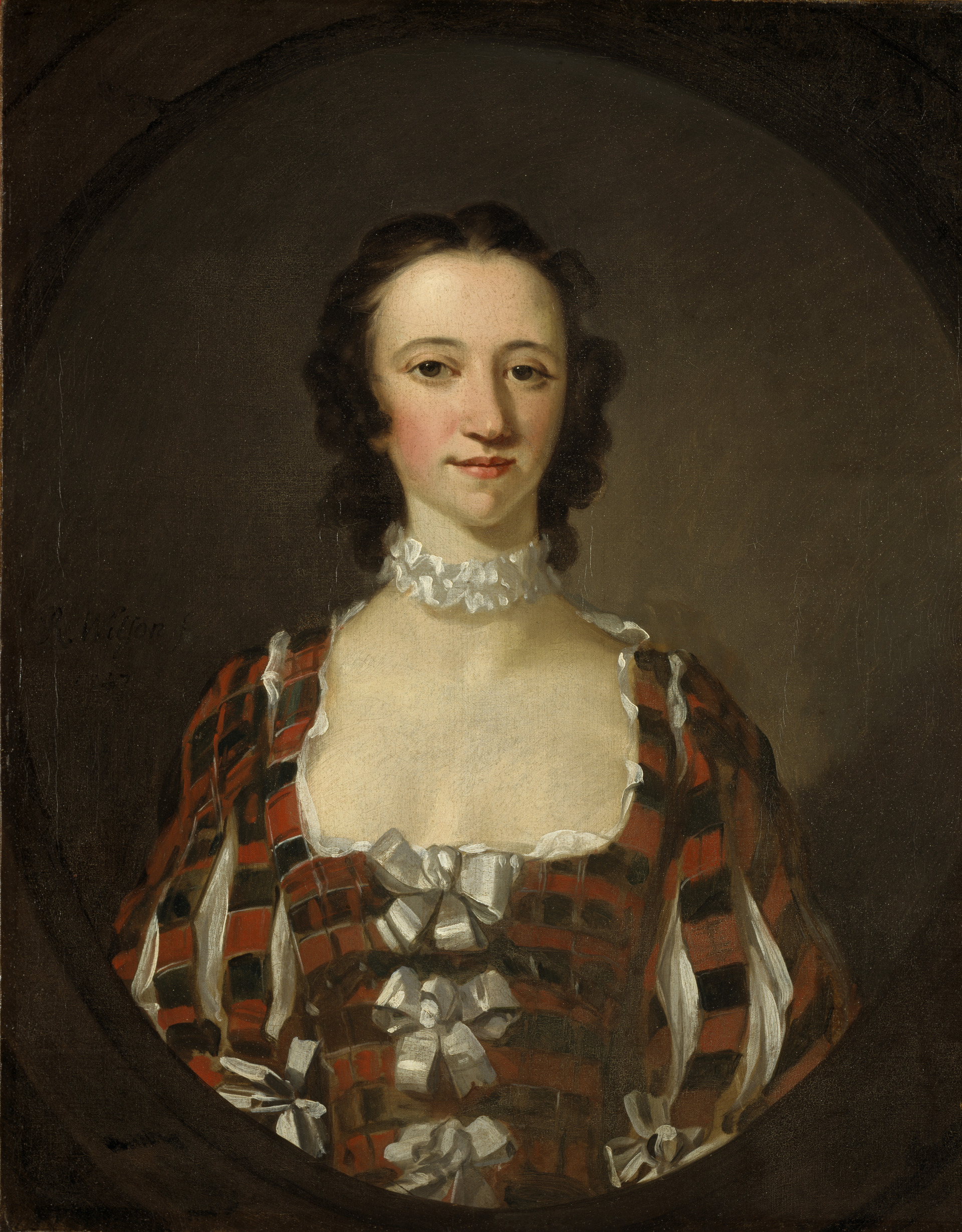
Richard Wilson, Flora MacDonald, 1747

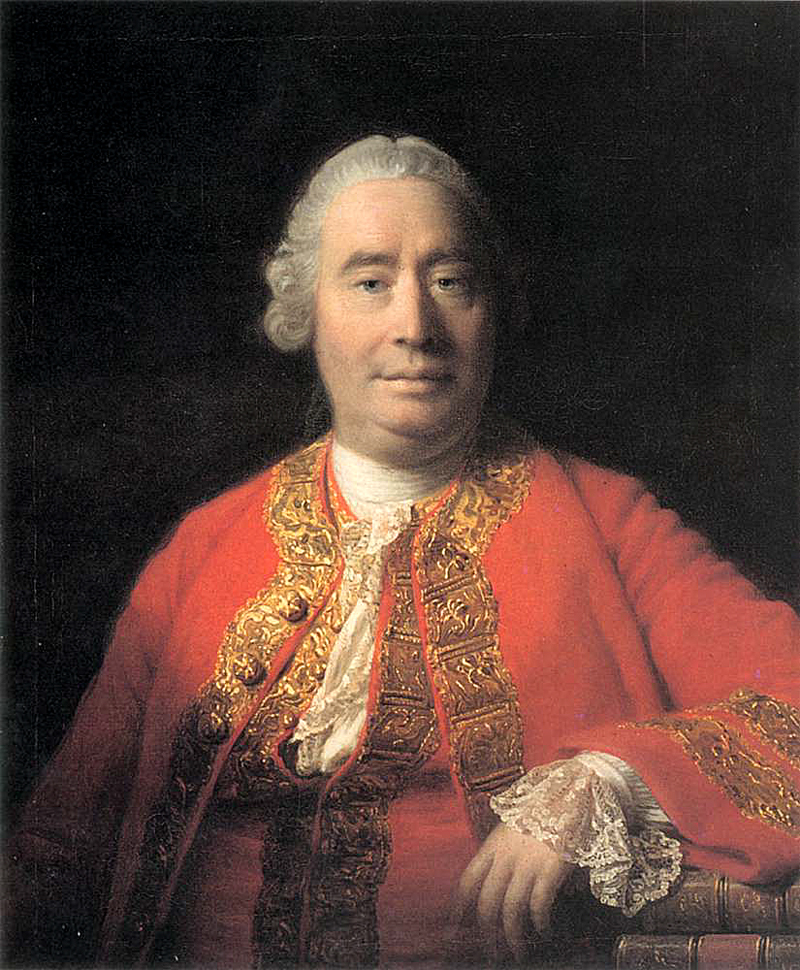
Allan Ramsay, David Hume, 1766

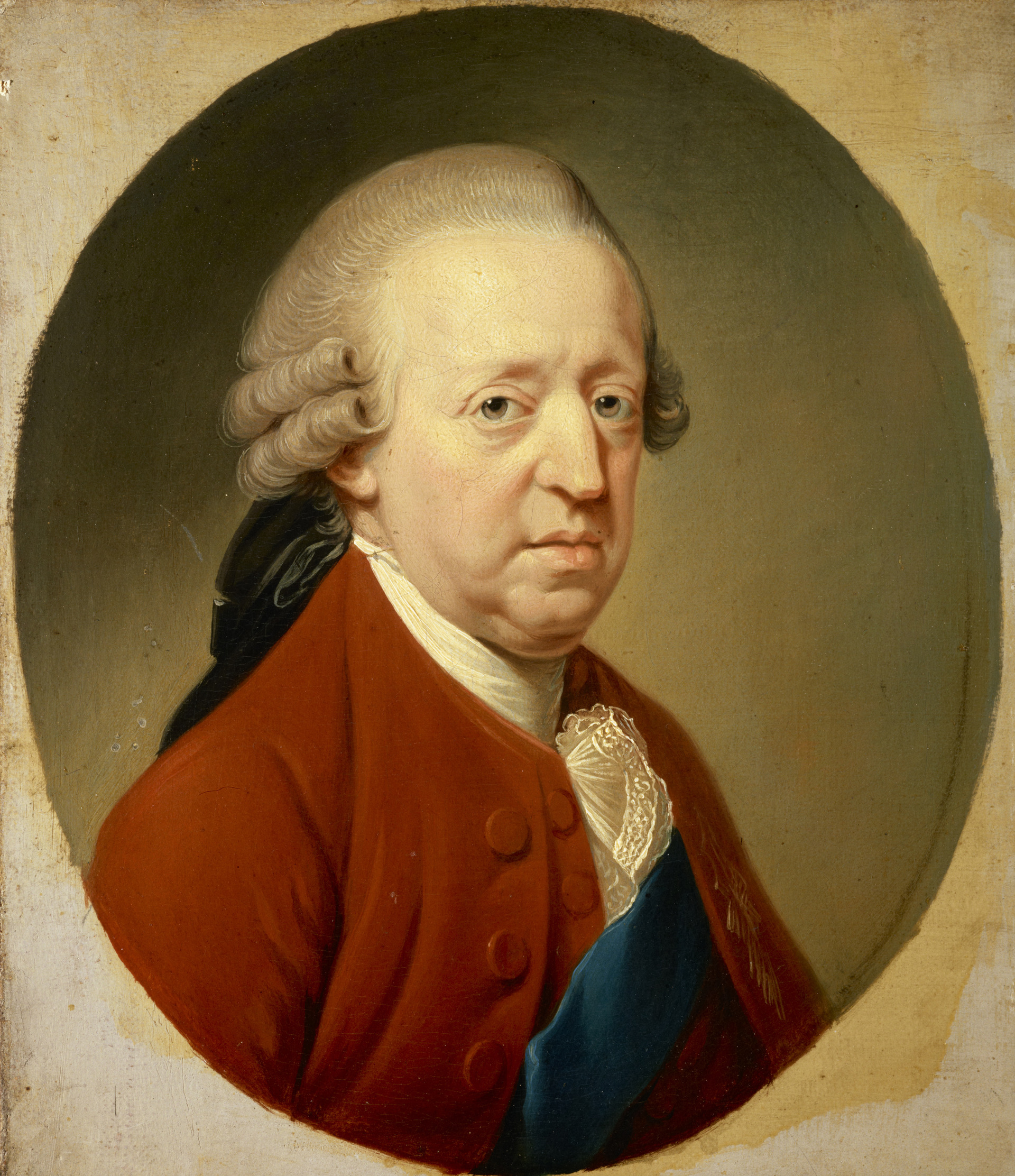
Hugh Douglas Hamilton, "Bonnie Prince Charlie" in later life, 1775

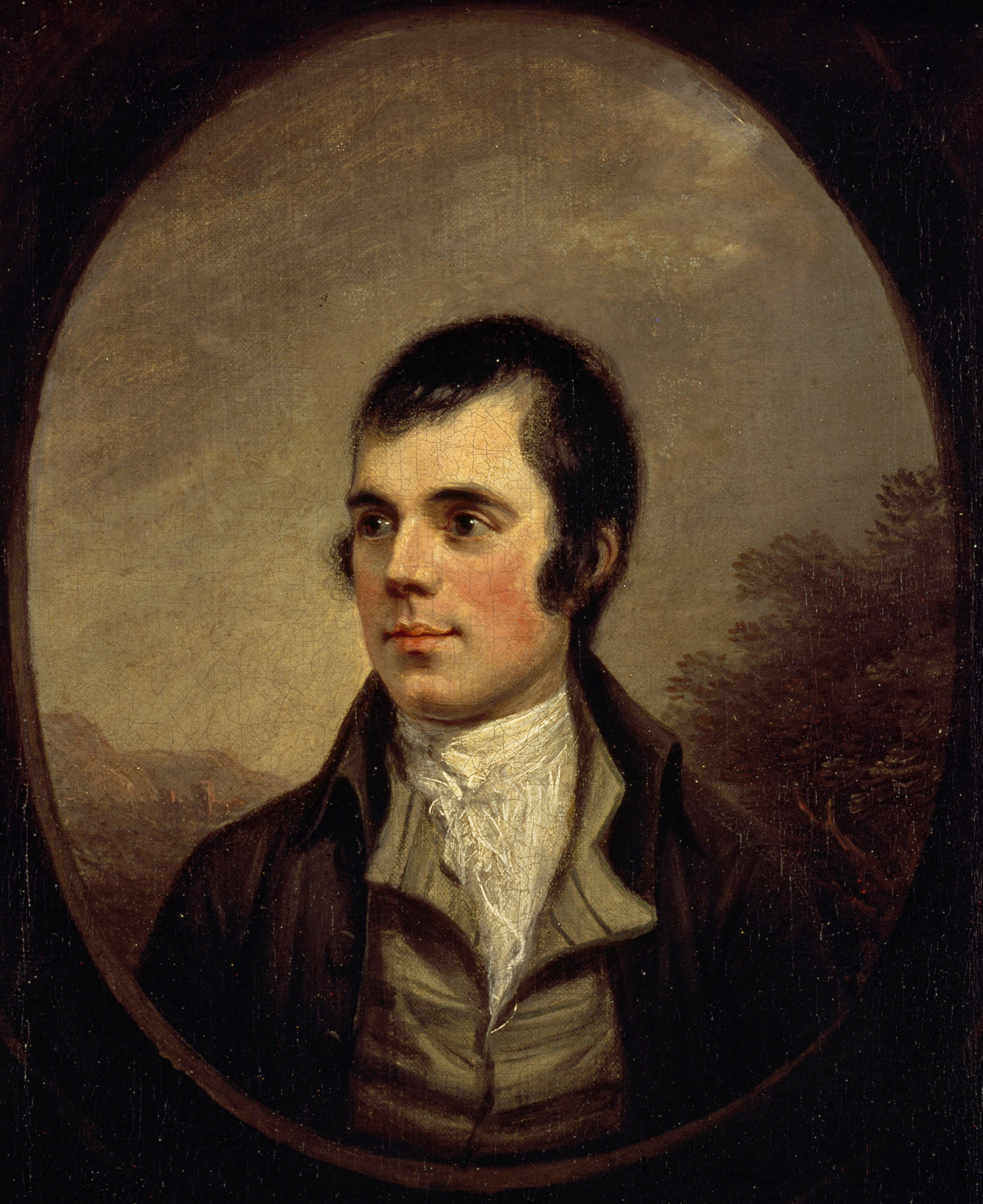
Robert Burns by Alexander Nasmyth, 1787

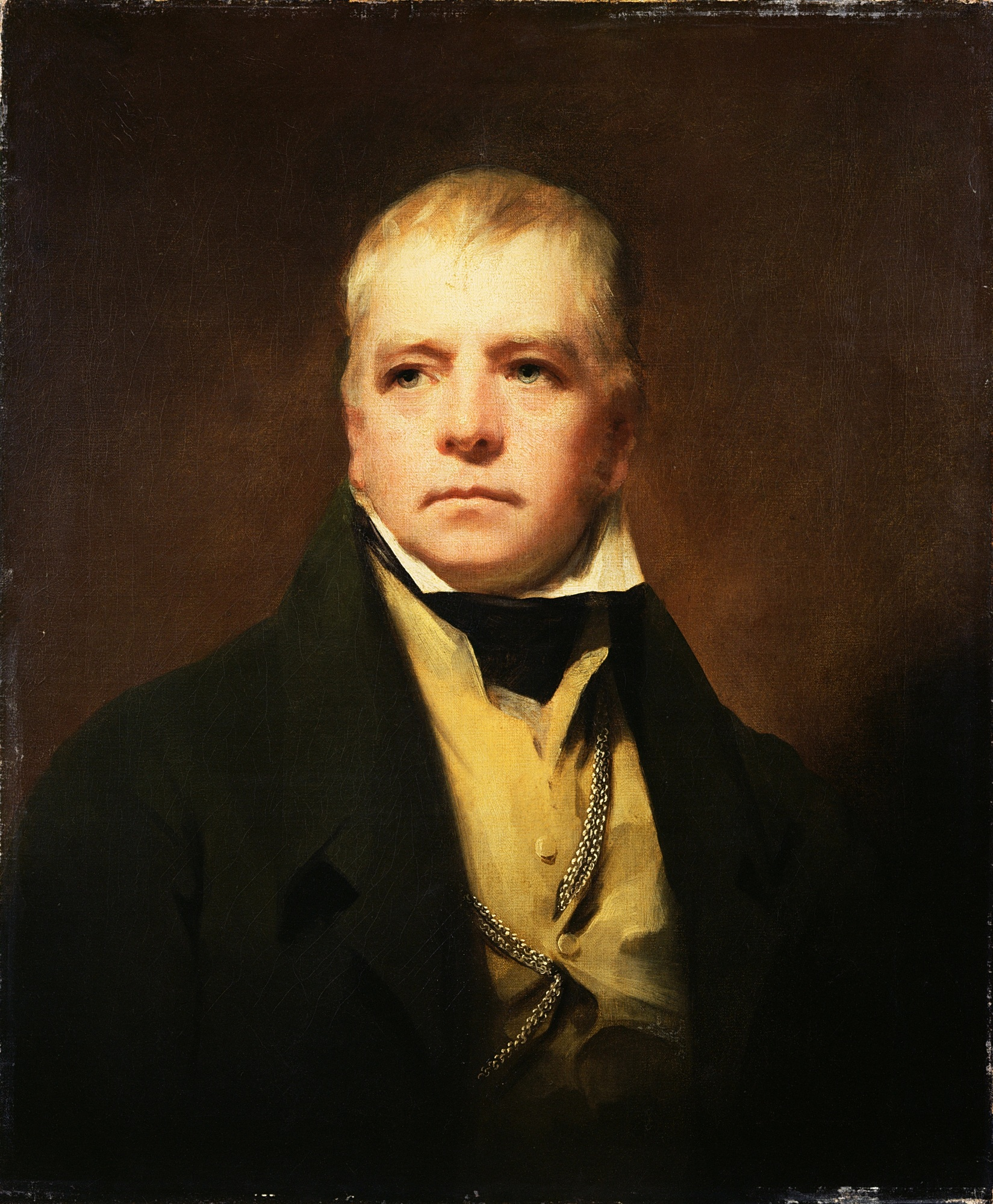
Henry Raeburn, Sir Walter Scott, 1822

The later 19th century in Scotland had no such dominant figures, but many fine artists, and saw the beginning of photography. The museum devotes a gallery to the photographs of Glasgow life taken by Thomas Annan, especially the images of slums taken in 1868–71, and in general the displays concentrate on the common people of Scotland. The collection continues to expand in the present day, with Scottish painters such as John Bellany (Peter Maxwell Davies, self-portrait and Billy Connolly) and John Byrne, whose works include images of himself, Tilda Swinton, Billy Connolly and Robbie Coltrane. It also includes portraits of medical professionals by Ken Currie, including Three Oncologists (2002), a painting of cancer researchers, and Unknown Man (2019), a painting of Sue Black, Baroness Black of Strome.

Other works in the collection include:

- James Hamilton, 1st Duke of Hamilton, by Daniel Mytens
- Douglas Douglas-Hamilton, 14th Duke of Hamilton, by Oskar Kokoschka
- Winnie Ewing by Norman Edgar
- Alex Ferguson by David Mach
- Ian Wilmut by Wendy McMurdo
- Robin Jenkins by Jennifer McRae
