= Calton weavers =

Community of handweavers

The Calton weavers were a community of handweavers established in the community of Calton, then in Lanarkshire just outside Glasgow, Scotland in the 18th century. In 1787 the weavers went on strike. Troops opened fire on the demonstrators and six weavers were killed. In the early 19th century, many of the weavers emigrated to Canada, settling in Carleton Place and other communities in eastern Ontario, where they continued their trade.

== Origins ==
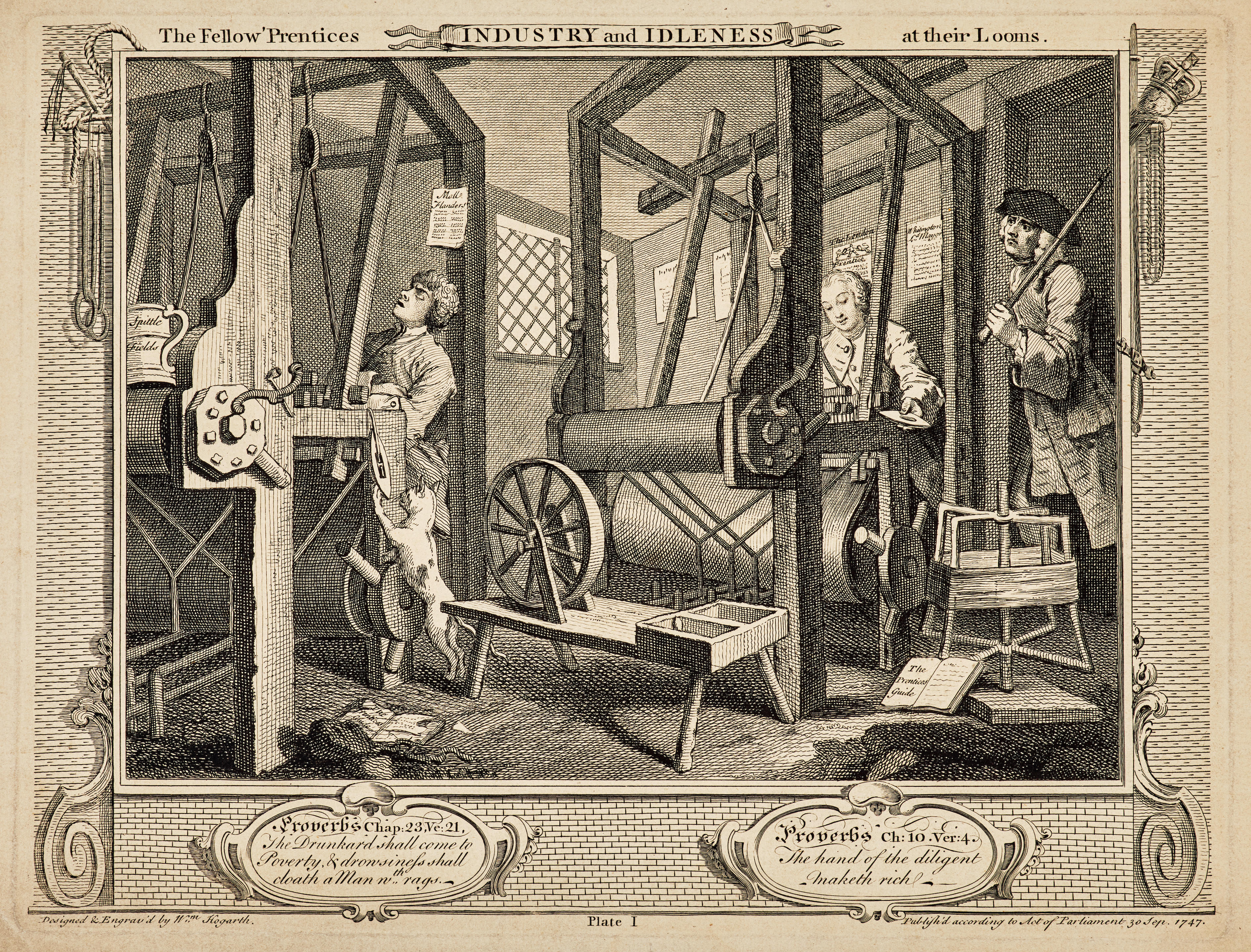
Handloom weaving in 1747, from William Hogarth's Industry and Idleness

In 1705, Walkinshaw of Barrowfield bought some pastureland from the community of Glasgow, then known by the name of Blackfauld, on which he started to establish a weaving village. Walkinshaw was involved in the 1715 Jacobite rising, which ruined him. Glasgow Town Council reacquired the land in 1723, naming the area Calton, a name retained when Glasgow sold Calton to the Orr family in 1730. The land lay on the east bank of the River Clyde just upstream of Glasgow. Although close to the center of modern Glasgow, Calton was an independent village, later a municipal burgh, that was not incorporated in the city of Glasgow until 1846.

The newly formed weaving settlement of Calton was beyond the reach of the Glasgow weavers guild. On 23 February 1725 an agreement was recorded between the weavers of Glasgow and the weavers of Calton and Blackfaulds to regulate and control the industry, to ensure good standards of craftmanship and to prevent destructive competition. The agreement involved payment. As late as 1830, the weavers in Calton were paying the weavers of Glasgow five groats out of every loom, and thirty pounds Scots yearly.

The technology of weaving improved throughout eighteenth century, while remaining accessible to the master weaver working in his home. The quality of linen cloth became more uniform and productivity was higher. There was steady demand from Britain's North American and Caribbean colonists and slave plantations, protected from European competition. At the peak of Calton's prosperity after 1780, when the fly-shuttle was introduced, wages had risen to nearly £100 a year and weavers had risen to high places in society.

The handweavers and warpers of Calton were known for their clubs or friendly societies. The Calton book club was educational in intent, reflecting the aspirations of skilled workers just above the common laborer on the social scale. Other clubs were more concerned with issues such as wages and working conditions. Their descendants were much later to evolve into trade unions. The community appears to have been better administered than the neighboring city of Glasgow. As late as 1840 a study noted that the burgh of Calton was not exposed to the same degree of "animadversion" as Glasgow. The magistrates required that all lodging houses were licensed, and laid down sanitary regulations that were rigidly enforced. The streets were intersected with common sewers of the best description, which were kept very clean.

== Industrial Revolution ==
During the period between 1760 and 1830 the Lowland Clearances reduced demand for farm labour, forcing families to the cities to find work, usually in the mills. Life was hard; poverty, disease and desperation were rife. The displaced cottars had few skills other than weaving. They crowded the mills depressing wages. The end of the Napoleonic Wars in 1815 released soldiers into the workforce, increasing the problem. Irish immigrants also swelled the working population. By 1851, 23% of the population of Glasgow was Irish in origin. The Irish were blamed for crime and unemployment but, evidence of the time showed that, in fact, the Irish were more willing to work and less likely to seek relief than the Scots.

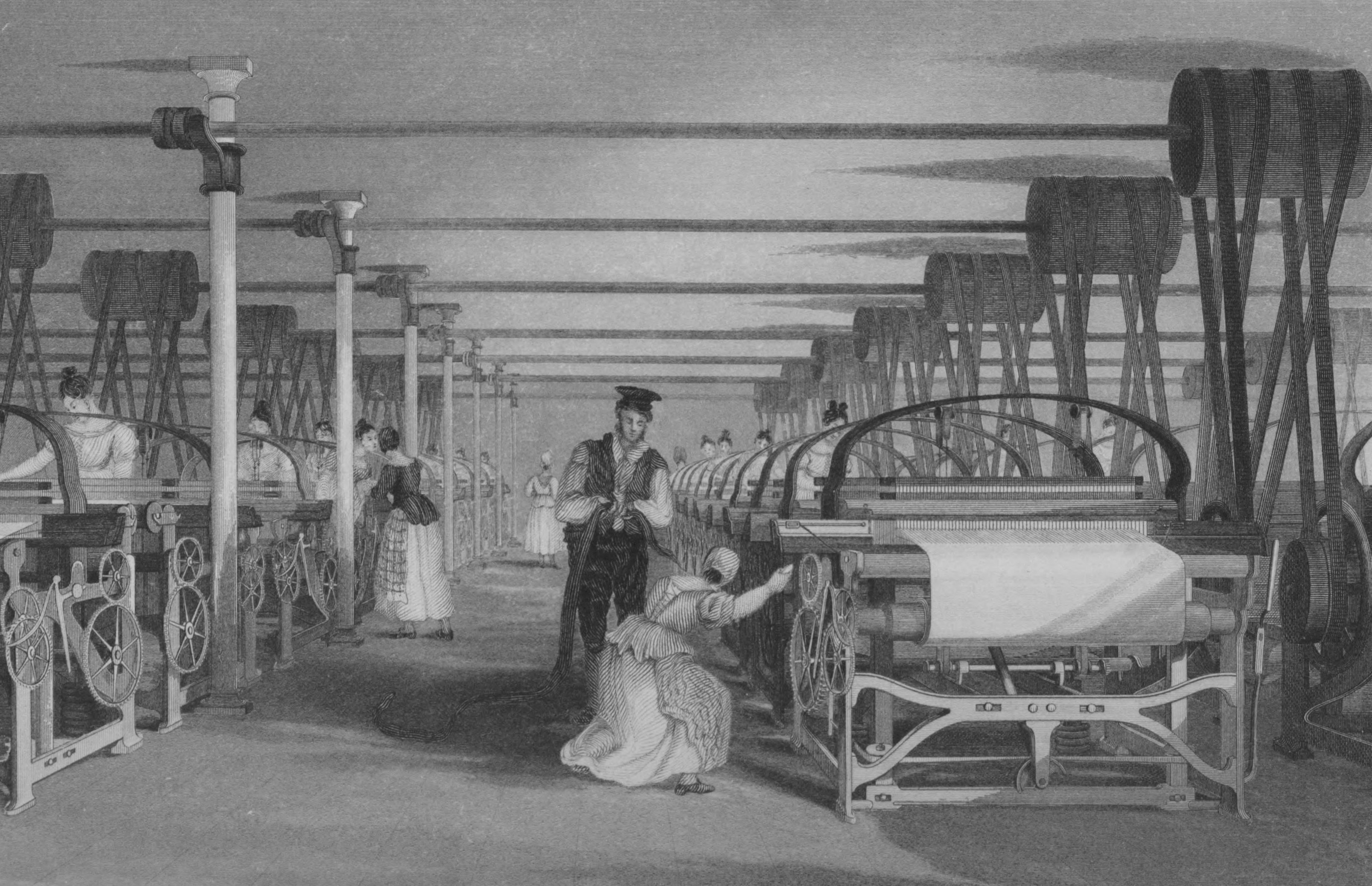
Illustration of power loom weaving in 1835, from History of the cotton manufacture in Great Britain by Edward Baines (1800–1890). An idealized view of women working in a clean and spacious environment.

From the later part of the 18th century, and accelerating in the 19th century, the weaving industry became increasingly mechanized. The flying shuttle halved the time to weave a piece, although it was not introduced to Scotland until the end of the 18th century. Steam-powered spinning mills were built starting in 1798. Power looms were used in Scottish linen weaving as early as 1810. Population growth and industrial mechanization combined to cause increasing social problems.

== Social problems ==
=== Calton weavers' strike ===
In the summer of 1787, the journeymen weavers of the Calton started to agitate for a wage increase. The dispute grew bitter, with the strikers cutting the webs from the looms of weavers who continued to work at the old rate, and making bonfires in the street from the contents of warehouses. On 3 September the city magistrates, with a force of officers, went to the Calton but were driven back by the mob. A detachment of the 39th Regiment marched, and a pitched battle occurred at Parkhouse, in Duke Street. The Riot Act was read, and a volley of musket fire killed three of the weavers and injured others. Further disturbances were quickly suppressed by the troops. This was the earliest major industrial dispute in Scottish history. The Calton weavers became Scotland's first working-class martyrs.

=== Nineteenth century ===
In October 1800 there were food riots in Calton. In 1816 a soup kitchen was established in Calton which led to a riot that again had to be put down by troops. By the 1830s the Calton handloom weavers were among the most destitute of the skilled working class. Not just men but women and children worked the looms in their struggle to survive. During the frequent depressions of that period many were forced to pawn their bedding and clothes to avoid starvation. Powerloom factories threatened the weavers. In 1816 two thousand rioters tried to destroy such factories in Calton and stoned the workers.

An 1812 inquiry into wages was told that 1792 regulations pricing weavers' work had not been adhered to. Wages had fallen from 18 shillings for six days work to 8 shillings. In 1834 an inquiry found that there was full employment but the large numbers meant that all were very poor. The average working day was said to be 13 hours, with 6 shillings 5 pence being earned for a six-day week, from which a frame rent of 1 shilling 5 pence was deducted. Although women had long worked as weavers, journeymen weavers regarded women as competition. In 1810 the Calton association of weavers had moved that no new female apprentices could be taken except from the weaver's own families. In June 1833, male cotton spinners struck against female spinners at Dennistoun's mill in Calton, using violent means to drive them from the workplace.

Children were frequently employed in the mills. The proprietor of a factory in New Lanark said that when he bought the mill he found 500 children working there, mostly between the ages of five and eight, who had been taken from the poor-houses. Although the children had been well fed and clothed, their growth was stunted in many cases. Another mill owner claimed that most of the children he employed, who were under the age of ten, had very poor parents. If they were deprived of work this would cause great hardship. A Factories Inquiry Commission of 1833 found that children working in the mills were often too tired to eat and, when woken in the morning, unable to dress themselves. Scotland was considered the worst area for child cruelty and their tiredness often caused serious accidents with the machinery.

A writer in the 1840s said that "the religious, moral and intellectual conditions of the weavers were long of a very high grade ... but as poverty prevents many of them from attending public worship, and still more from educating their children, there can be little doubt that their character is fast deteriorating, and that their children will be in a still more deplorable condition." A report on the state of the burgh of Calton presented by a magistrate to the British Association described high levels of pilfering, including the bowl weft system generally carried on by weavers and winders. These workers embezzled cotton yarns, silks, etc. and sold them to small manufacturers to eke out their wages by an amount estimated at one penny per day for each man.

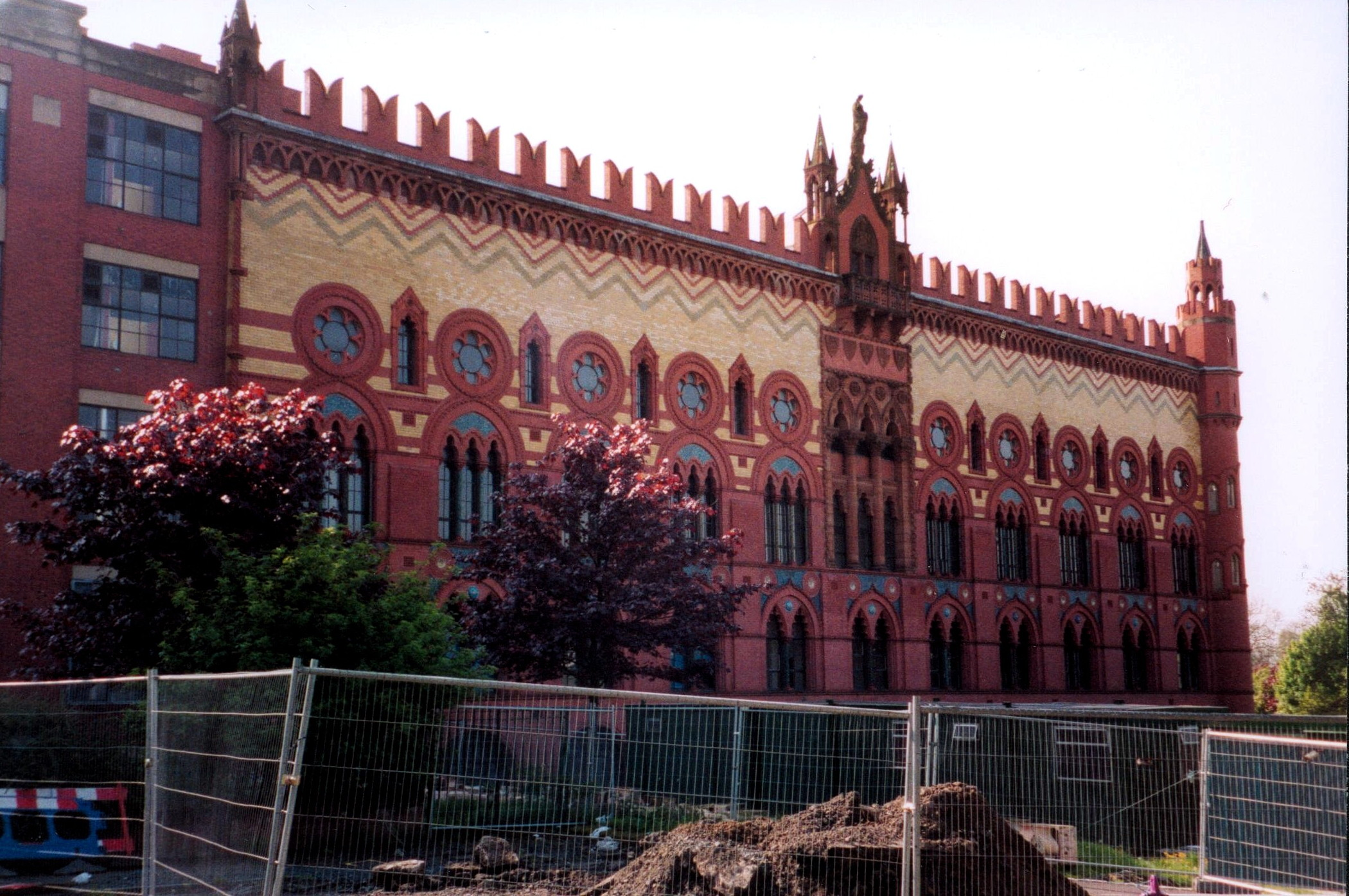
The Templeton's Carpet Factory in the Calton, opened in 1892, designed to resemble the Doge's Palace in Venice. During its construction, on 1 November 1889, part of a wall collapsed. Over 100 women working in the weaving sheds at the back were trapped and 29 were killed.

With the incorporation into Glasgow of 1846, the later history of Calton and its weavers is part of Glasgow's history. The city expanded further and the textile mills, clothing factories and dyeworks enlarged together with carpet-making and leather works. Exporting was greatly enabled by new shipping lines using the deepened River Clyde. The city also diversified into heavy industries like shipbuilding, locomotive construction and other engineering that could thrive on nearby supplies of coal and iron ore.

== Migration ==
The Scottish weaver communities formed many emigration societies, seeking for government assistance. They were granted some help with their passage and free land in the Rideau Valley, a strategically important part of Upper Canada where the government was anxious to settle loyal Scots. Nearly three thousand people were helped to emigrate in 1820 and 1821, founding the Lanark Settlements in what is now Lanark County to the north of Perth, Ontario. There are many Scottish place names such as Perth, Glengarry, Lanark and Renfrew along the Rideau and in the small lake area north of Kingston. The majority of the first settlers came from the overpopulated towns and countryside of Lanarkshire and Glasgow. Many of them found work in the newly opened woolen mills in the area.

== In popular culture ==
The Calton weavers massacre of 1787 is commemorated in a panel by Scottish artist Ken Currie in the People's Palace, Glasgow commissioned on the 200th anniversary of the event. The song "The Calton Weaver" is a variant of "Nancy Whiskey", which first appeared in print in the early 1900s. The Scottish folksinger Nancy Whiskey took her name from the song, and it has been recorded by many other artists including Ewan MacColl. The song tells of a Calton weaver who spent his life savings on whisky. The song ends with a solemn caution:

Come all ye weavers, Calton weavers
A' ye weavers where'er ye be
Beware of whiskey, Nancy Whiskey
She'll ruin you as she ruined me.

The Clancy Brothers and Tommy Makem released a version of "Nancy Whisky" on their seventh album for Columbia Records, Isn't It Grand Boys (1966). The Alaska based Celtic rock band Fire on McGinnis released their version of "Nancy Whiskey" on their debut album, Fire on McGinnis (2012). Shane MacGowan and The Popes also included a version of "Nancy Whiskey" on the album The Snake (1995).

== See also ==
- Child labour
- Textile manufacture during the Industrial Revolution
