= Marion Bernstein =

British poet

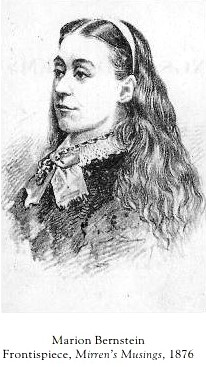
- Born: 16 September 1846; London
- Died: 6 February 1906 (aged 59); Glasgow, Scotland
- Occupation: Poet
- Years active: 1870s
- Known for: Radical & feminist poetry
- Notable work: Mirren's Musings (1876)

Marion Bernstein (16 September 1846- 6 February 1906) was a poet whose verse included darkly humorous poems that asserted women's rights. Most of her published work was printed in newspapers in Glasgow, most notably the Glasgow Weekly Mail. In 1876, her only published book of poetry, Mirren's Musings, was published. Bernstein's poetry has been included in several critical studies of Scottish poetry since the 1990s.

== Biography ==
Bernstein was born in London in 1846. Her father, Theodore Bernstein, was an Eastern European Jew who immigrated to England sometime in the 1830s. He married Marion's Christian mother, Lydia Pulsford, in London in 1843; Marion was the middle child of three. Although the family retained their Jewish surname they identified as Christian. At age 13, Marion became unwell. Her illness was chronicled in an autobiographical poem, titled Mirren's Autobiography, published in 1880. It is impossible to know the exact cause of her infirmity but it has been asserted that she probably suffered from polio. She continued to experience symptoms of fatigue and impaired mobility throughout her adult life.

Her early life must also have been affected by the hospitalization of her father in an insane asylum and his early death in 1859. His widow moved the family to the Sussex coast and most likely supported them by becoming a seaside landlady. By 1874, they had moved to Glasgow, probably because Marion's older sister (also called Lydia) had married Benjamin Malyon who became the owner of a small Glasgow printing company. In Glasgow, Marion supported herself by teaching piano. She remained in the city until her death.

Towards the end of her life and following the death of her mother and brother-in-law, Marion lived with her older sister and the two made a living as music teachers. In 1901 they had a joke at the expense of the census enumerator when they recorded themselves as professors - with Marion styling herself as a 'professor of theory and harmony'. When increasing ill health prevented her from working, she eked an existence on two small pensions from charitable sources.

== Poetry ==
Bernstein's poetry highlighted the everyday vicissitudes of female experience, including domestic violence and the demands placed on women to be ideal wives and mothers, but it often treated these serious subjects with a degree of humour. Notably, she asserted women's right to the franchise, well ahead of the UK-wide campaigning which a few decades later achieved such a high profile. Much of her work was published in newspapers printed in Glasgow, most notably the Glasgow Weekly Mail. The poetry editor of the paper looked on her favourably, which suggests she had a keen readership despite the sometimes controversial subjects with which she dealt. It was in that newspaper that she began to be referred to as "Mirren". In her correspondence with the editor of the Mail and with other newspaper poets, she proved a formidable advocate for women's rights. Often cited in this context is her sparring with the working-class poet Jessie Russell on the subject of the female franchise. Such writing amply displayed a combative spirit, which was undimmed by disability and the hardships of her early life. Her poems published in the press mostly commented on current affairs. Regularly her verses concerned themselves with social issues of the day, such as crofters' rights.

Her only published book of poetry, Mirren's Musings, was published in 1876 and included work with a more serious tone than the ones published in the newspapers. She did have other interests that she expressed in her poetry, for example she was religious and many of her poems are concerned with aspects of her Christian faith. The poems in Mirren's Musings were written during a period of severely impaired mobility.

Interest in Bernstein was revived following her inclusion in Tom Leonard's Radical Renfrew, an edited collection of poems by Scottish writers who had been largely forgotten. This interest increased when her work was covered by Elspeth King in The Hidden History of Glasgow's Women. Leonard commented on Marion's capacity for expressing idiosyncratic opinions. For example, in her 1878 poem 'The Govan Rivetter's Strike', Bernstein was critical of a strike called by a group of Clydeside shipbuilders, leading Leonard to remark that a: 'radical in one tradition might be conservative in another'. Bernstein, though a pioneering feminist and someone whose writing often expressed sympathy for the poor and dispossessed, nevertheless was politically orthodox in other ways—certainly, she failed to support the striking shipyard workers in print.

== Legacy ==
After the revival of her work in the 1990s, Bernstein's poetry was included in several critical studies of Scottish poetry, such as Mungo’s Tongues, Glasgow Poets Past and Present, A History of Scottish Women’s Writing, The New Penguin Book of Scottish Verse, and The Edinburgh History of Scottish Literature. However, a significant portion of her work remained unpublished until 2013 when her poems were collected in a single volume. These were published as A Song of Glasgow Town. This collection includes poems from Mirren's Musings, as well as several poems published elsewhere and fifteen previously unpublished works. Without doubt, her main legacy lies with her verse on feminist themes, especially those arguing for the right to vote. An oft-quoted work is her fantasy piece A Dream published in Mirren's Musings (p.101) in which she promotes political equality for women:

I dreamt that the nineteenth century

Had entirely passed away,

And had given place to a more advanced

And very much brighter day.

For Woman’s Rights were established quite,

And man could the fact discern

That he’d long been teaching his grandmamma

What she didn’t require to learn.

There were female chiefs in the Cabinet,

(Much better than males I’m sure!)

And the Commons were three-parts feminine,

While the Lords were seen no more!

In 2008, the Scottish Poetry Library reproduced an extract from her verse Wanted A Husband, on a postcard issued for National Poetry Day, as follows:

Wanted a husband who doesn’t suppose,

That all earthly employments one feminine knows, –

That she’ll scrub, do the cleaning, and cooking, and baking,

And plain needlework, hats and caps, and dressmaking.

Do the family washing, yet always look neat,

Mind the bairns, with a temper unchangeably sweet,

Be a cheerful companion, whenever desired,

and contentedly toil day and night, if required.

Men expecting as much, one may easily see,

But they’re not what is wanted, at least, not by me.

This poem was originally published in the Glasgow Weekly Mail in 1874 and like much of her punchier verse was a response to the work of another poet who was seeking an ideal wife with glowing domestic credentials! Marion Bernstein never married. Her surviving poetry demonstrates that despite the many disadvantages she experienced, she was a woman unafraid to express and defend her opinions. She died of breast cancer in 1906, survived only by her older, widowed sister.

== Selected works ==
- Bernstein, Marion (1876). Mirren's Musings. Glasgow.

== See also ==
- List of feminist poets
