= Elspeth King =

Scottish curator and historian (1949–2025)

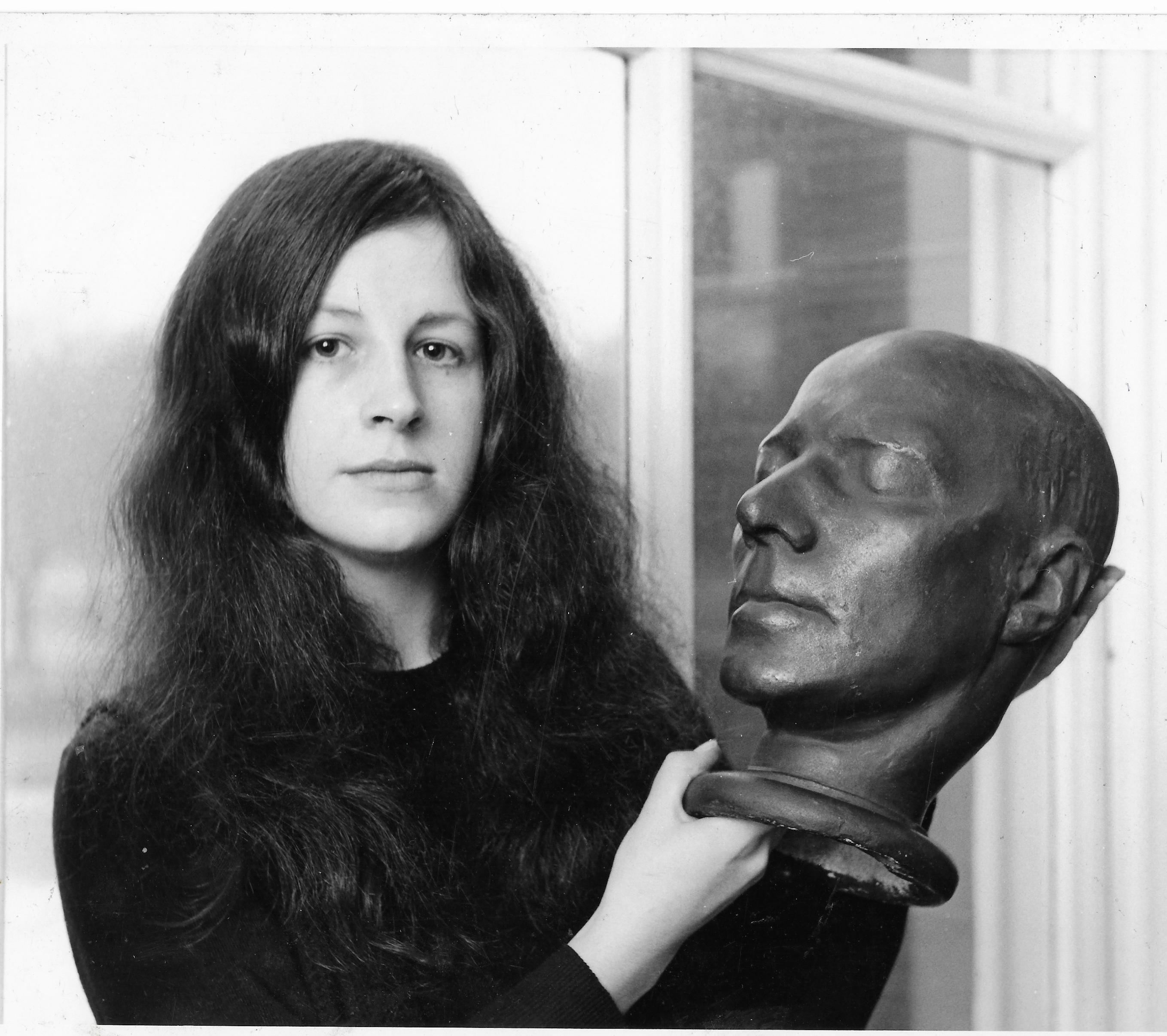
- King in 1975, holding a bust of Robert Owen (1771–1858), co-operator and reformer
- Born: 29 March 1949; Lochore, Fife, Scotland
- Died: 1 November 2025 (aged 76)
- Education: University of St. Andrews, University of Leicester
- Occupations: Social historian, curator and writer
- Known for: Curator at People's Palace, Glasgow and Director of the Stirling Smith Art Gallery and Museum

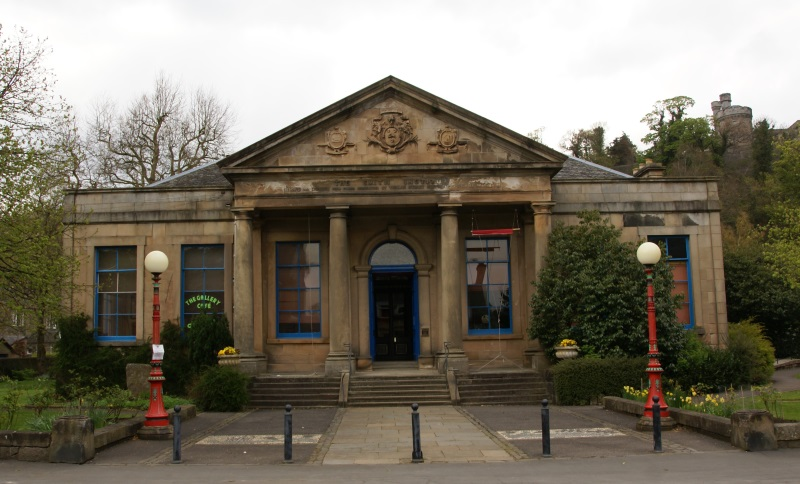
Stirling Smith Museum, of which Dr. King was Director

Elspeth Russell King (29 March 1949 – 1 November 2025)—her full name is also reported as Elspeth Cowie King—was a Scottish curator, writer and social historian, known for her role as curator of social history at the People's Palace Museum in Glasgow, as Director of the Stirling Smith Art Gallery and Museum, and for her scholarship on the Scottish women's suffrage movement.

== Life and career ==
King was born into a mining family in Lochore, Fife, on 29 March 1949. Her parents were William and Christina (born Cowie) King and she attended Beath High School in Fife. She studied Medieval History at University of St Andrews, graduating with First Class Honours. She went on to complete a post-graduate course in Museum Studies at University of Leicester.

In 1974, King joined the People's Palace in Glasgow as a curator, and remained there for the next sixteen years. During her tenure exhibitions such as Scotland Sober and Free, the 150th anniversary of the Temperance Movement, and the exhibition her colleague and romantic partner Michael Donnelly curated from his own collection of stained glass in 1981, gained record attendances. The People's Palace won European Museum of the Year in 1981 and the British Museum of the Year award in 1983. King championed the inclusion of objects that were not traditional items for museums. She defended her inclusion of Billy Connolly's Banana Boots that he first wore in 1975. They became one of the museum's most popular items. She felt that they represented Glasgow's irreverence.

Her pet cat Smudge became very well known in Glasgow during her time working there.

In 1990, King was passed over for the civic post of keeper of social history. This decision was considered controversial by many, and was the subject of an appeal under the council's grievance process.

King left Glasgow to take on the role of director of the Dunfermline Heritage Trust, where she helped to oversee the restoration as a heritage centre of Abbot House, the oldest secular building in the town.

In 1994, King joined the Smith Art Gallery Museum in Stirling as its first director, where she remained until her retirement in August 2018. The museum had been threatened with closure earlier in the year due to funding cuts. However, a petition was mounted to combat this decision and gained over 7000 signatures after which the museum received a reprieve.

King died on 1 November 2025, at the age of 76.

== Honours ==
King was made an Honorary Doctor of the University of Stirling in 2005 for her "outstanding work in developing Scottish museums and in promoting Scottish history and culture".

== Written works ==
- The Scottish Women's Suffrage Movement / ... compiled by Elspeth King to accompany the Government sponsored "Right to Vote" exhibition organised to commemorate the 50th anniversary of the Representation of the People Act, from 9 September- 7 October 1978. Peoples Palace Museum, Glasgow Green (1978)
- Scotland Sober and Free: the Temperance Movement, 1829-1979. Glasgow Museums and Art Galleries (1979)
- Papers of the Glasgow and West of Scotland Association for Women's Suffrage : an introduction. Peoples Palace Museum, Glasgow Green (1980)
- Barapatter. Friends of the Peoples's Palace (1983)
- Peter Fyfe, Photographer, in Hearn, Sheila G. (ed.), Cencrastus No. 14, Autumn 1983, pp. 10 – 15, ISSN 0264-0856
- Images of Glasgow, a review of Noise and Smokey Breath edited by Hamish Whyte, in Hearn, Sheila G. (ed.), Cencrastus No. 14, Autumn 1983, ISSN 0264-0856
- Provand's Lordship : the oldest house in Glasgow. City of Glasgow District Council (1984)
- St Nicholas' Hospital in Glasgow. Glasgow Museums and Art Galleries (1984)
- The strike of the Glasgow weavers 1787. Glasgow Museums and Art Galleries (1987)
- The People's Palace and Glasgow Green. Richard Drew Publishing (1991)
- People's Pictures: the story of tiles in Glasgow (1991)
- The hidden history of Glasgow's women : the Thenew factor. Mainstream Publishing (1993)
- Introducing William Wallace. Firtree (1997)
- The Wallace Muse: Poems and Artworks Inspired by the Life and Legend of William Wallace.(with Lesley Duncan). Luath Press (2005)
- Old Stirling. Stenlake (2009)
- A History of Stirling in 100 Objects The History Press (2011)
