= Smudge =

Smudge may refer to:

== Cats ==
- Smudge (Blue Peter cat), one of the Blue Peter pets
- Smudge (meme cat), from the woman yelling at a cat internet meme
- Smudge (People's Palace cat), the Glasgow People's Palace cat

== Other uses ==
- Smudge (band), an Australian band
- Smudge (comics), a character in The Beano
- Smudge (film), 1922 American silent comedy-drama
- Smudge (Monica's Gang), a character in Monica's Gang
- Smudge, a former name of the American band Kilgore (band)

== See also ==
- Smudge attack, touchscreen information extraction method
- Smudge pot, oil-burning device used to prevent frost on fruit trees
- Smudging, a ceremony practiced by some Indigenous peoples of the Americas
