= Calton weavers' strike =

1787 industrial dispute in Scotland

The Calton weavers' strike of 1787 was the earliest major industrial dispute in Scottish history, when troops fired on demonstrators, killing six. The Calton weavers became Scotland's first working-class martyrs. Ultimately the strike contributed to a workers movement which achieved fundamental changes in the relationship between workforce and employers. The Calton Weavers massacre of 1787 is commemorated in a panel by Scottish artist Ken Currie in the People's Palace, Glasgow, commissioned on the 200th anniversary of the event.

Calton at the time of the strike was a handweaving community just outside Glasgow in Scotland. At the peak of Calton's prosperity, wages had risen to nearly £100 a year and weavers had risen to high places in society. However, mechanization and growth in the labor force had since then severely depressed wages.

In the summer of 1787, the journeymen weavers of Calton marched in organized processions through the streets of Glasgow to protest a 25 percent wage cut and lockout. The dispute grew bitter, with the strikers cutting the webs from the looms of weavers who continued to work, and making bonfires in the street from the contents of warehouses. On 3 September the city magistrates, with a force of officers, went to the Calton but were driven back by the mob. A detachment of the 39th Regiment marched under the command of Lieutenant Colonel Kellet, and a pitched battle occurred at Parkhouse, in Duke Street. A volley of musket fire killed three of the weavers. Three other weavers were mortally wounded. Further disturbances later in the day were quickly suppressed by the troops. On the following day more looms were wrecked, but the riots quickly subsided.

In 1788 James Granger was tried in Edinburgh as the ringleader of the strike. He was aged 38, married and had six children. He was found guilty of "forming illegal combinations" and was sentenced to be publicly whipped through the streets of the city at the hands of the Common Executioner, and then to banish himself from Scotland for seven years. James Granger later returned and took part in the 1811–1812 strike. He lived to the age of 75.
