= Unknown Man =

2019 painting by Ken Currie

Unknown Man is a 2019 painting by the Scottish artist Ken Currie, depicting forensic anthropologist Sue Black. The painting has been on display at the Scottish National Portrait Gallery in Edinburgh as part of its The Modern Portrait exhibition.

== Context ==
Black is a forensic anthropologist born in Inverness in 1961. She is known for her work in the field of human identification, working to identify victims of wars and natural disasters such as the Yugoslav Wars, the Iraq War and the 2004 Indian Ocean earthquake and tsunami. After establishing the Centre for Anatomy and Human Identification at the University of Dundee, Black went on to become head of the Royal Anthropological Institute of Great Britain and Ireland.

Currie, born in North Shields in 1960 and raised in Barrhead, studied at the Glasgow School of Art, and during the 1980s became known as one of the New Glasgow Boys, known for his paintings depicting themes of mortality, the human body, rituals and medical practice. During the late 1990s, Currie began using the imagery of decomposing bodies in his work in response to wars in Eastern Europe, including in Kosovo, where coincidentally Black had worked in 1999 to identify victims of war crimes committed during the Kosovo War.

Black and Currie first met while appearing on a BBC Radio 4 panel show, The Anatomy Lesson, in 2018, which explored the relationship between art and anatomy. Currie accepted an invitation to watch Black carry out a dissection at the Centre for Anatomy and Human Identification in Dundee, subsequently becoming so moved by the experience that he offered to paint a portrait of Black, an art form he was not particularly known for.

== Description ==
Currie's initial concept of what would become Unknown Man, envisioned after observing Black carry out a dissection, was of an image of "just [Black] and the body". Due to Black's limited availability, she was only able to complete one sitting for Currie at his studio in Glasgow; to address this, Currie made a life mask of Black. Currie used the life mask to put Black's face under different lighting, wanting to portray how she would look after "a long and tiresome 12-hour shift... haunted by what she had seen but still fiercely guarding the body she is looking after, until the work is done".

Unknown Man depicts Black in surgical robes, standing behind a cadaver covered with a surgical sheet on a table, with an orange bucket placed underneath it. Currie had initially planned for the cadaver to be uncovered, wishing to give it the face of the "Unknown Man", an unidentified death mask on display at the Scottish National Portrait Gallery, with the idea that it would be looking at Black; he ultimately scrapped this idea, stating "it got too complicated". In the final painting, the cadaver remains covered, while Black is painting staring at the viewer through "bloodshot" eyes. The objects in the painting – Black, the cadaver, and an orange bucket, which Currie had purchased for one GBP from B&Q – are arranged in an axis, with Black's red hair in the upper part of the image echoed by the orange bucket on the lower part. The final painting stands at almost three metres tall.

While Currie ultimately did not incorporate the "Unknown Man" death mask into the finished painting, he still named the portrait Unknown Man, stating he did so to make the viewer consider the person underneath the sheet; as well as to draw attention to Black's work identifying unidentified human remains. Unknown Man is often also an artistic title given retrospectively to portraits where the subject remains unknown. Currie identified Unknown Man as a companion piece to his 2002 painting Three Oncologists, which depicted RJ Steele, Alfred Cuschieri and David Lane, three cancer researchers at the University of Dundee.

== Reception ==
Unknown Man was originally obtained by Flowers Gallery, before being offered by Currie to the Scottish National Portrait Gallery on a long-term loan upon its reopening in 2021. Unknown Man is displayed as part of the gallery's The Modern Portrait exhibition, alongside Three Oncologists. Currie stated he hoped the painting's display at the Scottish National Portrait Gallery, which has no entry cost, would inspire more women to enter the field of anatomy and forensic anthropology. In 2023, the Scottish National Portrait Gallery acquired the painting fully, with support from the Heinz Fund, the Art Fund and Vivienne and Robin Menzies.

Christopher Baker, the director of Scottish and European Art for the Scottish National Gallery, described Black's glaze in the painting as reflecting "strength and fragility in equal measures", describing it as having a "confrontational quality". Following its opening at the Scottish National Portrait Gallery, Black stated she had been "moved to tears" when she saw Unknown Man for the first time, stating her focus was on "the unidentified man, [the] job, the skills and the experience needed to do the job [to] reunite him with his family". Laura Waddell, writing for The Scotsman, described Unknown Man as "every bit as haunting [as] Three Oncologists".

The National Galleries of Scotland's permanent acquisition of the painting in 2023 was positively received in the Scottish press for its promotion and preservation of modern Scottish art.
