= Smudge (People's Palace cat) =

Cat at the People's Palace museum, Glasgow

- Species: Felis catus
- Born: c. 1970
- Died: 2000
- Owner: Elspeth King

Smudge (died 2000) was a Scottish cat who became a minor celebrity in Glasgow. She was employed by the People's Palace museum in Glasgow Green to deal with a rodent problem in 1979.

Smudge then became a fixture of the museum, which sold Smudge merchandise including ceramic replicate real life sculptures designed by noted potter Margery Clinton. In the 1980s, Smudge became a full blue-collar member of Branch 29 of the General, Municipal and Boilermakers Trade Union, after NALGO refused her admission as a blue-collar worker. Smudge was used as a mascot for several campaigns including 'Save the Glasgow Vet School' (1989), 'Paws Off Glasgow Green' (1990). In 1987, Smudge disappeared for a number of weeks, but after many appeals (including one by the Lord Provost of Glasgow) she was recovered.

Smudge left the People's Palace in 1990 with the departure of Elspeth King, the museum's curator. When Elspeth became director of Stirling's Stirling Smith Art Gallery and Museum, Smudge was called on again to deal with a rodent problem. Smudge died at her home in 2000 after a long illness. A plaque is now dedicated to the memory of Sister Smudge at one of the side entrances to the People's Palace; it reads:

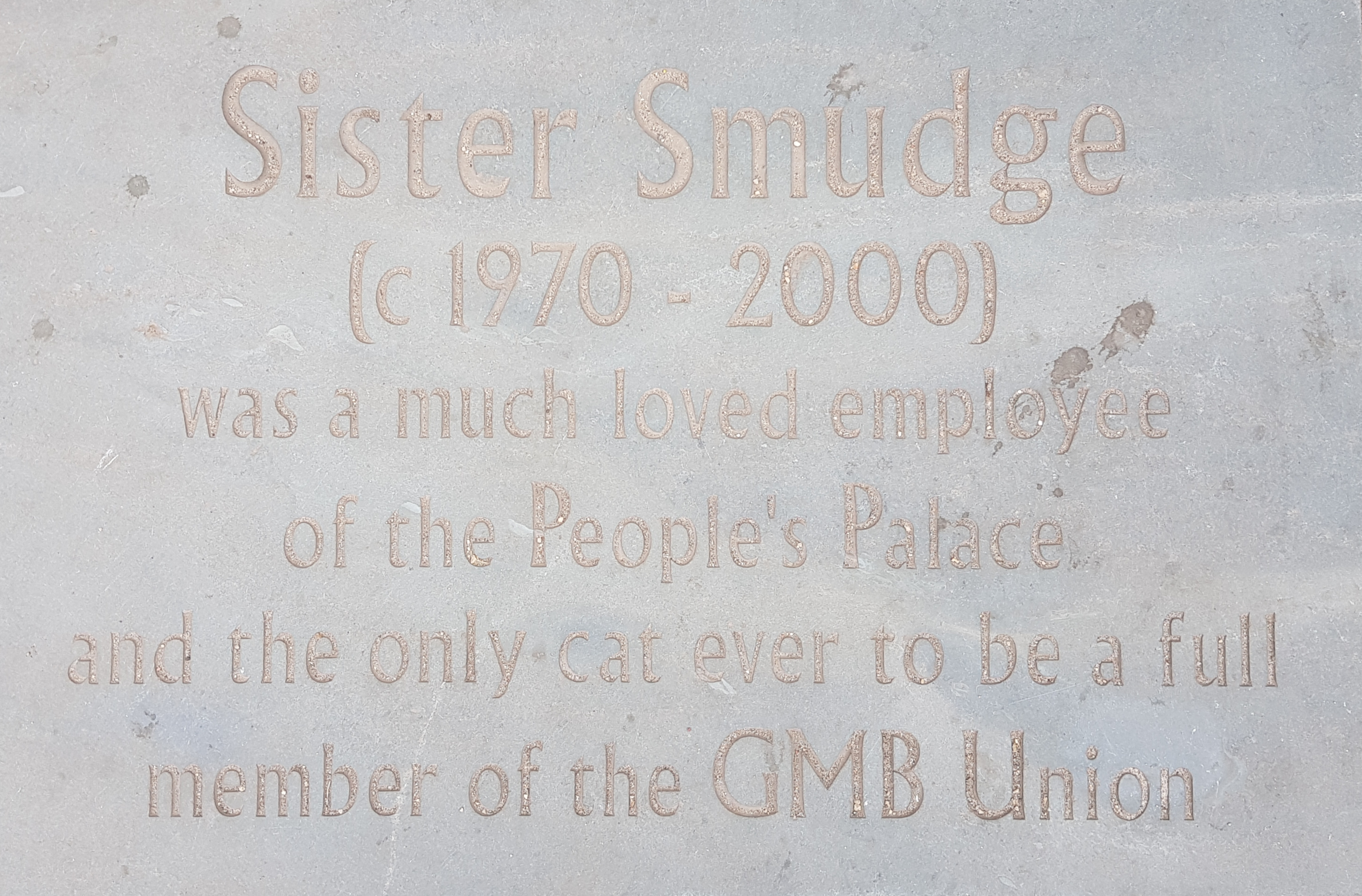
Plaque dedicated to Smudge outside the People's Palace

Sister Smudge
(c 1970 – 2000)
was a much loved employee
of the People's Palace
and the only cat to be a full
member of the GMB Union

== See also ==
- List of individual cats
