= Sue Black, Baroness Black of Strome =

Scottish forensic anthropologist (born 1961)

The Right Honourable The Baroness Black of Strome LT DBE FRS FRCP FRSE FRAI FRSB
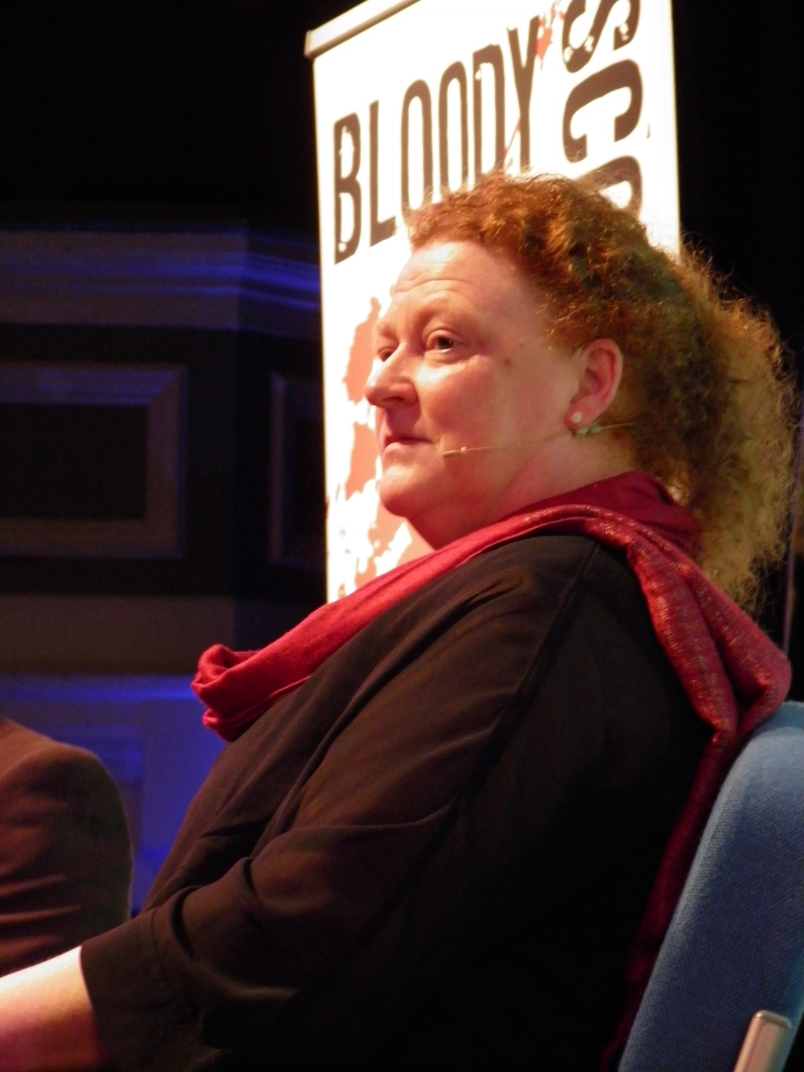
- Black at the Bloody Scotland International Crime Writing Festival, 2017

Member of the House of Lords
- Lord Temporal
- Life peerage 26 April 2021

Personal details
- Born: Susan Margaret Gunn; 7 May 1961 (age 65) Inverness, Scotland
- Party: None (crossbencher)
- Children: 3
- Education: University of Aberdeen
- Scientific career
- Awards: Lucy Mair Medal, Royal Anthropological Institute; police commendation for DVI training; Brian Cox Award for Public Engagement, University of Aberdeen (2009); Stephen Fry Award for Public Engagement with Research, University of Dundee (2012); Queen's Anniversary Award for Higher Education (2013); Royal Society Wolfson Research Merit Award (2014); Life peer
- Fields: Forensic anthropology; Anatomy; Forensic science
- Workplaces: St Thomas' Hospital; University of Dundee; University of Aberdeen; Lancaster University
- Thesis: Identification from the Human Skeleton (1986)

Susan Margaret Black, Baroness Black of Strome (née Gunn; born 7 May 1961) is a Scottish forensic anthropologist, anatomist and academic. She was the Pro Vice-Chancellor for Engagement at Lancaster University and is past President of the Royal Anthropological Institute of Great Britain and Ireland. From 2003 to 2018 she was Professor of Anatomy and Forensic Anthropology at the University of Dundee. She is President of St John's College, Oxford.

She was inducted into the Order of the Thistle in Edinburgh on 3 July 2024.

Black has been named as the new Chancellor of Anglia Ruskin University (ARU).

== Early life and education ==
Susan Margaret Gunn was born on 7 May 1961 in Inverness, Scotland. She was educated at Inverness Royal Academy, a state secondary school in Inverness. She then attended the University of Aberdeen from which she graduated with a Bachelor of Science (BSc) degree with honours in Human Anatomy in 1982, and a Doctor of Philosophy (PhD) degree for her thesis on "Identification from the Human Skeleton" in 1986.

== Career and research ==
In 1987, she was appointed a lecturer in Anatomy at St Thomas' Hospital, London, which started her career in forensic anthropology, serving in this role until 1992.

Between 1992 and 2003, she undertook contract work variously for the Foreign and Commonwealth Office (FCO) and the United Nations involving the identification of victims and perpetrators of various conflicts. In 1999, she became the lead forensic anthropologist to the British Forensic Team in Kosovo, deployed by the FCO on behalf of the United Nations, and later that year deployed to Sierra Leone and Grenada.

In 2003, she undertook two tours to Iraq. In 2005, she participated in the United Kingdom's contribution to the Thai Tsunami Victim Identification operation (jointly led by the Thai and Australian Disaster Victim Identification (DVI) teams) as part of the 2004 Indian Ocean earthquake and tsunami international response.

In 2003, Black was appointed Professor of Anatomy and Forensic Anthropology at the University of Dundee. In 2005, she created the Centre for Anatomy and Human Identification at the University of Dundee (CAHID), which runs undergraduate courses in forensic anthropology and postgraduate courses in anatomy and advanced forensic anthropology. Her department trained the UK National Disaster Victim Identification (UK DVI) team for police and scientists in advanced mortuary practices.

Black has been an innovator in developing techniques and building databases to confirm or disconfirm someone's identity based on photographs of their hands or arms. This technique has become important for the prosecution of paedophiles, who often take and share photographs of their actions. In 2009, Black used vein pattern analysis to confirm the identity of a suspected child abuser, who then pleaded guilty. It was the first time that the technique was used in a criminal conviction.

Black was a Director of the Centre for International Forensic Assistance and a founder of the British Association for Human Identification and the British Association for Forensic Anthropology.

In June 2018, Black left Dundee for Lancaster University, where she had been appointed pro-vice-chancellor for engagement. On 23 July 2021, it was announced that she had been elected the next President of St John's College, Oxford.

=== House of Lords ===
In 2021, she was appointed to the House of Lords as a crossbencher life peer. On 26 April 2021, she was created Baroness Black of Strome, of Strome in the County of Ross-shire.

On 15 June 2021, she made her maiden speech in the Lords during a debate on the Skills and Post-16 Education Bill.

=== Media ===
Black starred in BBC Two's History Cold Case, which aired two series between 2010 and 2011. In February 2013, she was assessed as one of the 100 Most Powerful Women in the UK by BBC Radio 4's Woman's Hour and in 2014 was also subject of The Life Scientific on the same station. In 2014, she appeared in the documentary After the Wave: Ten years since the Boxing Day Tsunami examining the forensic response in Thailand to the 2004 Indian Ocean earthquake and tsunami.

In October 2015, Black was the guest for BBC Radio 4's Desert Island Discs. Her choices include The Corries, Glenn Miller, Gerry Rafferty, Dire Straits and Cher. Her favourite was "Highland Cathedral" by Lathallan School. In July 2018, Black was the guest on the BBC's Hard Talk.

Black delivered the 2022 series of Royal Institution Christmas Lectures, with the title "Secrets of Forensic Science".

In April 2024 (repeated March 2025), Black contributed to the BBC Radio 3 series Private Passions, outlining the relationship among her life, her work, and the music she enjoys.

== Personal life ==
Sue and Tom Black attended the same school. They have two daughters. Black also has an older daughter from her first marriage to Ian MacLaughlin.

She is patron of a number of charities including Locate International, Escape2Make and Archaeology Scotland.

== Awards and honours ==
- In 2001, Black was appointed Officer of the Order of the British Empire (OBE) for her services to forensic anthropology in Kosovo. She was promoted to Dame Commander of the same Order (DBE) in the 2016 Birthday Honours for services to forensic anthropology.
- 2005: Black was elected a Fellow of the Royal Society of Edinburgh (FRSE), a Fellow of the Royal Anthropological Institute (FRAI), a Fellow of the Royal College of Physicians (FRCP) and an Honorary Fellow of the Royal College of Physicians and Surgeons of Glasgow.
- 2008: she was awarded the Lucy Mair Medal from the Royal Anthropological Institute. and a police commendation for DVI training.
- 2009: she was awarded the University of Aberdeen's Brian Cox Award for Public Engagement.
- 2012: Black and her team at the Centre for Anatomy and Human Identification were awarded the University of Dundee's Stephen Fry Award for Public Engagement with Research.
- 2013: she was awarded the Queen's Anniversary Award for Higher Education.
- 2014: Black was awarded a Royal Society Wolfson Research Merit Award for her research into identification from the hand.
- 2017: she was presented with an honorary degree of Doctor of Medicine by University of St Andrews for her contribution to science and humanity.
- 2018: her book All That Remains: A Life in Death won the Saltire Book of the Year award.
- 2019: Black received an honorary Doctorate of Science (DSc) from the University of Aberdeen at a ceremony in which her daughter graduated in law.
- 2023: she was elected a Fellow of the Royal Society (FRS).
- In 2024, Black was appointed as a Lady of the Order of the Thistle (LT) by King Charles III.
- In 2025, Black was awarded honorary doctorates by Glasgow Caledonian University and Strathclyde University.

Lady Black was on 1 June 2026 appointed Squadron Honorary Colonel 2 (City of Dundee and Highland) Signal Squadron, 32 Signal Regiment Army Reserve, and was commissioned in His Majesty’s Land Forces in the rank of Local Colonel for the duration of the appointment in an existing vacancy.

Black features in a larger-than-life portrait by Ken Currie titled Unknown Man, which hangs in the National Galleries of Scotland in Edinburgh.

== Publications ==
Black has authored and co-authored numerous works including:

- 1997 Essential Anatomy for Anesthesia (co-author)
- 2000 Developmental Juvenile Osteology (co-author)
- 2004 The Juvenile Skeleton (co-author)
- 2009 Juvenile Osteology: A Laboratory and Field Manual (co-author)
- 2009 "Forensic Anthropology" in Encyclopaedia of Forensic Sciences (co-author)
- 2010 Disaster Victim Identification: The Practitioner's Guide (co-author)
- 2010 "The Neonatal Ilium—Metaphyseal drivers and neurovascular passengers" in The Anatomical Record (co-author)
- 2010 "Applying Virtual ID" in Police Professional (co-author)
- 2011 Age Estimation in the Living: The Practitioners Guide (co-author)
- 2011 Disaster Victim Identification: Experience and Practice (author)
- 2011 Forensic Anthropology: 2000 to 2010 (co-author)
- 2014 "Syrian detainee report" (co-author)
- 2018 All That Remains: A Life in Death (author)
- 2020 Written in Bone—Hidden Stories in What We Leave Behind (author)
- 2026 An Expert Witness: Forensic Science on Trial (author)

Academic offices
Preceded by Maggie Snowling	President of St John's College, Oxford; 2022-present	Incumbent
