= Ken Currie =

Scottish artist

- Born: March 9, 1960 (age 66); North Shields, North Tyneside, England, UK
- Education: Glasgow School of Art
- Known for: Painting, Printmaking
- Notable work: Three Oncologists, Portrait of Peter Higgs, Chimera

Ken Currie (born March 9, 1960, in North Shields, North Tyneside, England) is a Scottish artist known for figurative painting and portraits. In his early career in the 1980s, he was associated with the New Glasgow Boys group of artists. Currie was elected to the Royal Scottish Academy in 2024.

His work often deals with themes of class, illness, and decay. Currie says he wants his work to "hover in that area between beauty and horror". His work is in many major collections including the Tate, Scottish National Gallery of Modern Art, Yale Center for British Art, and the New York Public Library.

== Education & Works ==
Currie was born in England to Scottish parents and grew up in Barrhead, near the city of Glasgow. He started studying at the Glasgow School of Art in 1978 and graduated in 1983. In the late 1980s he was gaining attention as part of the New Glasgow Boys, a group of young Scottish figurative painters, including among others the artists Peter Howson, Adrian Wiszniewski and Steven Campbell.

Throughout the 1980s, Currie's work depicted heroic workers and revolutionary union representatives as part of a bigger "socialist Clydeside". This is seen as a response to the policies of then Prime Minister Margaret Thatcher. Currie was involved with the Communist Party and describes his political views at the time as those of a "typical Scottish leftist".

In 1987 Currie finished an eight-piece series of large-scale paintings of the massacre of the Calton weavers of 1787, which was the violent suppression of a strike by the British Army, resulting in "Scotland's first working-class martyrs". The paintings, which were commissioned for the 200th anniversary of the massacre, are now hanging on the ceiling of the People's Palace in Glasgow.

Starting with the early 1990s, Currie began to be emotionally affected by the political and humanitarian crises in Eastern Europe, such as the Yugoslav Wars. He incorporated this in his art by depicting decaying and damaged bodies.

While many of his portraits are loosely based on his own face, Currie has completed portraits of notable people. His work Three Oncologists, completed in 2002, depicts three doctors working at the Ninewells Hospital in Dundee: Professor Robert J. C. Steele, Professor Sir Alfred Cuschieri and Professor Sir David P. Lane. Commissioned by the Scottish National Portrait Gallery, it is one of his most well-known paintings. In 2005 Currie was commissioned by the University of Edinburgh to paint a portrait of theoretical physicist Peter Higgs.

In 2011 Currie unveiled Immortality, a body of work consisting of paintings of the wealthy and famous. The title is an ironic nod at their inability to cheat death.

In 2019 he revealed Unknown Man, a large-scale portrait of forensic anthropologist Dame Sue Black. The portrait is on long-term loan to the Scottish National Portrait Gallery and is displayed publicly. The idea for the portrait came to fruition when Currie and Professor Black crossed paths during a BBC Radio 4 programme, The Anatomy Lesson, which featured discussion around the relationship between art and anatomy. Following on from this meeting, Currie was invited to Professor Black's workplace at the University of Dundee, where she gave him a tour of the dissection room. The artist was so moved by what he witnessed and encountered that he later asked Professor Black to sit for the portrait.

In 2023 Currie shared his studio journals with long-time collaborator and art historian Tom Normand. Normand compiled and edited the content of said journals, which resulted in Ken Currie: Paintings and Writings.

Currie was elected to the Royal Scottish Academy in 2024.

== Themes and Influences ==
Chimera, 2010

Currie's paintings show a profound interest in the body (physical and metaphorical) and deeply explores the theme of mortality, which he called a "terror" later in his life. In a 2021 interview with Tatler Asia, Currie says he wants his work "to hover in that [liminal zone] between beauty and horror".

A lot of Currie's work features subjects in front of inky, dark backgrounds. This stylistic element has developed while he was studying surgeons and experienced the darkness and spotlight of an operating theater. Currie himself says he wants to depict "something emerging out of darkness" and admits that it has a "theatrical element" to it.

In a 2013 interview, Currie named figurative painter Francis Bacon as his "idol". In the same interview he says he "worships" 17th century Spanish painter Diego Velázquez.

== Bibliography ==
Exhibition Catalogs

- Ken Currie: Animals [Catalogue of the exhibition held at Flowers 2008] London.
- Ken Currie: Immortality [Catalogue of the exhibition held at Flowers 2010] London.
- Ken Currie: Tragic Forms [Catalogue of the exhibition held at Flowers 2016] London.

Monographs

- J. Harrison and G. Topp, Ken Currie: The Fourth Triptych and Other Works Cleveland County Council, 1995.
- Ken Currie, Ken Currie: Painting & Sculpture, 1995–96, Panart Publishing Limited, 1996, ISBN 1901340007.
- Tom Normand, Ken Currie: Details of a Journey, Lund Humphries Publishers, 2002, ISBN 0853318360.
- Ken Currie, Ken Currie: Paintings and Writings, Luath Press, 2023 ISBN 9781804251270.
