= People's Palace, Glasgow =

Museum and glasshouse in Glasgow Green, Glasgow, Scotland

Coordinates: 55°51′4″N 4°14′14″W

People's Palace
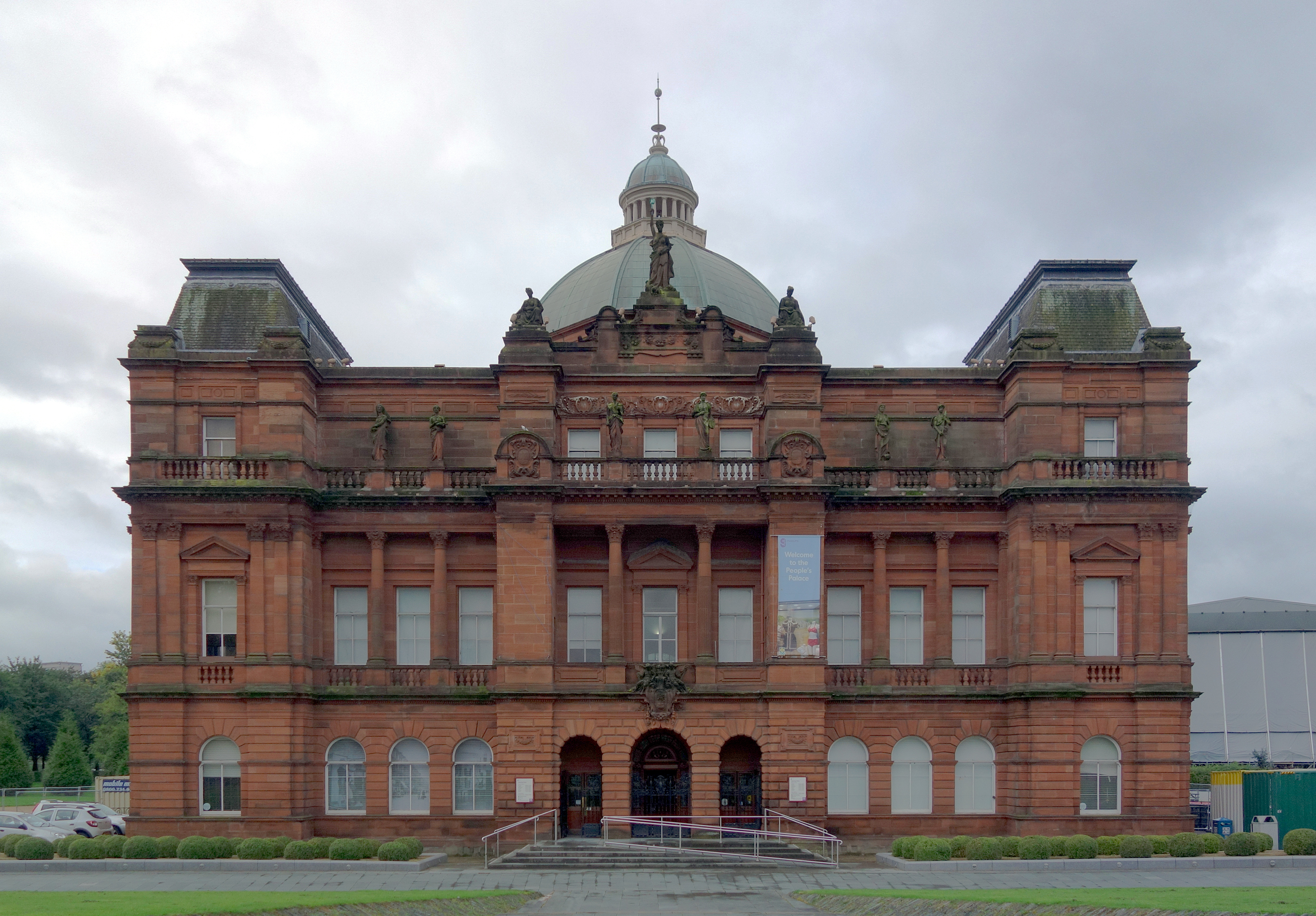
- Facade of the People's Palace
- Established: 1898
- Location: Glasgow Green, Glasgow, G40 1AT, Scotland
- Visitors: 223,774 (2019)
- Website: glasgowlife.org.uk

The People's Palace and Winter Gardens in Glasgow, Scotland, is a museum and glasshouse situated in Glasgow Green, and was opened on 22 January 1898 by The 5th Earl of Rosebery.

== Early history ==
Glasgow People's Palace took inspiration from its counterpart on Mile End Road in the East End of London, which was in turn inspired by William Besant's book All Sorts and Conditions of Men, published in 1882. The idea of "palaces for the people" also drew on the writings of John Ruskin, William Morris and Annie Besant.

At the time, the East End of Glasgow was one of the most unhealthy and overcrowded parts of the city, and the People's Palace was intended to provide a cultural centre for the people. It was designed by the City Engineer, Alexander B. McDonald, and decorated with sculptures representing Art, Science, Shipbuilding, Industry and Progress by William Kellock Brown. At the opening ceremony, Lord Rosebery described it as: "A palace of pleasure and imagination around which the people may place their affections and which may give them a home on which their memory may rest". He declared the building "Open to the people for ever and ever".

== Features ==
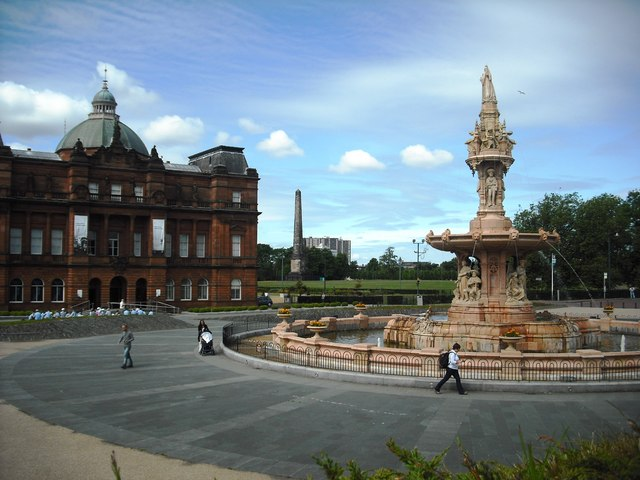
People's Palace on Glasgow Green

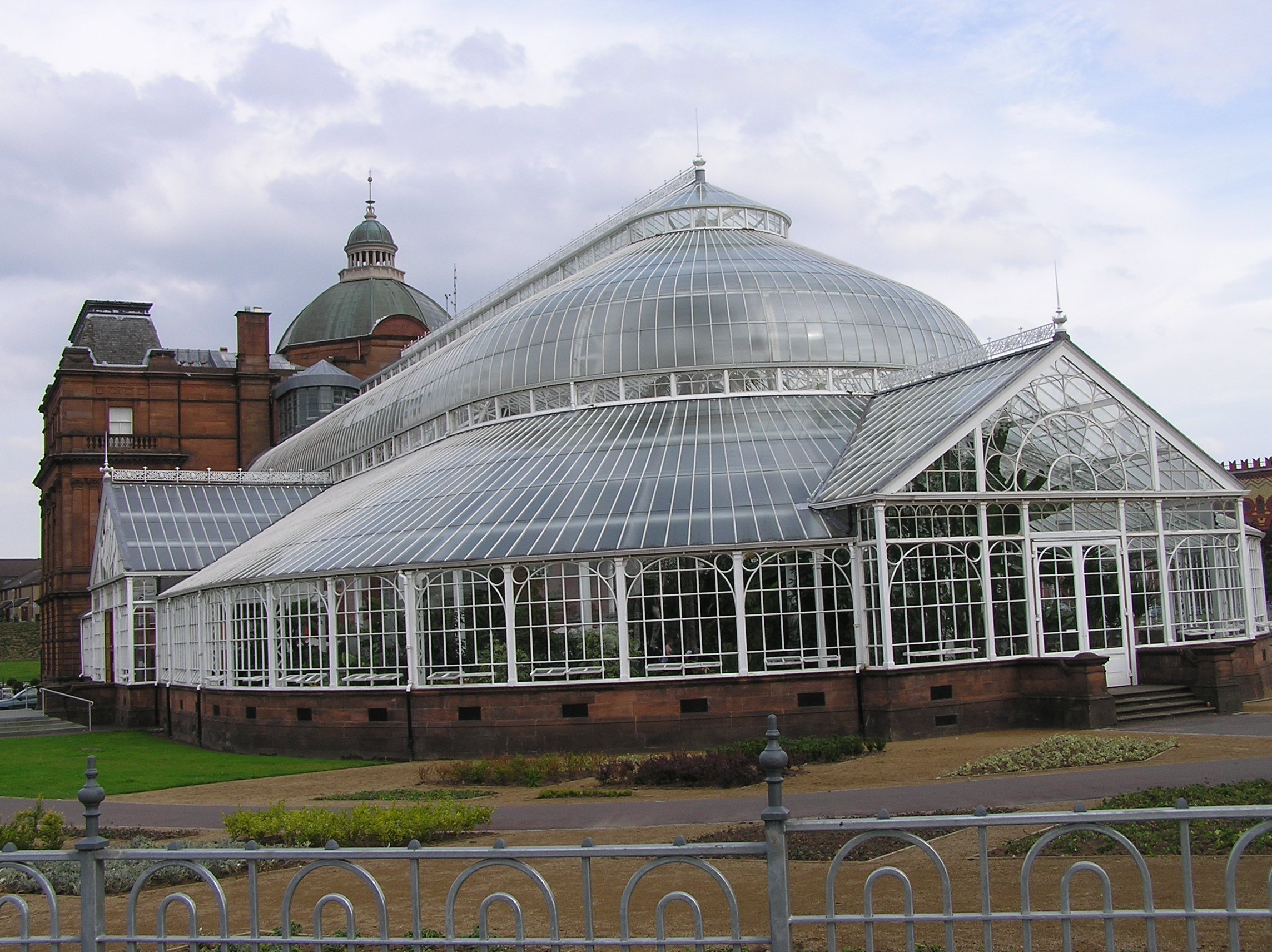
The Winter Gardens: conservatory at the rear of the People's Palace

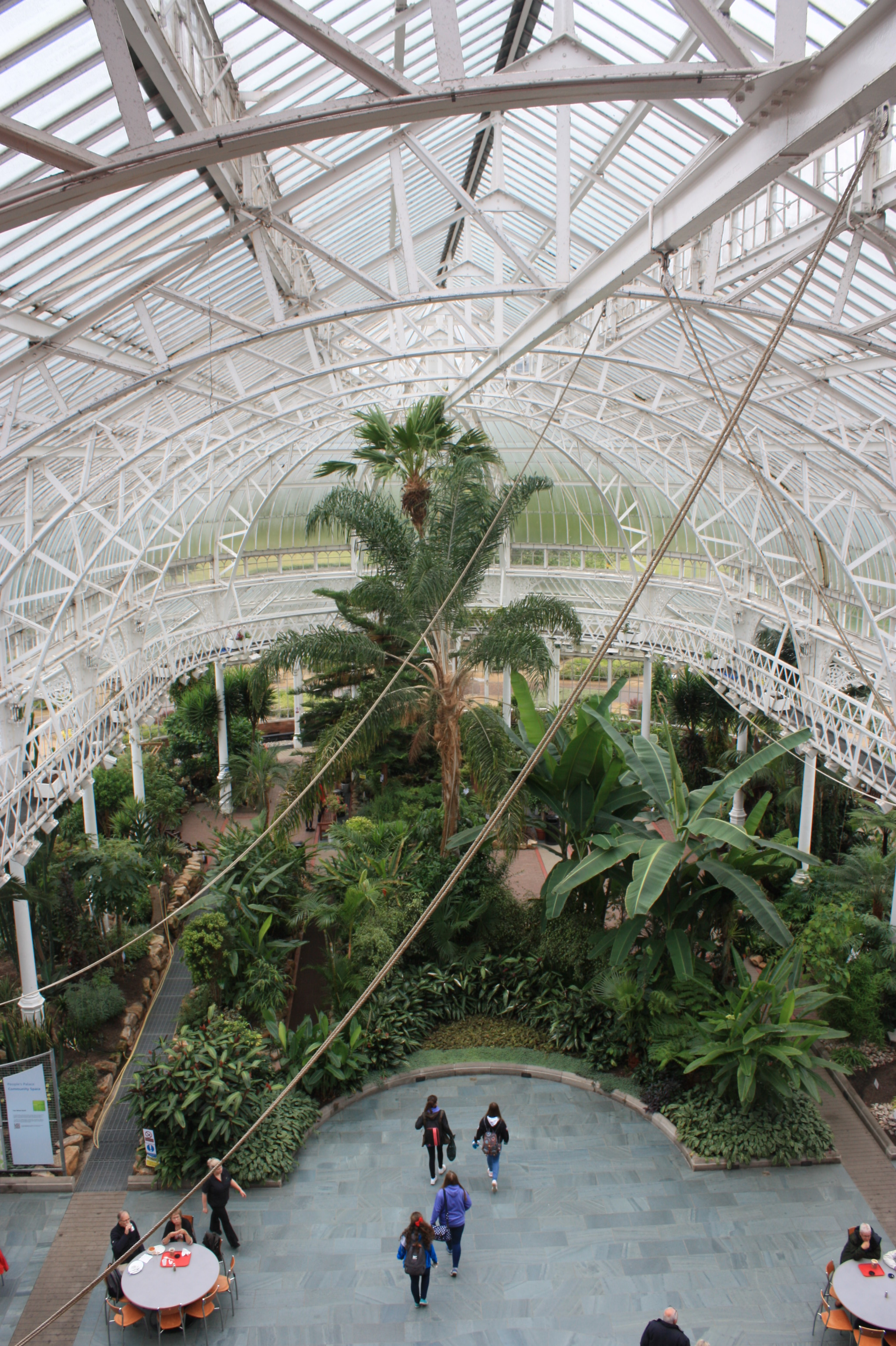
Interior, Winter Gardens

Originally, the ground floor of the building provided reading and recreation rooms, with a museum on the first floor, and a picture gallery on the top floor. Since the 1940s, it has been the museum of social history for the city of Glasgow, and tells the story of the people and the city from 1750 to the present day. The collections and displays reflect the changing face of the city and the different experiences of Glaswegians at home, work and leisure. Current displays (as of March 2009) include glimpses of typical Glasgow history such as life in a "single end" (a one-room tenement home), going to "the steamie" (the communal laundry), nights out at "the dancing" in the famous Barrowland Ballroom and trips "doon the watter" (down the Firth of Clyde) on steamers such as the Waverley. The palace is also home to renowned Scottish Socialist John MacLean's campaign desk, which can be found on the first floor.

== Closure ==
In the 1990s, the building was closed for almost two years to allow restoration work to be carried out, with the re-opening being timed to coincide with the 100-year anniversary of its first opening in 1898; this is recorded on a plaque mounted just inside the main entrance. Renovations extended to include the Winter Gardens to the rear of the building, where the glasshouse was extensively restored and reglazed, and the gardens tidied.

In January 2019 both the People's Palace and Winter Gardens closed again, with rare plants moved to alternative homes after the site was ruled structurally unsafe. However images of the derelict interior led to criticism of Glasgow City Council from Glasgow MP, Paul Sweeney who described it in The Times as an "appalling act of civic vandalism".

The People's Palace section reopened in June 2019 after a £350,000 refurbishment which saw the relocation of the fire exits away from the Winter Gardens. The venue then suffered an extensive closure during the pandemic from March 2020 before reopening two days a week from June 2021.

The Winter Gardens remained closed throughout as the sealant used to attach the glass to the glasshouse frame was considered to be at 'end of life' after its 1998 refurbishment. The SNP-led Glasgow City Council, and its culture and sports subsidiary Glasgow Life, which is chaired by the council's deputy leader, did not have sufficient funds to afford the renovations, estimated between £5–7.5M, with 81 of its 191 venues still remaining closed in November 2021.

Glasgow Life's troubles were exacerbated by lost revenue during the COVID-19 pandemic in Scotland led to concerns the venue, along with others, would never reopen, which in turn sparked protests. As of January 2022 there was no published plan or timetable for the Winter Gardens to reopen.

In January 2024, it was confirmed funding had been allocated by the National Lottery Heritage Fund, with an initial £850,000 received by the Glasgow Life charity that will expand to £7.5 million upon a second stage application to the Heritage Fund. Development to the building as a result of this funding was anticipated to take 16 months. STV News reported that the cost of the restoration project will amount to £35.9 million, which Glasgow City Council has already allocated £2.9 million towards and a further £11 million expected.

On 14 April 2024, the People's Palace closed for a final time for major refurbishment and restoration and is due to open in 2027 after three years. It will also feature the return of Winter Gardens, last seen in December 2018.

== Restoration ==
As part of the restoration the artist Ken Currie was commissioned to create a series of paintings for the ceiling dome of the museum. The eight panels mark the 200th anniversary of the Calton weavers Massacre of 1787 and depict the history of Glasgow's workers from that point to the present day.

In 2005 The Doulton Fountain was extensively refurbished and moved to its present position in front of the museum. At 46 feet high and 70 feet across at its base, it is the largest terracotta fountain in the world. It was gifted to the city in 1888 after the International Exhibition of Science, Art and Industry by Sir Henry Doulton to commemorate Queen Victoria’s Golden Jubilee, and is decorated with a figure of the Queen and groups from Canada, Australia, India and South Africa representing Britain's Empire.

== The People's Palace cat ==
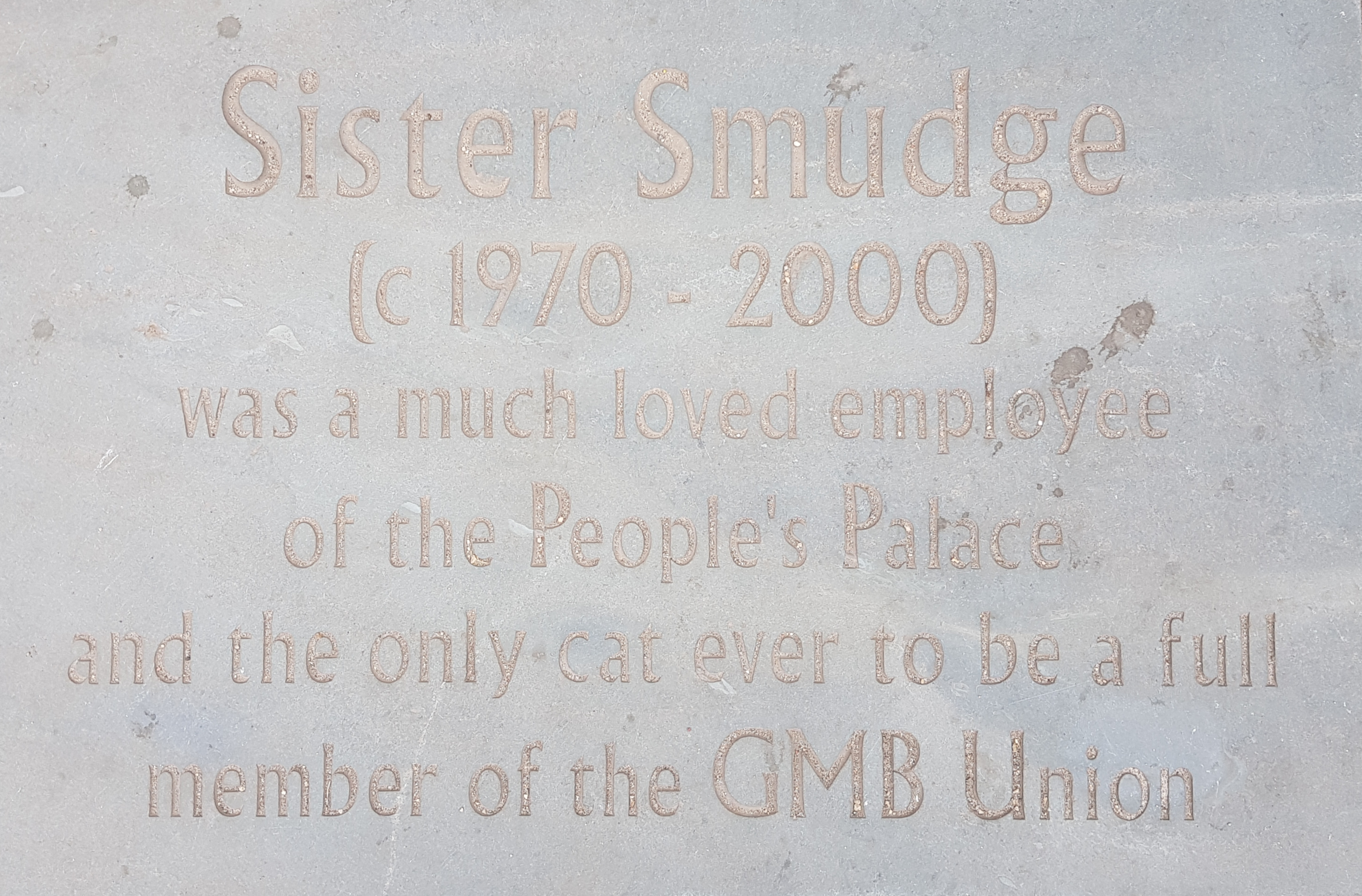
Plaque dedicated to Smudge outside the People's Palace

During the 1980s, a cat called Smudge gained local fame when she became a member of the General, Municipal, Boilermakers and Allied Trade Union, after NALGO refused her admission as a blue collar worker.
