= 1760 =

1760 in various calendars
- Gregorian calendar: 1760; MDCCLX
- Ab urbe condita: 2513
- Armenian calendar: 1209; ԹՎ ՌՄԹ
- Assyrian calendar: 6510
- Balinese saka calendar: 1681–1682
- Bengali calendar: 1166–1167
- Berber calendar: 2710
- British Regnal year: 33 Geo. 2 – 1 Geo. 3
- Buddhist calendar: 2304
- Burmese calendar: 1122
- Byzantine calendar: 7268–7269
- Chinese calendar: 己卯年 (Earth Rabbit); 4457 or 4250 — to — 庚辰年 (Metal Dragon); 4458 or 4251
- Coptic calendar: 1476–1477
- Discordian calendar: 2926
- Ethiopian calendar: 1752–1753
- Hebrew calendar: 5520–5521
- Hindu calendars
- Vikram Samvat: 1816–1817
- Shaka Samvat: 1681–1682
- Kali Yuga: 4860–4861
- Holocene calendar: 11760
- Igbo calendar: 760–761
- Iranian calendar: 1138–1139
- Islamic calendar: 1173–1174
- Japanese calendar: Hōreki 10 (宝暦１０年)
- Javanese calendar: 1685–1686
- Julian calendar: Gregorian minus 11 days
- Korean calendar: 4093
- Minguo calendar: 152 before ROC 民前152年
- Nanakshahi calendar: 292
- Thai solar calendar: 2302–2303
- Tibetan calendar: ས་མོ་ཡོས་ལོ་ (female Earth-Hare); 1886 or 1505 or 733 — to — ལྕགས་ཕོ་འབྲུག་ལོ་ (male Iron-Dragon); 1887 or 1506 or 734

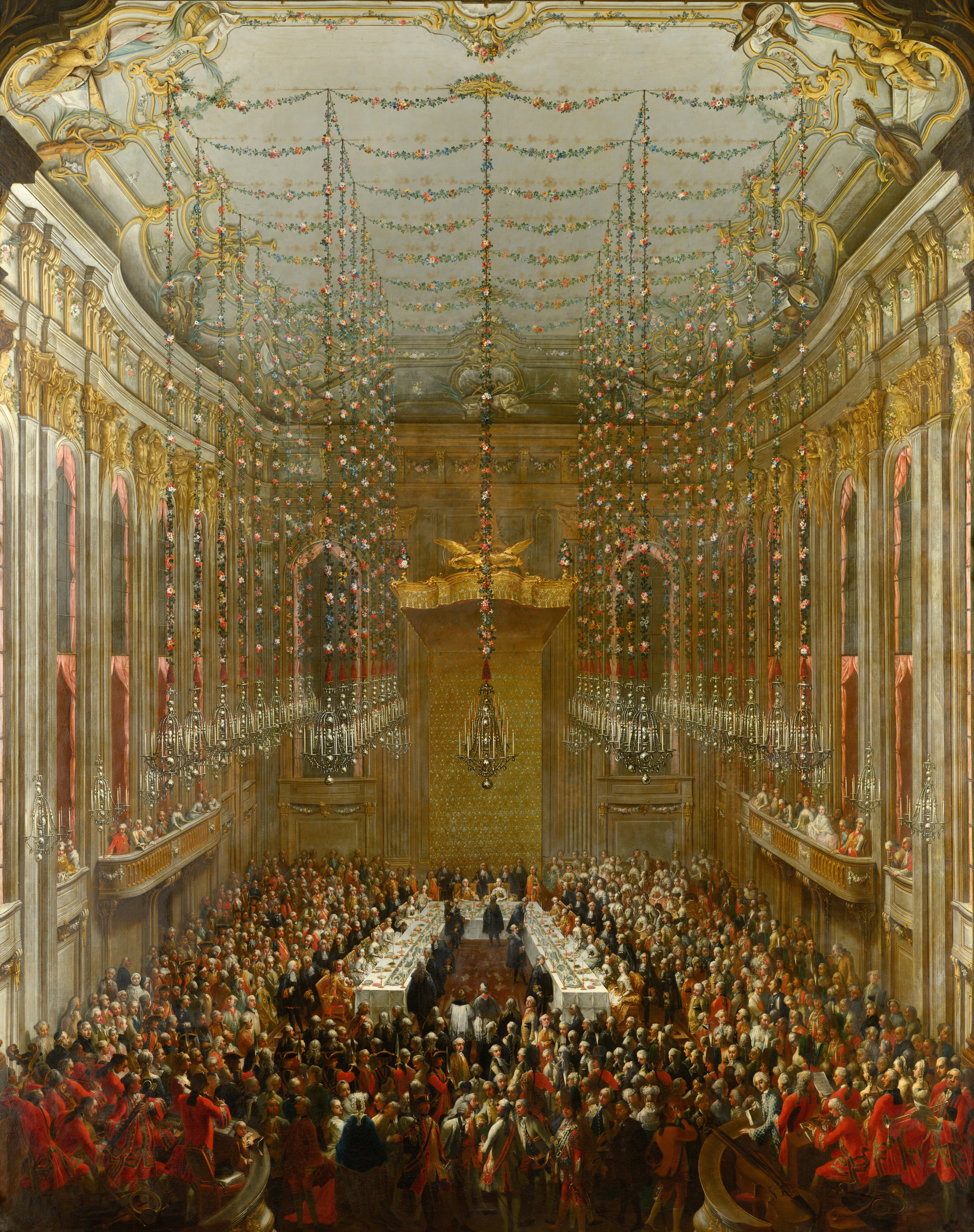
October 5: Princess Isabella of Parma marries Archduke Joseph of Austria to strengthen the Franco-Austrian Alliance.

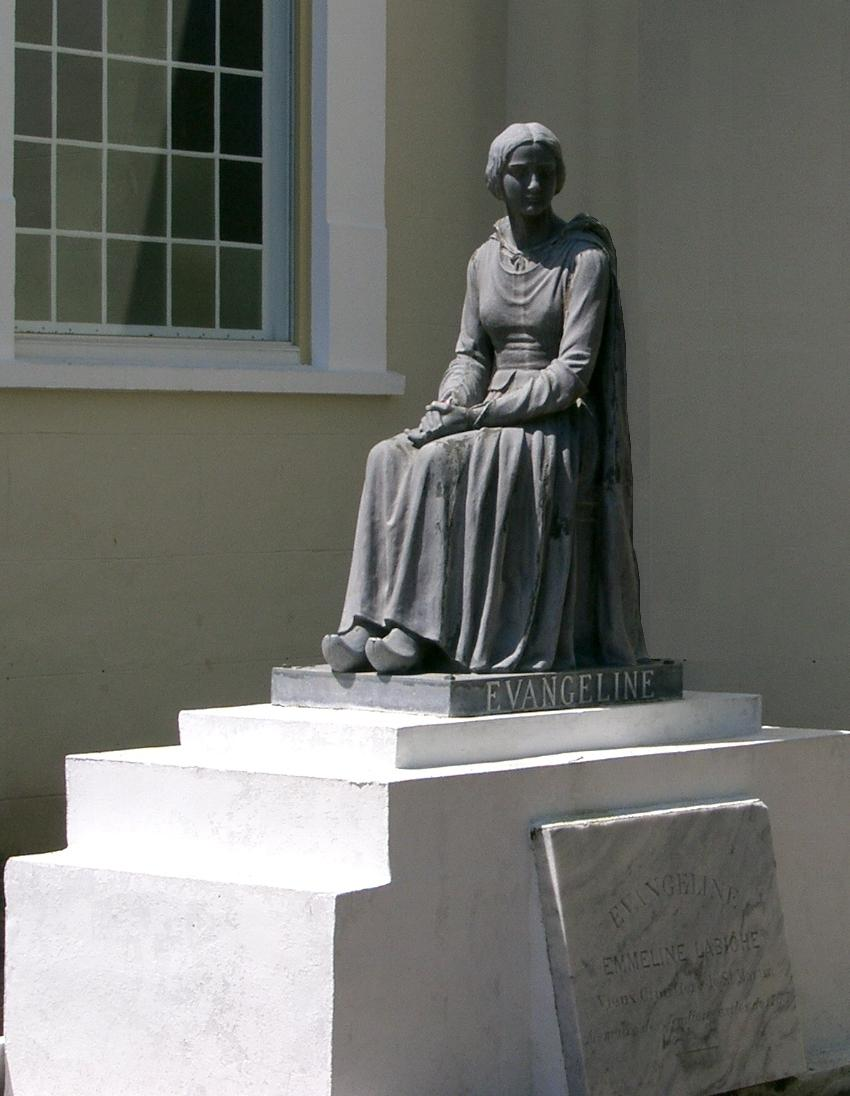
June 4: Evangeline statue commemorates the Expulsion of the Acadians.

1760 (MDCCLX) was a leap year starting on Tuesday of the Gregorian calendar and a leap year starting on Saturday of the Julian calendar, the 1760th year of the Common Era (CE) and Anno Domini (AD) designations, the 760th year of the 2nd millennium, the 60th year of the 18th century, and the 1st year of the 1760s decade. As of the start of 1760, the Gregorian calendar was 11 days ahead of the Julian calendar, which remained in localized use until 1923.

== Events ==
=== January–March ===
- January 9 – Battle of Barari Ghat: Afghan forces defeat the Marathas.
- January 22 – Seven Years' War – Battle of Wandiwash, India: British general Sir Eyre Coote is victorious over the French under the Marquis de Bussy-Castelnau.
- January 28 – Benning Wentworth creates the New Hampshire Grant of Pownal, Vermont.
- February 15 – The British Royal Navy ship HMS Royal Katherine runs aground off Bolt Head in England, with the loss of 699 lives.
- February 21–26 – Seven Years' War: Battle of Carrickfergus in the north of Ireland – A force of French troops, under the command of privateer François Thurot, captures and holds the town and castle of Carrickfergus before retiring; the force is defeated (and Thurot killed) in the naval Battle of Bishops Court in the Irish Sea on February 28.
- February 27 – Seven Years' War: French and Indian War & Anglo-Cherokee War – Cherokee natives attack a North Carolina militia stationed at Fort Dobbs, in the western part of the province. The attack is repelled by the militia, under the command of General Hugh Waddell.
- March 20 – The Great Fire of Boston, Massachusetts, destroys 349 buildings and marks the biggest conflagration in the American colonies up to this time.

=== April–June ===
- April 3 – Great Britain and Prussia agree to begin peace negotiations to end the Seven Years' War.
- April 7 – 'Tacky's War', a slave rebellion, begins in Jamaica and lasts for 18 months. During the uprising, 60 white residents are killed and more than 400 black rebels die in the suppression of the revolt. Another 500 are deported to British Honduras.
- April 10 – France's Minister of the Navy Nicolas René Berryer finally receives permission to send ships to assist French forces at Quebec, and a fleet of six ships under the command of Captain François Chenard de la Giraudais of the French frigate Machault departs Bordeaux, albeit too late to prevent the loss of New France to the British.
- April 11 – The Burmese Army, under the command of King Alaungpaya, reaches the outskirts of Siam's capital, Ayutthaya, but then retreats rather than laying siege to the city.
- April 12 – Two of six French ships run into a British blockade led by Britain's Admiral Edward Boscawen. Of the remaining four, one sinks before it can reach North America.
- April 20 – France's Marshal François Gaston de Lévis departs from Montreal up the St. Lawrence River with 7,000 troops on a plan to retake Quebec City from the British.
- April 22 – Belgian entertainer Joseph Mervin is said to have given the first demonstration of roller skates, in a performance at the Carlisle House in London, but the stunt ends in disaster.
- April 26 – Marshal Lévis and his troops land at Saint-Augustin-de-Desmaures, adjacent to Quebec City, and prepares to lay siege to the British occupying force.
- April 27 – British Army Brigadier General James Murray marches a force of 3,500 men toward Saint-Augustin to confront Marshal Lévis and the French Army.
- April 28 – British defenders and the French Army clash at the Battle of Sainte-Foy to determine the future control of Quebec. General Murray is forced to retreat after the British suffer 259 deaths and 845 wounded, while the French under Marshal Lévis suffer 193 deaths and 640 wounded.
- April 29 – Representatives of the remaining Penobscot Indian tribes in Maine and New Brunswick make peace with the British at Fort Pownal in Newfoundland.
- April 30 – Swiss mathematician Daniel Bernoulli presents a paper at the French Academy of Sciences in Paris in which "a mathematical model was used for the first time to study the population dynamics of infectious disease."
- May 11 – King Alaungpaya of Burma dies during a retreat from Ayutthaya after stopping at the village of Kinywa while en route to Martaban. His son Naungdawgyi becomes the new King of Burma.
- May 16 – Three British Royal Navy ships under the command of Commodore Robert Swanton on HMS Vanguard arrive to break the siege of Quebec before Marshal Lévis can recapture the city from the British.
- May 17 – Captain Giraudais's French fleet reaches the Gaspé Peninsula of northeast Quebec and captures seven British merchant ships, but Giraudais learns that the British have already preceded him up the St. Lawrence River and diverts to Chaleur Bay at Newfoundland.
- June 4 – Expulsion of the Acadians: New England planters arrive to claim land in Nova Scotia taken from the Acadians.
- June 11 – Robert Rogers and his Rangers launch a strike from Lake Champlain against French military posts along the Richelieu River – they strike at Fort Sainte Thérèse and destroy the settlement.
- June 19 – The British create Cumberland County and Lincoln County in Maine.
- June 22 – Britain's Captain John Byron, commanding HMS Fame, locates France's Captain Giraudais but runs aground on June 25 before it can attack.

=== July–September ===
- July 3 – A lightning strike causes a major fire at Portsmouth Royal Dockyard in England.
- July 8 – Seven Years' War: French and Indian War – Battle of Restigouche: The British defeat French forces, in the last naval battle in New France.
- July 19 – A formal request is made to the Spanish government, to allow the founding of the later city of Mayagüez, Puerto Rico.
- July 31 – Seven Years' War: Battle of Warburg – The Anglo-Hanoverian army of Ferdinand of Brunswick storms Warburg, with a heroic role being played by the English commander Lord Granby.
- August 21 – The church (later cathedral) of Our Lady of Candlemas of Mayagüez (Puerto Rico) is founded, establishing the basis for the founding of the city in the following month.
- August 30 – Seven Years' War: Battle of Legnica – By a series of brilliant maneuvers, Frederick the Great manages to defeat the Austrian army of Marshal Laudon before it can unite with that of Marshal Daun.
- September 8 – Seven Years' War: Jeffery Amherst and his British troops capture Montreal from the French, effectively bringing Canada completely under British control.
- September 18 – The town (later city) of Mayagüez, Puerto Rico, is founded.

=== October–December ===
- October 5 – The wedding of Princess Isabella of Parma and Prince Joseph of Austria takes place at Hofburg Palace's Redoute Hall (Redoutensaele), at the former imperial palace in Vienna.
- October 9 – Seven Years' War: Russian troops enter Berlin.
- October 16 – Seven Years' War: Battle of Kloster-Kamp – Ferdinand of Brunswick is beaten back from the Rhine by a French army.
- October 25 – King George II of Great Britain and Ireland dies; his 22-year-old grandson George, Prince of Wales, succeeds to the throne as George III and reigns for 59 years until his death on January 29, 1820.
- November 3 – Seven Years' War: Battle of Torgau – In another extremely hard battle, Frederick defeats Daun's Austrians, who withdraw across the Elbe.
- November 29 – French Army Colonel François-Marie Picoté de Belestre formally surrenders Detroit to British Army Major Robert Rogers, and the British Union Jack is raised over Fort Detroit.
- December 4 – For the first time since the surrender of Fort Detroit by France, British authorities meet nearby at a Native American council house with delegates from various Indian tribes that had fought as allies of the French Army, such as the Wyandot and Ottawa Indians, and with tribes that had formerly been allies of the British. The European and Native American representatives open the peace conference with the presentation by the Indians to the British of a wampum belt, and the pronouncement from the principal chief that "The ancient friendship is now renewed, and I wash the blood off the earth that had been shed during the present war, that you may bury the war hatchet in the bottomless pit."
- December 6 – The siege of Pondicherry, a stronghold of France in India, is begun by British Army Lieutenant General Eyre Coote. The French commander, General Thomas Lally, is finally forced to surrender Pondicherry to the British on January 15, 1761.
- December 18 – In the wake of Tacky's War by African-born rebels, the Assembly of the British colony of Jamaica outlaws the African religious practice of obeah, with penalties ranging from banishment from the colony to execution. The legislation specifically bans use of contraband associated with obeah, including "animal blood, feathers, parrots' beaks, dogs' teeth, alligators' teeth, broken bottles, grave dirt, rum, and eggshells".

=== Date unknown ===
- Abbé Charles-Michel de l'Épée opens a school for deaf education in Paris which becomes the Institut National de Jeunes Sourds de Paris, the world's first free school for the deaf; Thomas Braidwood establishes Braidwood's Academy for the Deaf and Dumb in Edinburgh, the first school for the deaf in Britain.
- Western countries pay 3,000,000 ounces of silver for Chinese goods.
- approximate date – Abu Dhabi is founded.

== Births ==
- January 11 – Zofia Potocka, Greek slave courtesan, agent for Russia and Polish noble (d. 1822)
- March 1 – François Nicolas Leonard Buzot, French Revolutionary leader (suicide 1794)
- March 5 – Marie-Adélaïde de La Touche-Limouzinière, French aristocrat, counter-revolutionary and combatant in the War of the Vendée (d. 1794)
- March 10 – Leandro Fernández de Moratín, Spanish dramatist, translator and neoclassical poet (d. 1828)
- March 28 – Thomas Clarkson, English abolitionist (d. 1846)
- April 16 – Sigismund Friedrich Hermbstädt, German pharmacist, chemist (d. 1833)
- April 30 – Joseph Souham, French general (d. 1837)
- May 10 – Johann Peter Hebel, German poet (d. 1826)
- May 28 – Alexandre, Vicomte de Beauharnais, French politician, general (d. 1794)
- May 29 – Charlotte Slottsberg, Swedish ballerina (d. 1800)
- June 12 – Jean-Baptiste Louvet de Couvrai, French novelist, playwright, journalist, politician and diplomat (d. 1797)
- June 16 – Louise Contat, French actress (d. 1813)
- July 13 – István Pauli (Pável), Hungarian Slovene priest, writer (d. 1829)
- August 3 – Jacques Réattu, French artist 9d. (1833)
- August 22 – Pope Leo XII, (b. Annibale Francesco Clemente Melchiore Girolamo Nicola Sermattei della Genga), Italian priest (d. 1829)
- September 14 – Luigi Cherubini, Italian composer (d. 1842)
- September 21 – Olof Swartz, Swedish botanist (d. 1818)
- September 30 – Michele Cachia, Maltese architect and military engineer (d. 1839)
- October 7 (bapt.) – Fredrica Löf, Swedish actress (d. 1813)
- October 17 – Claude Henri de Rouvroy, comte de Saint-Simon, French economist, political theorist (d. 1825)
- October 27 – August von Gneisenau, Prussian field marshal (d. 1831)
- October 31? – Hokusai, born Katsushika Tokitarō, Japanese Edo period artist, ukiyo-e painter and printmaker (died 1849)

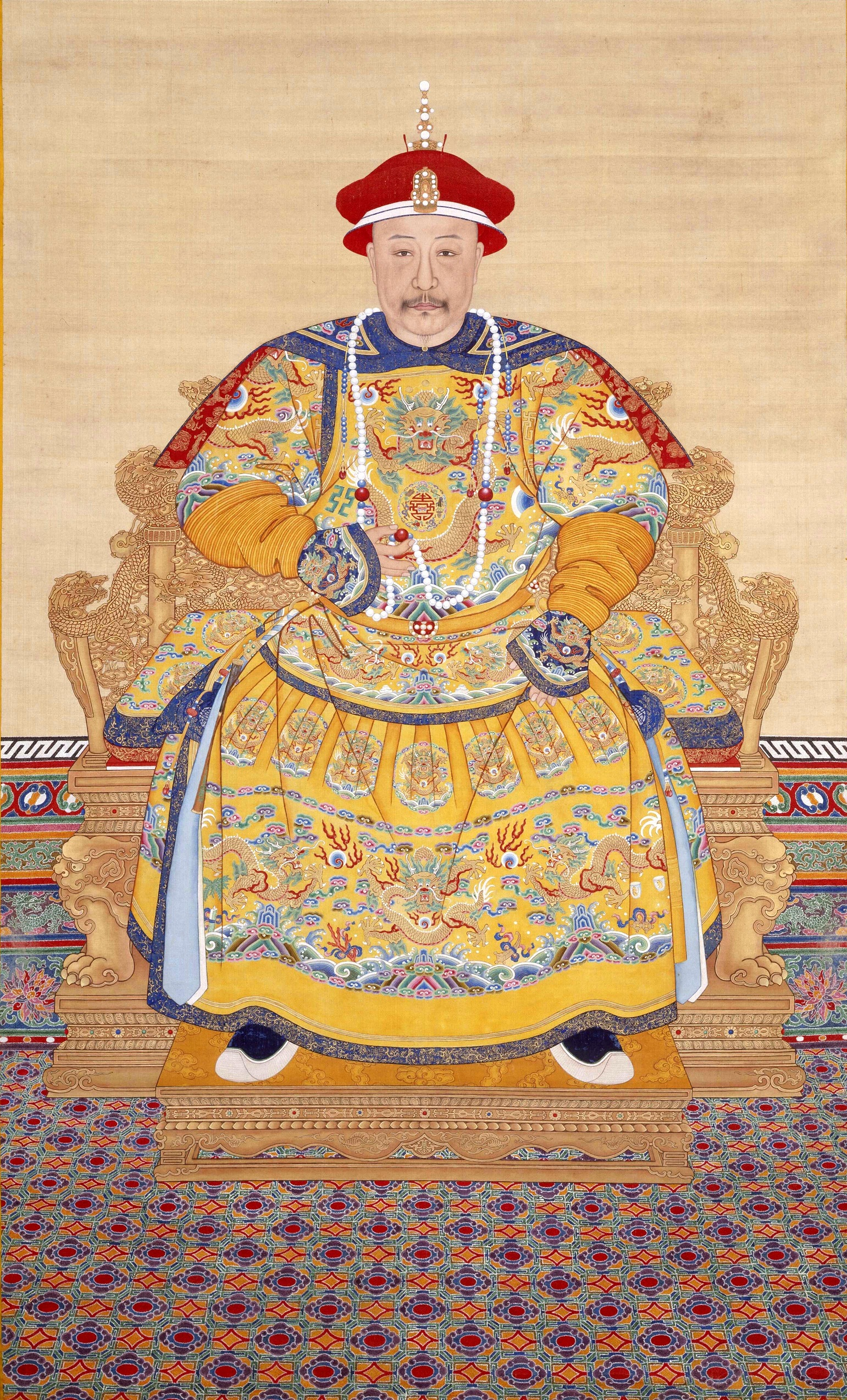
Jiaqing Emperor

- November 13 – Jiaqing Emperor of China (d. 1820)
- November 21 – Joseph Plumb Martin, American Revolutionary soldier and narrative author (d. 1850)
- November 24 – Fabian Wrede, Swedish field marshal (d. 1824)
- November 28 – Maria Teresa Poniatowska, Polish noblewoman (d. 1834)
- December 17 – Deborah Sampson, first American female soldier (d. 1827)
- date unknown
  - Adam Gillies, Lord Gillies, Scottish judge (d. 1842)
  - Emma Jane Greenland, English painter, writer, singer (d. 1843)
  - Clelia Durazzo Grimaldi, Italian botanist (d. 1830)
  - Moscho Tzavela, Greek-Souliote heroine (d. 1803)
- probable date – Lemuel Francis Abbott, English portrait painter (d. 1802)

== Deaths ==
- February 22 – Anna Magdalena Bach, accomplished German singer, second wife of Johann Sebastian Bach (b. 1701)
- April 3 – John Rous, Royal Navy officer during King George's War and the Seven Years' War (b. 1702)
- April 6 – Charlotte Charke, British actor and writer (b. 1713)
- April 10 – Jean Lebeuf, French historian (b. 1687)
- April 11 – Prince Moritz of Anhalt-Dessau, German general (b. 1712)
- April 18 – Mary Alexander, influential colonial-era merchant in New York City (b. 1693)
- May 5 – Laurence Shirley, 4th Earl Ferrers, English murderer (hanged) (b. 1720)
- May 9 – Nicolaus Ludwig Zinzendorf, German religious and social reformer (b. 1700)
- May 10 – Christoph Graupner, German composer (b. 1683)
- May 15 – King Alaungpaya of Burma (b. 1711)
- May 22 – Israel ben Eliezer aka Baal Shem Tov, Polish-born mystical rabbi, founder of Hasidic Judaism (b. 1698)
- May 30 – Joanna Elisabeth of Holstein-Gottorp, German duchess (b. 1712)
- June 13 – Antoine Court, French Huguenot minister (b. 1696)
- July 13 – Conrad Weiser, Pennsylvania's ambassador to the Iroquois Confederacy (b. 1696)
- August 27 – Smart Lethieullier, English antiquary (b. 1701)
- September 11 – Louis Godin, French astronomer (b. 1704)
- September 17 – George Bowes, English coal proprietor, Member of Parliament (b. 1701)
- October 15 – Nicolas d'Assas, captain of the French regiment of Auvergne (b. 1733)

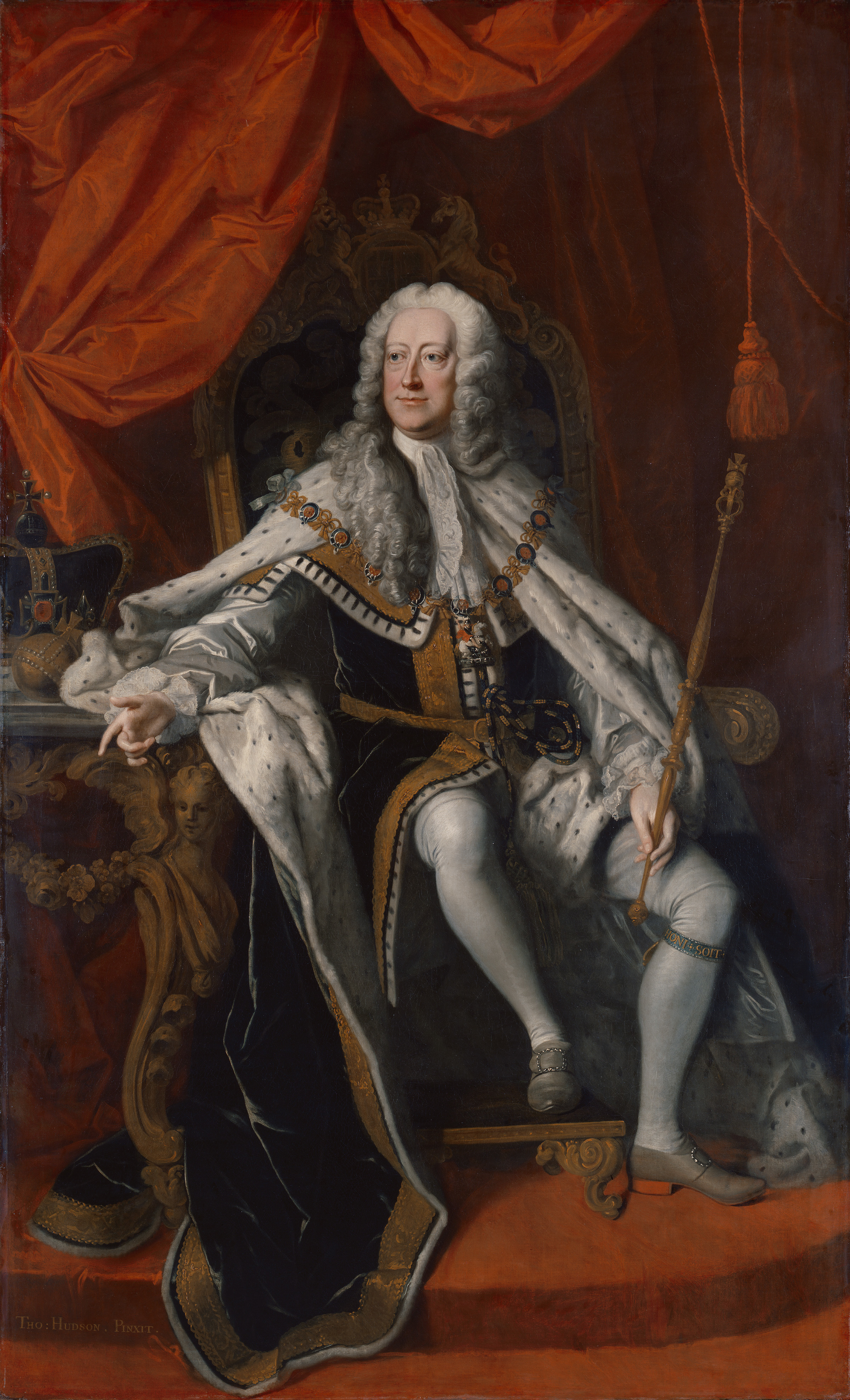
George II of Great Britain

- October 25 – King George II of Great Britain (b. 1683)
- November 30 – Friederike Caroline Neuber, German actress (b. 1697)
