= HMS Sapphire =

Eight ships of the Royal Navy have borne the name HMS Sapphire, after the Sapphire, a precious gemstone:

- English ship Sapphire (1651) was a 34-gun ship launched in 1651 and run ashore to avoid capture in 1671.
- HMS Sapphire (1675) was a 32-gun fifth-rate frigate launched in 1675 and scuttled by her captain (Capt. Thomas Cleasby) to prevent capture by the French in 1696.
- HMS Sapphire (1708) was a 42-gun fourth rate launched in 1708, hulked in 1740 and sold in 1745.
- HMS Sapphire (1741) was a 44-gun fifth rate launched in 1741. She was reduced to 32 guns in 1756 to 1758 and relaunched as:
- HMS Sapphire (1758) was a 32-gun frigate built by Adam Hayes at Deptford
- HMS Sapphire (1806) was an 18-gun sloop launched in 1806 and sold in 1822.
- HMS Sapphire (1827) was a 28-gun sixth rate launched in 1827 and sold in 1864.
- HMS Sapphire (1874) was an Amethyst-class wooden screw corvette launched in 1874 and sold in 1892.
- HMS Sapphire (1904) was a Topaze-class third-class protected cruiser launched in 1904 and sold for scrap in 1921.
- HMT Sapphire (1935) was an ASW trawler (P.No.T.27) sold on 9 April 1946 and scrapped at Stavanger, Norway in June 1970.

== See also ==
- HMS Sapphire II was a temporary name for the armoured cruiser HMS Imperieuse while she was a destroyer depot ship between 1905 and 1909.
- HMS Sapphire's Prize was a 10-gun sloop captured in 1745 by HMS Sapphire, and wrecked several months later.
