= John Carter Allen =

Admiral John Carter Allen (19 January 1724 – 2 October 1800) was a Royal Navy officer.

== Life and career ==
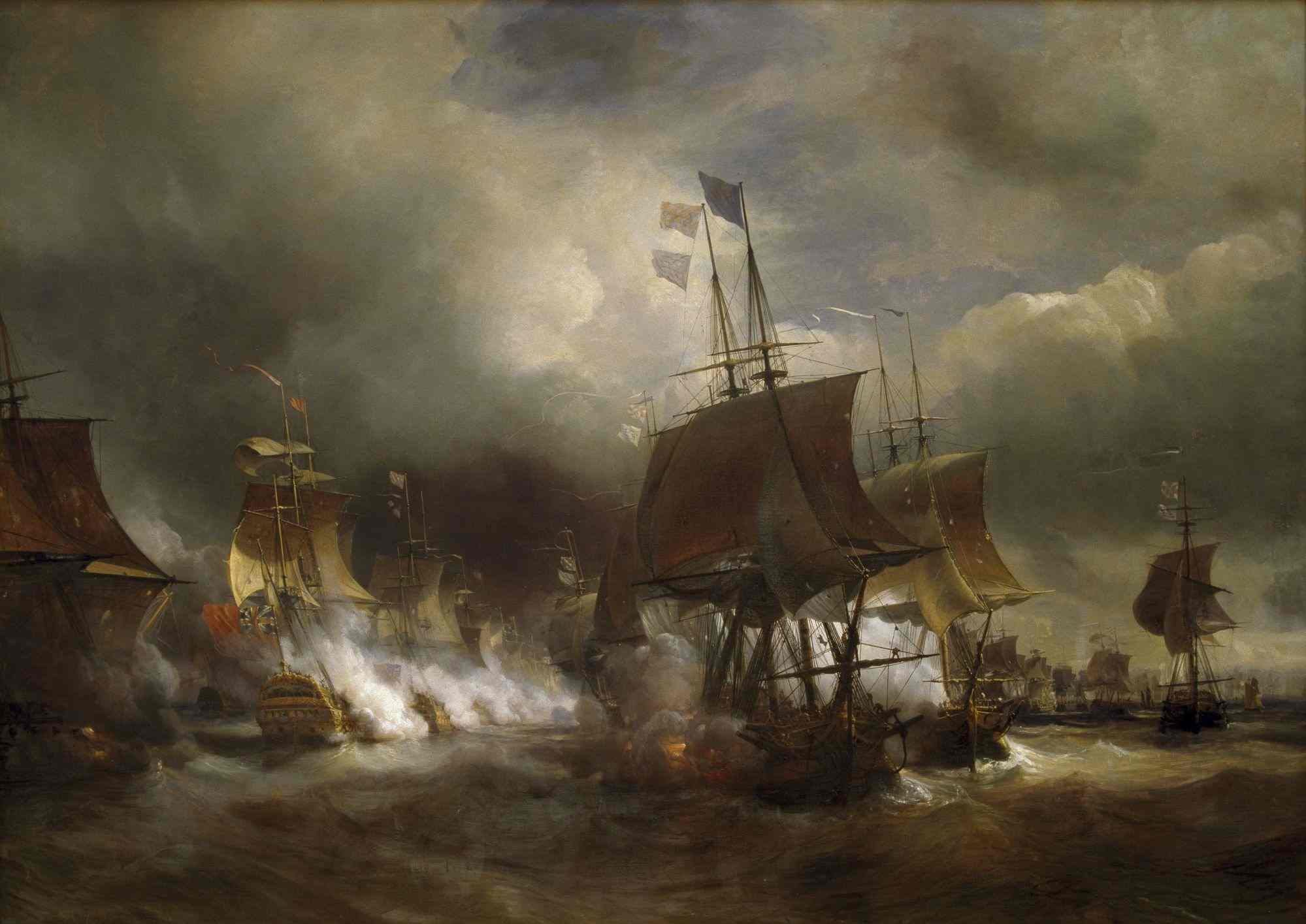
The Battle of Ushant

The Battle of Cape Spartel

He was born in London on 19 January 1724 the son of Carter Allen and his wife Emma Hay. He was baptised at St Dunstan in the East. He was educated at Westminster College where he befriended Augustus Keppel.

On 14 June 1745 he appears as a commissioned lieutenant in the Royal Navy lists. He served on HMS Gosport under Captain Thomas Pye which served in Nova Scotia returning to England in 1752. He also served on HMS Swan 1750/51.

On 5 April 1757 he got his first command: the 14-gun sloop HMS Grampus which under his command in May 1757 took the French privateers La Philippine and Le Duc D'Aumont on consecutive days in the Bay of Biscay.

On 21 March 1758 he was promoted to Captain and transferred to command of the infamous HMS Experiment which in December 1758 was involved in the capture of Goree alongside his friend Commodore Keppel, at which Experiment was damaged and paid off. In 1758/9 he temporarily replace Captain John Strachan on HMS Sapphire, capturing the French privateer "Le Saint Michel" on 1 February 1759. Due to his success on Experiment, in August 1759 he was given command of the newly captured 32-gun French frigate HMS Repulse in which he was part of force sent to destroy the Fortress of Louisbourg alongside Captain John Byron. He was then part of the British action at Chaleur Bay aka the Battle of Restigouche involving 4 British ships and 3 French ships.

In July 1761 he escorted a convoy to the West Indies under the flag of Admiral James Douglas and joined his squadron in the capture of Dominica on 8 June. He then attached to the squadron of Admiral George Brydges Rodney and in January 1762 was part of the fleet which captured Martinique.

He was briefly in command of HMS Rochester before in January 1763 taking command of the huge HMS Vanguard (70-gun and a crew ow 520 men) off Grenada.

He took extended shore leave 1764 to 1769 then took command of the 74 gun ship of the line HMS Superb in November, based in Portsmouth. In May 1770 he took command of HMS Ajax a newly launched ship of the line with 74 guns and 500 crew, based in Cork harbour. In June 1771 he moved to HMS Albion and April 1778 to HMS Egmont in which he was part of the Battle of Ushant.

In March 1780 he took command of the newly captured Spanish ship of the line HMS Gibraltar, but only as a nominal command during her refit to British standards at Plymouth Dockyard. In January 1781 he took HMS Formidable for a brief period, but his last active command was on HMS Royal William which had 84 guns and a crew of 750. On 29 August 1782 he was one of the presiding officers in the inquiry into the loss of HMS Royal George upon which 900 persons had died including Captain Richard Kempenfelt.

On Royal William on 20 October 1782 he took an active part in the Battle of Cape Spartel. He was promoted to Rear Admiral of the White in September 1787 and passed command of Royal William to Captain George Gayton in 1790.

In 1795 he was promoted to full Admiral. He retired in February 1799 and died on 2 October 1800.

== Family ==
In 1780 he married Caroline Addington (1731-1896, nee Arnold). In 1799 he married Stella Frances Freeman (1730-1821), daughter of Cope Freeman.

By Caroline he was father to:

- Lt Thomas Allen RN (1767-1852) who married Catherine Manning in 1792
- Jean or Jane Allen (1768-1829) who married Thomas Robinson in 1788
- Captain John Allen RN (1774-1854) who married Jane Skinner in 1811

His sister Emma Allen was married to Admiral Robert Swanton in 1750.

It is claimed (and dates would appear to support the theory) that all his children were born out of wedlock but he eventually married their mother in 1780. His grandchildren by Thomas were John Carter Allen (1795–1872) and Charles Manning Allen (1802–1880) who infamously changed their identity and claimed to be the Sobieski Stuarts.
