= Siege of Quebec (1760) =

Part of the Seven Years War

- Part of Seven Years' War
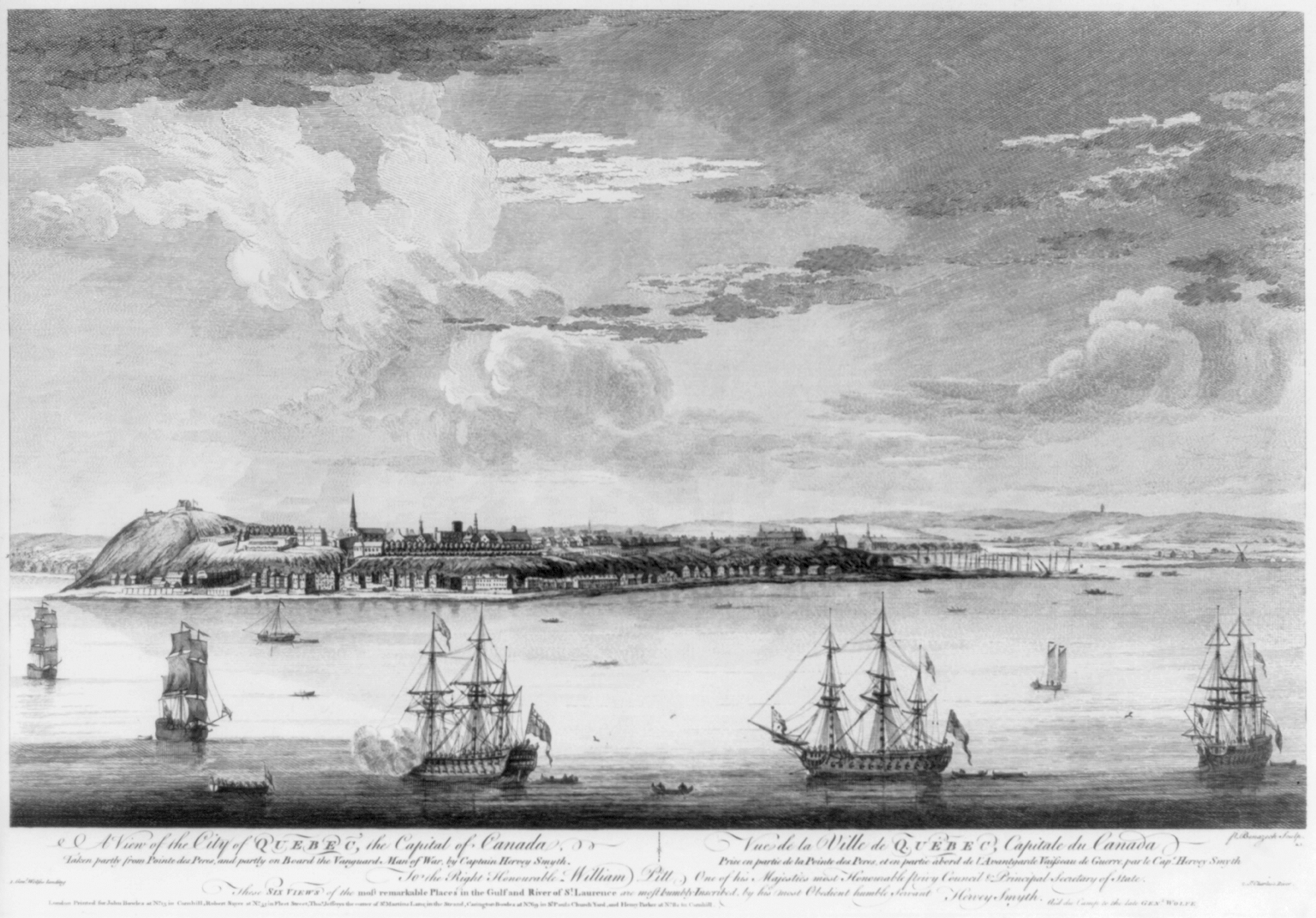
- A view of Quebec being relieved by the Royal Navy. Print by Captain Harvey Smith on board HMS Vanguard
Date	29 April – 17 May 1760 (2 weeks and 4 days)
Location	Quebec City, New France 46.8075°N 71.2075°W
Result	British victory

Belligerents
(Kingdom of Great Britain) Great Britain	(Kingdom of France) France: (New France) Colony of Canada

Commanders and leaders
(Kingdom of Great Britain) James Murray	(Kingdom of France) François Gaston de Lévis

Strength
~6,000; 150 guns 3 ships	3,500 regulars 3,500 militia and natives 132 guns 6 ships

Casualties and losses
30 killed or wounded Unknown to disease Naval action 1 Frigate wrecked	206–350 killed or wounded 300–400 captured 44 guns captured All stores captured Naval action 6 ships captured or destroyed

The siege of Quebec, also known as the second siege of Quebec, was a 1760 French attempt to retake Quebec City, in New France, which had been captured by Britain the previous year. The siege lasted from 29 April to 15 May, when British ships arrived to relieve the city and compelled the French commander, François Gaston de Lévis, to break off the siege and to retreat. The British launched the Montreal campaign a few months later, which resulted in the city's capture. French resistance ceased, and the British conquest of New France was complete, as was confirmed in 1763 by the Treaty of Paris.

== Background ==
In 1759, a British expedition, led by James Wolfe, had sailed up the St Lawrence River and laid siege to Quebec. After an initial failure at the Battle of Beauport, Wolfe managed to defeat the French field army under Louis-Joseph de Montcalm at the Battle of the Plains of Abraham on 13 September 1759. After Montcalm's death during the battle, the French armies outside Quebec retreated westwards despite their numerical supremacy and left the garrison of Quebec exposed to the British. The city surrendered several days later, and British forces under James Murray marched in and occupied it.

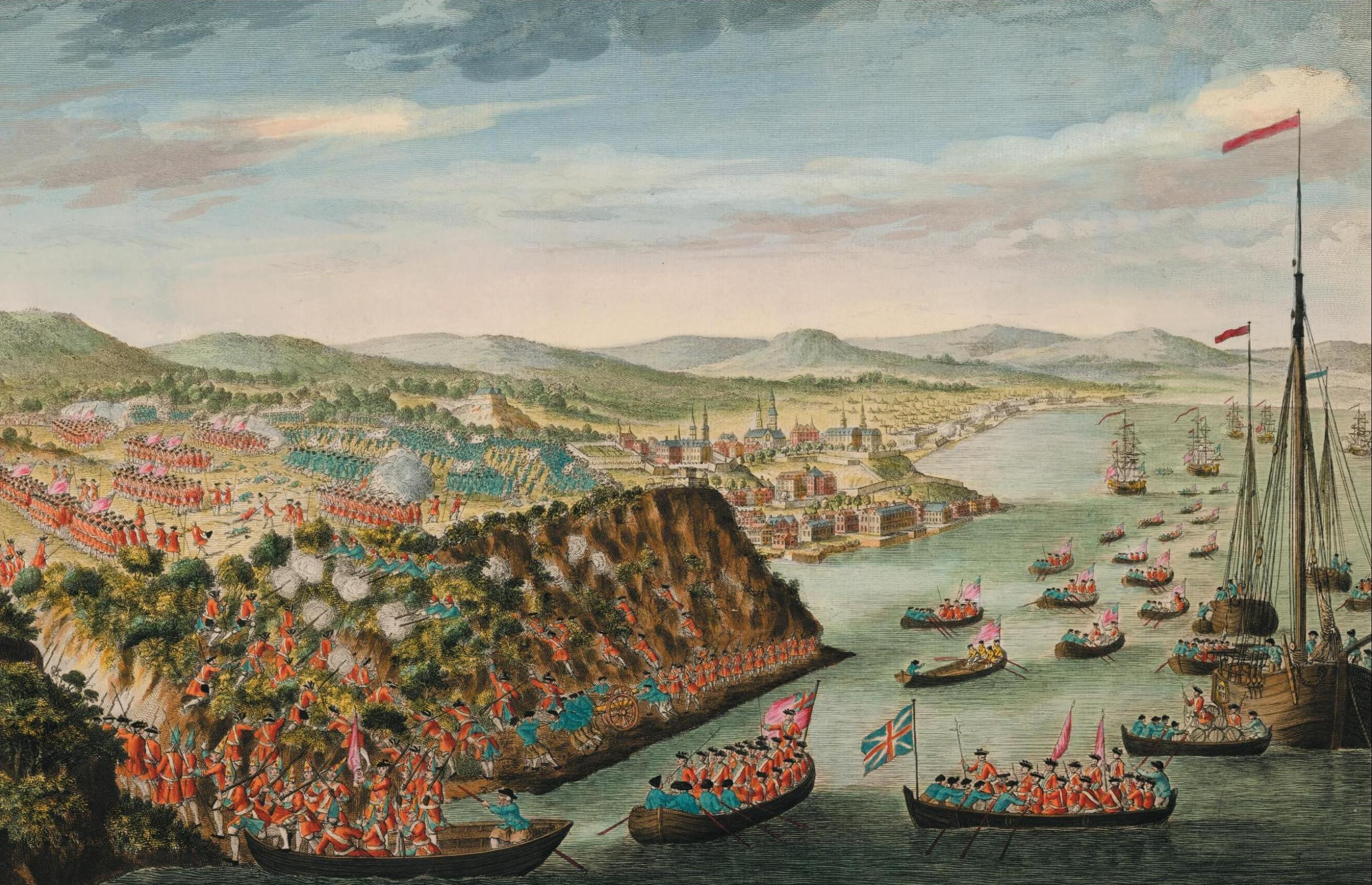
A view of the taking of Quebec, 13 September 1759

The retreating French troops had reached the Jacques-Cartier River, where they came under the command of François Gaston de Lévis on 17 September 1759. He initially hoped to lead his force back to recapture Quebec directly, but it became clear that such an immediate attack was impossible, and he decided to postpone any attempt until the following year. During the winter, Lévis's forces camped near the Jacques-Cartier River. In spite of his decision not to attack, rumours continued to circulate around Quebec throughout the winter that a major French assault was imminent. Lévis rejected a proposal by Murray for a winter truce. French patrols continued to operate and a position was even set up at Saint-Augustin close to Quebec until it was captured in a surprise attack by the British using snow shoes.

Lévis prepared his attack during the winter, and sent a message to Paris in October 1759 asking for reinforcements, siege artillery and supplies to be sent to Quebec as soon as possible. He was determined to press on as soon as the ice began to melt making the St Lawrence passable. On 20 April his force set out from Montreal, and reached the village of Sainte-Foy by 27 April. He had around 7,000 troops, around half were French regulars the remainder were Canadian militia and Native allies, and twelve artillery pieces. Some of the British expedition who had captured Quebec the previous autumn departed shortly afterwards with the fleet, leaving Murray with around 7,000 troops to defend the city. Because of a variety of ailments, shortages of food and weather a thousand of these troops had died, and two thousand more were ill, meaning Murray had only around 4,000 men in condition to fight.

Murray received warning of the French approach on the morning of 27 April costing Lévis the element of surprise he had hoped for. Murray's response to the appearance of Lévis and his force outside the city was to march out and take up a strong defensive position. He hoped Lévis would attack him, but it also allowed Murray time to withdraw his outposts of light infantry, some of them at Cap Rouge, who would otherwise have been cut off.

Lévis declined to attack Murray since he realised that the battlefield would not suit his plans. Instead, during the night, he chose to move his army to outflank Murray, using the woods on the British left as cover. Faced with the new threat, Murray, withdrew to a new position close to where the Battle of the Plains of Abraham had been fought the previous September. Instead of withdrawing back into the city, Murray elected to give battle. That was something of a gamble, which Murray justified by observing "that our little Army was in the habit of beating that Enemy" and because he feared the ability of his forces to withstand a siege. Murray had 3,800 troops in the field, virtually every soldier in Quebec fit to carry a musket, and Lévis had a similar number of men to hand although further forces were on their way.

=== Battle of Sainte-Foy ===
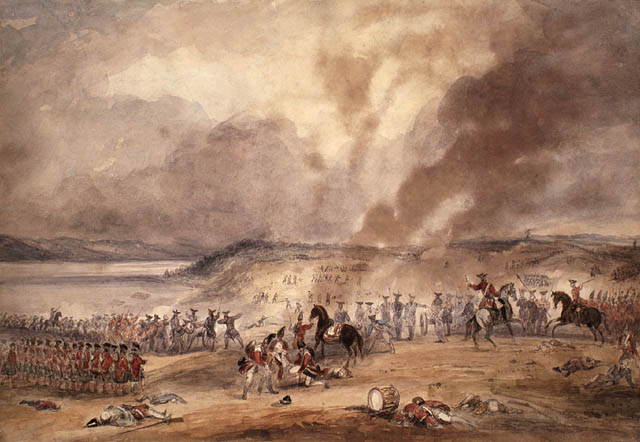
The Battle of Sainte-Foy took place outside Quebec, just before the siege, on 28 April 1760.

Lévis did not expect the British to give battle and was surprised to see them the following day. The battle began when Murray saw that the French main body was still on the march and had not yet formed up. Impulsively, abandoning the high ground, the British decided to attack. Their advance was slowed by the terrain, a mixture of half-melted snow and mud, and by the time the two sides engaged, the French were prepared. Initially, the British had success, driving the outlying French from their strong points and sending panic through the French ranks, which led some to flee into the nearby woods. The British pressed on and ran into the main body of French troops under Lévis.

After around an hour of close-quarters fighting, the British flanks began to give way, and Murray ordered a withdrawal. The French then completed their victory by capturing the abandoned British artillery. The battle was even bloodier than the one fought a year earlier: Lévis suffered 833 killed and wounded, while the British under Murray sustained 1,088 casualties—nearly a third of his force.

Seeing that there was no chance of salvaging the situation, Murray retreated with his remaining forces back into the city and prepared to hold out in the hope that relief would arrive up the Saint Lawrence for the defenders. Lévis had similar hopes, although he was realistic about the chances of any French relief, as he brought up the rest of his forces and began preparing to lay siege to the city. The captured British artillery was added to the French guns brought from Montreal.

== Siege ==
On 29 April, the day after the battle, the siege commenced, but Lévis had not originally intended to besiege Quebec, as he was waiting for reinforcements from France. As a result, he chose not to launch an immediate assault; his troops were too exhausted, and he was uncertain about the reliability of some of the militiamen. Instead, he occupied the hospital outside the city walls and began bringing up the artillery. However, Lévis refused to open fire with any cannon or mortars until he had forty guns in position, intending to unleash a devastating barrage.

=== British situation ===
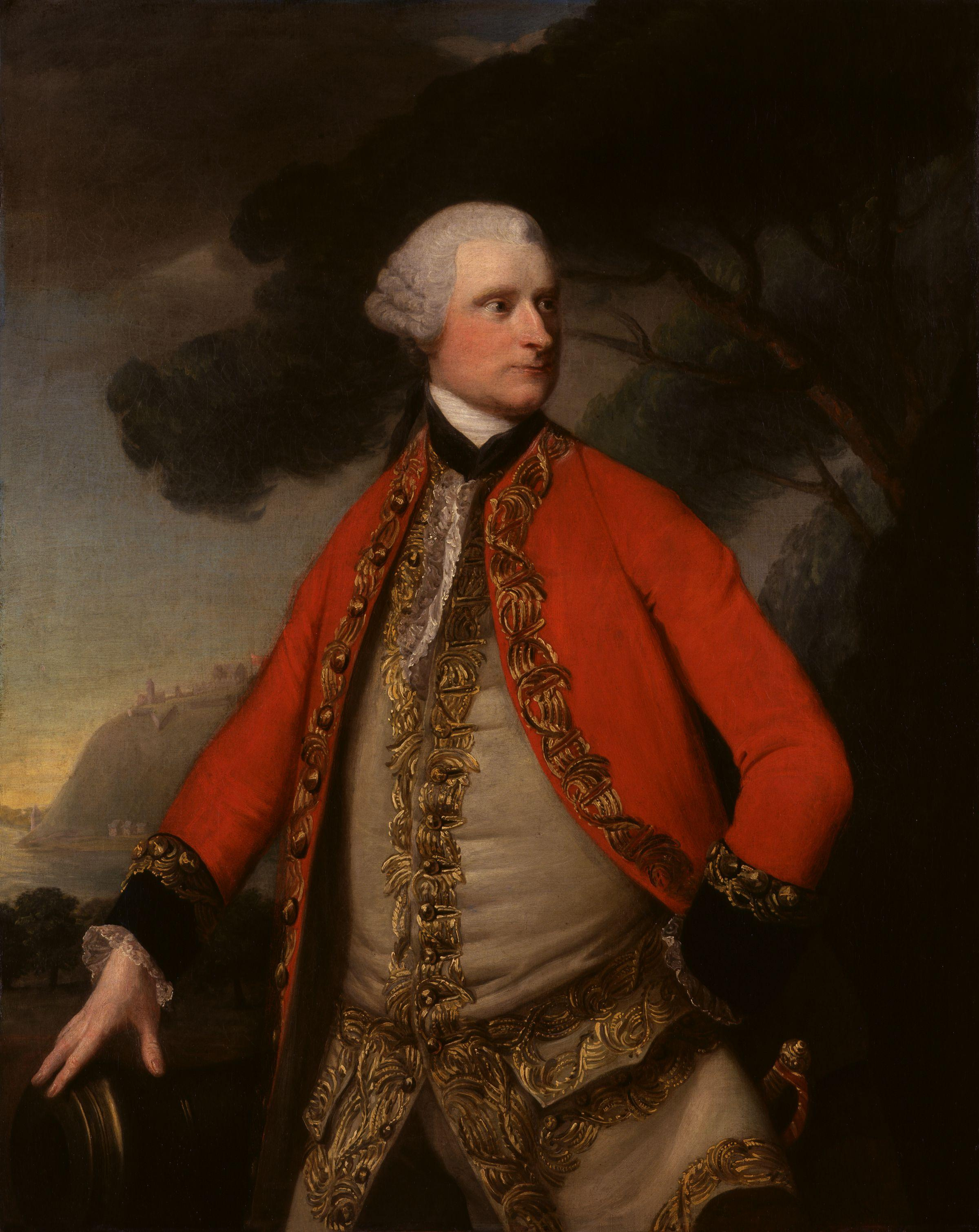
Governor of Quebec James Murray – from an unknown artist circa 1762

Murray, meanwhile, drew up plans, if the city were to fall to the French, to withdraw to the Île d'Orléans to the east and wait for reinforcements to arrive. As the French siege works began to take shape, morale plummeted for the British and teetered on the brink of anarchy. Fearing a wider breakdown in discipline, Murray ordered harsh punishments for offenders. One man was hanged on the spot for endemic drunkenness, and Murray had all the liquor in the Lower Town poured away or destroyed. Nevertheless, the French siege works were soon being bombarded with considerable accuracy, and by May 1, order, subordination, hope, and almost confidence were completely restored in Murray's army.

The city's defences, however, had been shattered by the previous year's bombardment, and it had even been suggested after its capture that the British should simply destroy the fortifications and abandon the city. Instead, work parties had tried to rebuild the fortifications, and Murray also concentrated on erecting defences beyond the city walls. The weakness of the city's defences had a major impact on his decision to confront the French in open battle, rather than remain in the city. In addition, such was the shortage of men that British officers strapped themselves into harnesses to help haul cannon into the Lower Town.

Concerned that a hostile population would add to his problems, Murray had tried to exhibit kindness to the local inhabitants if they disarmed and swore allegiance to George II. This policy had proved generally successful, although it was clear most of the inhabitants hoped for a French return. Murray had expelled several inhabitants from the city suspected of supplying intelligence to the French and of encouraging British troops to desert. On May 2, Murray ordered the few inhabitants remaining in the place to leave within three days.

=== Stalemate ===
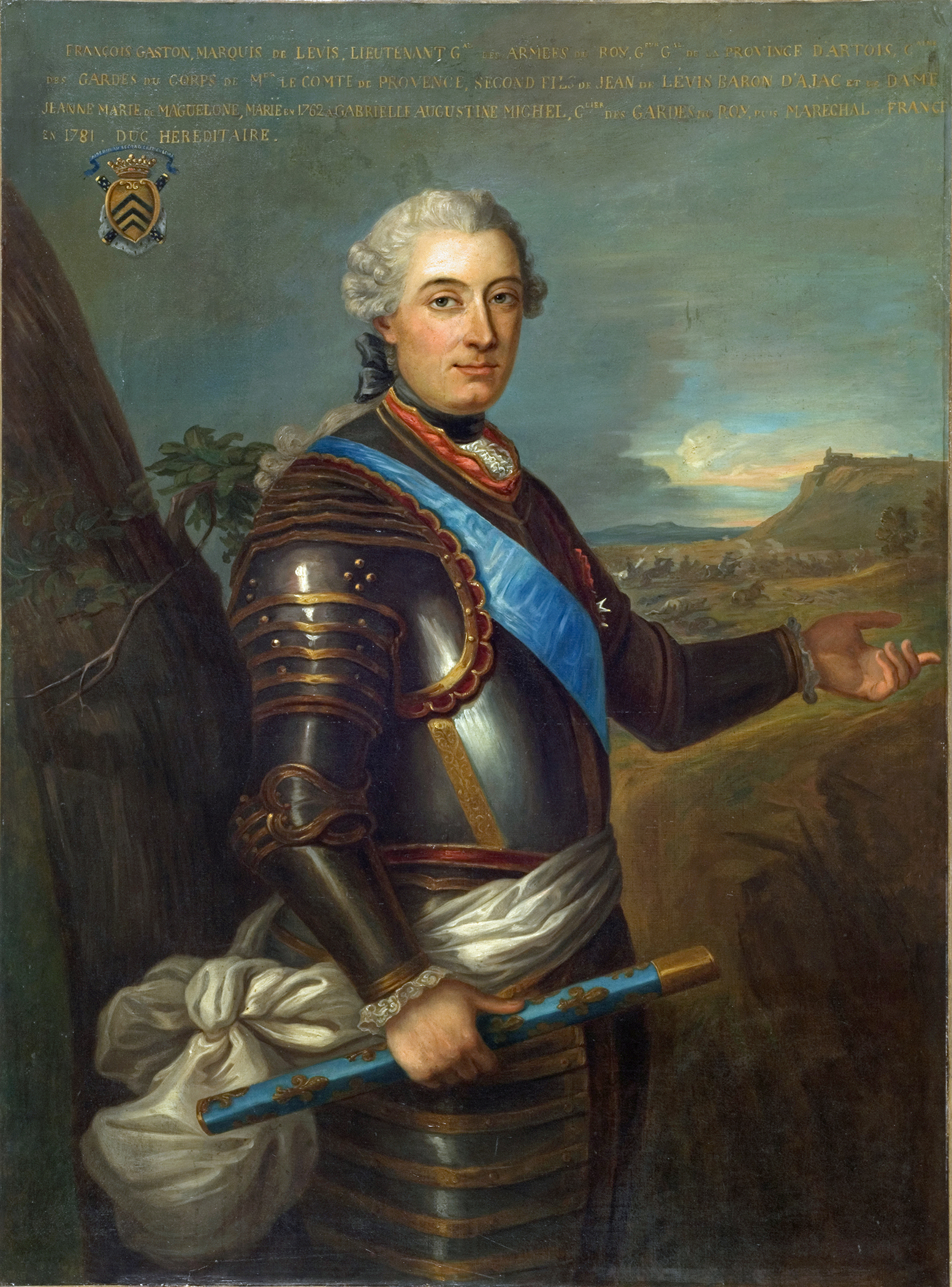
François Gaston de Lévis with Marshal's Baton

As time wore on, it became clear a stalemate had developed. The French cannons were too weak to batter down the city's defences, and the British were not strong enough to march out and drive off the more numerous French. In a common courtesy during a siege, the two commanders exchanged small gifts of food. Lévis sent spruce beer and partridges, while Murray responded with Cheshire cheese. Victory would go to whoever's ships first came up the St Lawrence carrying reinforcements.

Lévis rested his hopes on the prospect of reinforcements arriving from France, boosting his strength, and allowing him to take the city. In France, a strategic debate had been underway about the allocation of French reinforcements. French First Minister, the Duc de Choiseul, believed that French prospects were better in Europe and planned another major attack in Germany. The French hoped that if they won a major victory in Germany and occupied the Electorate of Hanover, they could negotiate the return of Canada in exchange for it when peace was agreed. An added consideration was the heavy naval defeats the British had inflicted on the French at the battles of Lagos and Quiberon Bay the previous year and a nearly-constant blockade of the French ports meant that the French Navy effectively ceased to function. In an effort to show the Canadians they had not been completely abandoned, a small group of supply ships were sent carrying 400 troops, well short of the sort of reinforcement that Lévis required and only one frigate could be spared as an escort. Even that limited relief was weakened when blockading British forces captured three of the transports shortly after they had sailed from Bordeaux in early April.

=== HMS Lowestoffe arrives ===
When the British fleet had sailed the previous year, Admiral Saunders had detached several ships to Halifax in Nova Scotia with orders to return to Quebec as soon as the ice melted.

On 9 May, a ship arrived off Pointe-Lévis; the French shouted Vive Le Roi believing the ship to be theirs, while the anxious British expected the worst. The ship however turned out to be HMS Lowestoffe, a 28-gun frigate detached from a squadron under Lord Colville who were just outside the Saint Lawrence. A twenty-one-gun salute and the hoisting of the Union flag turned British fears into sudden joy. Lévis and the French were in despair and realised that Quebec had to be bombarded into submission as quickly as possible before the main British force arrived. Murray had learned from Lowestoffe's captain that Colville's ships were soon navigating up the Saint Lawrence, already made easy by James Cook's mapping the previous year.

=== Artillery duel ===
Two days later at noon, the French batteries finally opened against the walls of Québec, which was not built to bear the brunt of heavy shot. Both sides exchanged lively fire till nightfall. A French schooner and two floating batteries passed below Québec to plant a mortar at Beauport. Over the next few days the artillery duel continued. Since taking the city, the British had built new embrasures within the walls which would enable the gunners to direct heavy counter battery fire on the French. One of Lévis' biggest handicaps was a shortage of munitions for his artillery, and the rate of fire was slow. Levis eventually ordered his men to fire only twenty rounds per gun daily.

In contrast, the British brought many heavy guns to bear on the French positions, had unloaded a number of guns from the fleet before it had sailed, and had plentiful supplies of ammunition. Gunpowder was the one substance that was in abundance in the shattered town. With 150 guns now facing the French siege positions the British were able to open up an effective fire. So heavy was the British bombardment that the French had to withdraw their main camp about a mile to protect it. During the siege, the French suffered nearly seven times as many casualties as the British. It grew so dangerous in the French entrenchments that it was reported that the Canadians had to be paid half a dollar a day to work there. During this bombardment the French suffered heavily; British shells alone killed 72 and wounded another 133.

=== Relief ===
The French relief expedition, having managed to get through the British blockade, was commanded by François-Chenard Giraudais and reached the mouth of the St Lawrence, only to discover that the British ships had entered through it six days earlier. Having arrived too late, the French did not want to risk being cut off if another fleet of British ships came up from behind. To avoid being trapped the French reluctantly decided to retreat.

Just after dusk on May 15, the first of Commodore Colville's five ships of the line appeared below the Île d'Orléans with two fresh British regiments from Louisbourg. The following morning two more British frigates under Commodore Robert Swanton arrived after having sailing upstream. Swanton in response to the expressed wishes of Murray, gave orders to HMS Diana and HMS Lowestoffe, soon followed by HMS Vanguard, to pass the town and to attack the French vessels under Captain Jean Vauquelin in the river above. Swanton forced the French to cut their cables and a running battle soon ensued. Swanton eventually drove Lévis's six smaller ones aground, British troops then took the men ashore prisoner. The frigates then lined up against the French trenches to enfilade them with grape and round shot, which forced their abandonment. Murray no longer being felt constrained by his ammunition supplies and so unleashed a tremendous barrage of artillery fire against the French, as he intended to launch an attack against the French siege positions the next morning. A total of 2,913 shots were fired by the British on this day alone, which was enough to drive the French from their trenches once more. It was reported that the French had managed to fire off only four shells in that time.

=== French retreat ===
The destruction of the French vessels was a death blow to the hopes of Lévis since they contained his stores of food and ammunition. With the bombardment knocking out his guns and causing casualties, Lévis resolved to wait for the night before he retired after which he hastened to raise the siege, leaving behind his sick and wounded as well as the siege camp. He also gave orders to throw his artillery down the cliff near Anse-au-Foulon and to distribute provisions to the troops. At 10pm, the army began its march with the cannon having been sent forward. Deserters from Lévis's camp then told Murray that the French were in full retreat from which all the British batteries opened fire at random through the darkness and sent cannonballs ricocheting over the Plains of Abraham on the heels of the retreating French army.

Murray then marched out with five battalions, the grenadiers and the light companies were to fall upon their rear. He pushed over the marsh to Ancienne-Lorette. The British captured many French stragglers but failed to overtake the main body. The French had already crossed the Cap-Rouge River, where they remained on the banks of the river.

The British naval presence was reinforced on 18 May with the arrival of Lord Colville's squadron, and two days later merchant ships carrying vital supplies started to arrive which thus marked the end of the French siege.

== Aftermath ==
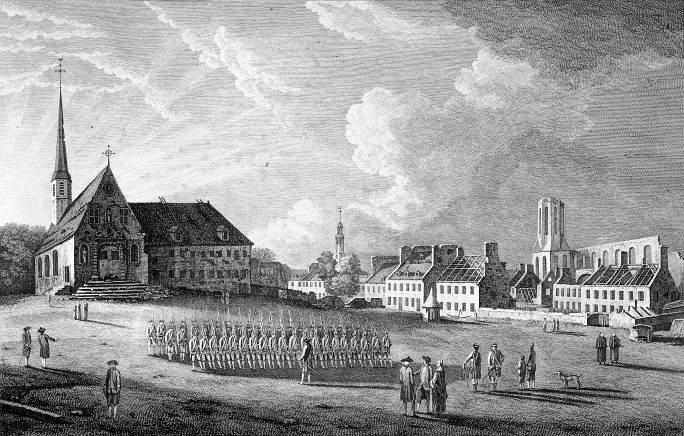
Quebec under British occupation in 1761. Print by Richard Short

British losses during the siege came to only around 30 killed or wounded, but there still around 1,000 sick from disease. For the French, losses were heavy, with 350 killed or wounded. Another 300 were captured after the relief; many of them were seriously wounded and had to be left behind. In addition, the French left behind vast stores of food, ammunition and other equipment. Such was the need to make a hasty retreat that Levis did not spike many of the guns, 55 of which were seized, ten of them heavy mortars.

After its failure to proceed up the St Lawrence, the French relief convoy had taken shelter in the Restigouche River, where there were still Acadian inhabitants loyal to France. They were defeated by the Royal Navy at the Battle of Restigouche two months later.

With Murray's forces substantially increased in Quebec, the city thus became a staging point for the conquest of the remainder of French Canada. The British strategy for capturing Montreal, the last major French stronghold, involved a three-pronged advance. Separate forces under Jeffery Amherst and William Haviland would advance from Lake Ontario in the west along the St Lawrence River and from upper New York via the Richelieu River respectively. James Murray led the third prong of 4,000 men advancing from Quebec down the St Lawrence River and approaching the Island of Montreal from the east.

Faced with such overwhelming numbers, Governor Marquis de Vaudreuil ordered Lévis, who had wanted to fight, to lay down his arms. On 8 September 1760, the city was surrendered to Amherst. The British completed their conquest of Canada by mopping up the remaining outposts such as Detroit. Lévis was later exchanged for a British prisoner and served in the later French campaigns in Europe. The French government's hopes of offsetting their loss of Canada with victories in Europe was frustrated by a series of victories by the Anglo-German forces led by the Duke of Brunswick. Also, further French colonies, particularly in the valuable West Indies, were lost, and it was agreed in the negotiations ahead of the Treaty of Paris that France would permanently cede Canada to the British in exchange for the return of Guadeloupe and Martinique.

Quebec would endure another siege in 1775, the third in sixteen years, during the American War of Independence when American rebel forces participating in the Invasion of Canada. The attack failed and the arrival of British ships down the St Lawrence the following spring forced the Americans to abandon their attempt, in a situation very similar to the relief of 1760.

== Notes ==
1. Mostly seriously wounded/sick
2. Thirty-four siege cannons, 10 field guns & 10 mortars

== Sources ==
- Anderson, Fred (2007). Crucible of War: The Seven Years' War and the Fate of Empire in British North America, 1754–1766. Knopf Doubleday Publishing Group. ISBN 978-0307425393.
- Baugh, Daniel (2014). The Global Seven Years War 1754–1763: Britain and France in a Great Power Contest. Routledge. ISBN 978-1317895466.
- Bradley, A. G (2003). The Fight with France for North America. Heritage Books. ISBN 978-0788423314.
- Brumwell, Stephen (2006). Redcoats: The British Soldier and War in the Americas, 1755–1763. Cambridge University Press. ISBN 978-0521675383.
- Carrier, Roch (2014). Montcalm and Wolfe: Two Men Who Forever Changed the Course of Canadian History. Harper Collins. ISBN 978-1443428637.
- Chet, Guy (2003). Conquering the American Wilderness: The Triumph of European Warfare in Colonial Northeast. Univ of Massachusetts Press. ISBN 978-1558493827.
- Cubbison, Douglas R (2014). All Canada in the Hands of the British: General Jeffery Amherst and the 1760 Campaign to Conquer New France. Volume 43 of Campaigns and Commanders Series. University of Oklahoma Press. ISBN 978-0806145310.
- Dunmore, John (2010). Storms and Dreams: Louis de Bougainville: Soldier, Explorer, Statesman. ReadHowYouWant.com. ISBN 978-1458794949.
- Francis, R Douglas; Jones, Richard & Smith, Donald B (2000). Origins: Canadian History to Confederation. Toronto: Harcourt Canada. ISBN 077473664X.
- Parkman, Francis (2009). Montcalm and Wolfe: The French and Indian War. BiblioLife. ISBN 978-1117791340.
- MacLeod, D. Peter (2016). Backs to the Wall: The Battle of Sainte-Foy and the Conquest of Canada. D & M Publishers. ISBN 978-1771621281.
- Manning, Stephen (2009). Quebec: The Story of Three Sieges. Continuum. ISBN 978-0773538719.
- Markham, Clements Robert; Clowes, William Laird (1996). The Royal Navy: A History from the Earliest Times to the Present. Volume 3 of The Royal Navy. Chatham Publishers. ISBN 978-1861760128.
- Marston, Daniel (2013). The Seven Years' War Essential Histories. Routledge. ISBN 978-1135975104.
- McLynn, Frank (2011). 1759: The Year Britain Became Master of the World. Random House. ISBN 978-1446449271.
- Nester, William R (2000). The First Global War: Britain, France, and the Fate of North America, 1756–1775. Greenwood Publishing Group. ISBN 978-0275967710.
- Reid, Stuart (2013). Quebec 1759: The Battle that Won Canada. Bloomsbury Publishing. ISBN 978-1472801678.
- Snow, Dan (2009). Death or Victory: The Battle for Quebec and the Birth of Empire. Harper Collins UK. ISBN 978-0007286201.
- Suthren, Victor (2000). To Go Upon Discovery: James Cook and Canada, from 1758 to 1779. Dundurn. ISBN 978-1459713062.
