= HMS Mary Galley (1744) =

Fifth-rate frigate of the Royal Navy

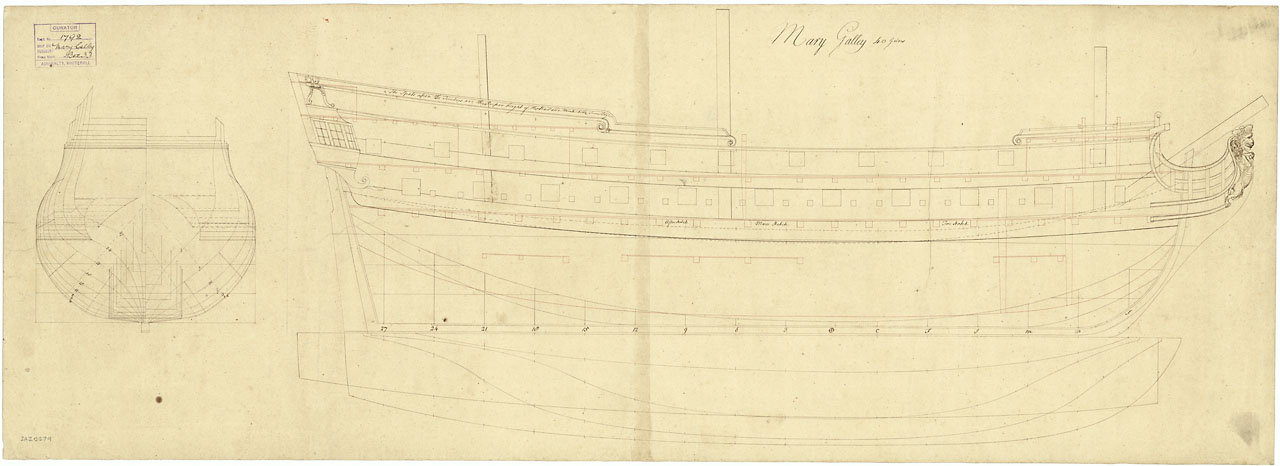
- Mary Galley

History

Great Britain
- Name: HMS Mary Galley
- Ordered: 26 April 1743
- Builder: Henry Bird, Globe Stairs, Rotherhithe
- Laid down: 18 May 1743
- Launched: 16 June 1744
- Commissioned: 13 September 1744 at Deptford dockyard
- Fate: Sunk as breakwater, Plymouth 20 April 1764

General characteristics
- Class & type: 44-gun fifth-rate frigate
- Tons burthen: 712 13/94 (bm)
- Length: 126 ft 0 in (38.4 m) (overall); 102 ft 4 in (31.2 m) (keel)
- Beam: 36 ft 2 in (11.0 m)
- Draught: 15 ft 5 in (4.7 m)
- Propulsion: Sails
- Sail plan: ship rigged
- Complement: 250
- Armament: Lower deck: 20 × 18-pdrs; Upper deck: 20 × 9-pdrs; Quarterdeck: 4 × 6-pdrs

HMS Mary Galley was a 44-gun fifth rate frigate of the Royal Navy, built in 1744 for service in the War of the Austrian Succession against France, Prussia and Spain. After two years assigned to patrol duties in the English Channel she was sent to the Caribbean to protect British commercial interests from pirate attacks. At the conclusion of the War she was returned to England in need of repair, but was instead left docked at Plymouth until 1764 when she was sunk as part of a breakwater for the port.

== Naval service ==
Mary Galley was initially commissioned under Captain Piercy Brett, but command was transferred to Captain William Dandridge before the ship was put to sea. Dandridge died on 27 August, and command passed to Robert Swanton. Under Swanton, Mary Galley undertook an extensive voyage of patrol along the Bristol Channel, the Downs and into the North Sea. In March 1746 she underwent minor repairs at Sheerness dockyard at a cost of £984.

The ship returned to sea in April 1746 and was assigned to Atlantic service off west Africa, and then to the Leeward Islands from 1747 to 1748. Returning to Plymouth Dockyard in 1749, she was surveyed for damage but not repaired and was left largely abandoned in port. In March 1764 she was offered for sale as a simple "hull ... fitted with two chain pumps and ten capstan bars." There being no purchasers the vessel was instead decommissioned and sunk as part of a breakwater in Plymouth harbour on 20 April 1764.
