= Sobieski Stuarts =

19th century British fraudsters

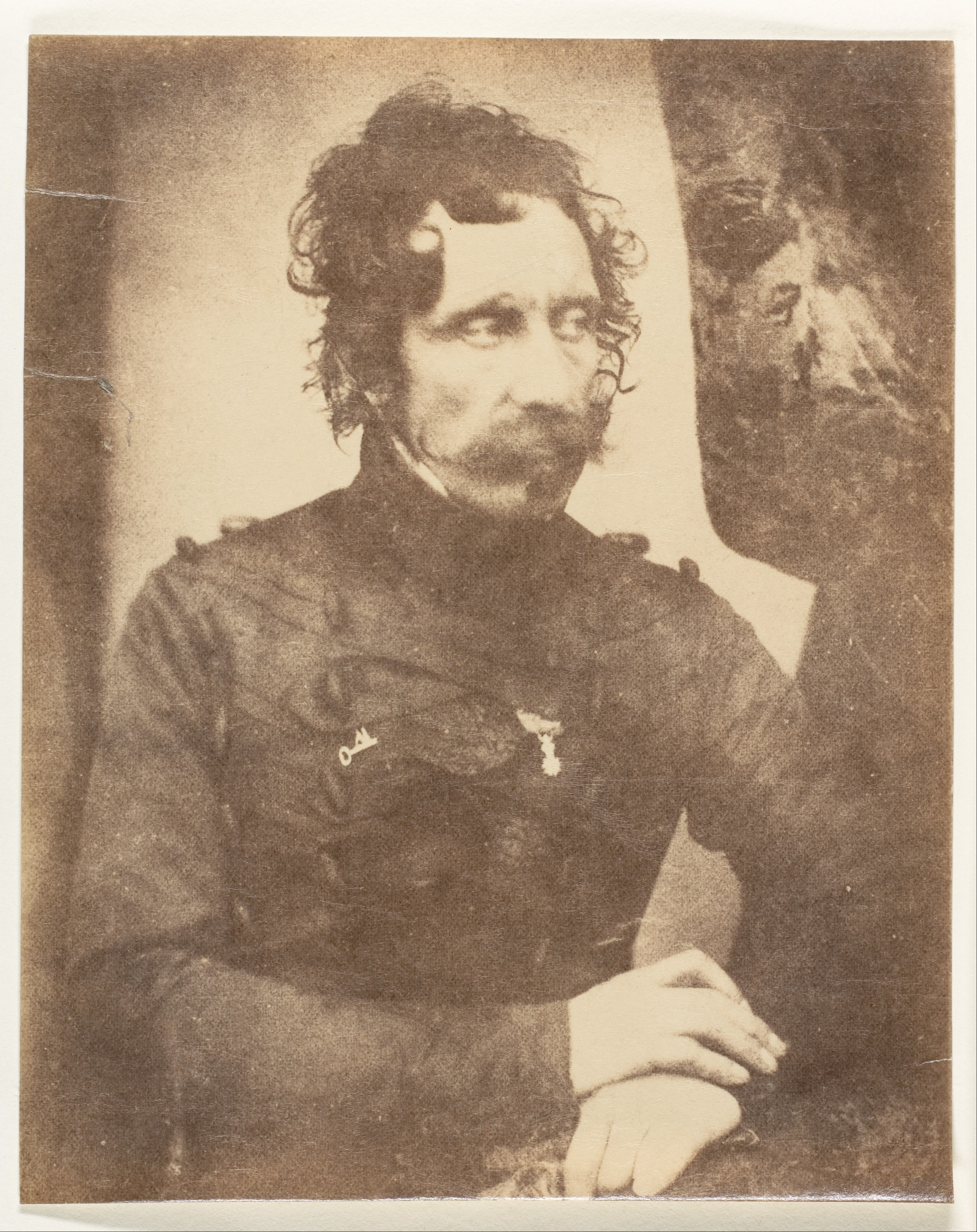
John Sobieski Stuart

In the 1820s, two brothers, John Carter Allen (1795–1872) and Charles Manning Allen (1802–1880) adopted the names John Sobieski Stuart and Charles Edward Stuart, moved to Scotland, converted to Catholicism, and about 1839 began to claim that their father, Thomas Allen (1767–1852), a former Lieutenant in the Royal Navy, had been born in Italy the only legitimate child of Prince Charles Edward Stuart and his wife Princess Louise of Stolberg-Gedern. They claimed that Thomas had, for fear of kidnapping or assassination, been brought secretly to England on a ship captained by their grandfather, Admiral John Carter Allen (1725–1800), and adopted by him. Thomas was thus, they claimed, 'de jure monarch of England in place of the then reigning sovereign Queen Victoria'.

"They succeeded in fabricating around them an aura of bogus royalty which attracted the allegiance of a few romantic Jacobites in Victorian times". Herbert Vaughan called their story "an impudent fabrication" and "an unblushing fraud" but it was as Sir Charles Petrie wrote "proof of the hold which the House of Stuart has never ceased to exercise upon popular imagination in the British Isles, so that ... if a man were to declare himself the heir to the Yorkist or Tudor dynasty, he would attract but little attention, yet if he claim to be a Stuart he will find hundreds ready to believe him".

The brothers' two publications, Vestiarium Scoticum (Edinburgh, 1842) and The Costume of the Clans (Edinburgh, 1845), described by the historian Hugh Trevor-Roper as "shot through with pure fantasy and bare faced forgery", have been sources widely used by the tartan industry in Scotland.

== Family background ==
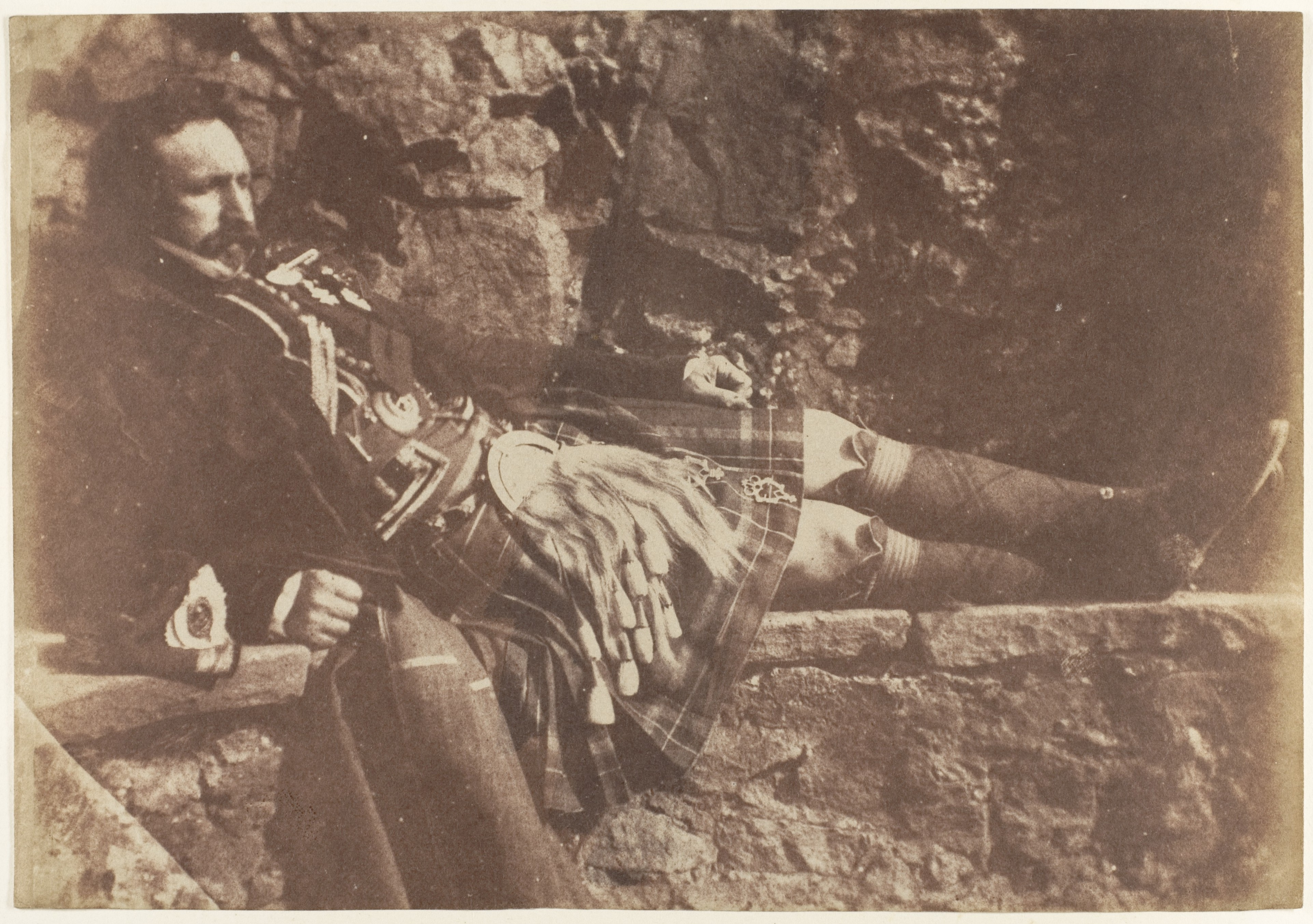
Charles Edward Stuart

The brothers' grandfather, John Carter Allen (1725–1800), an admiral in the British navy, had three children: the above-named Lieutenant Thomas Allen (1767–1852), Jane or Jean Allen (c.1768–1829) who married Thomas Robinson, a widower, at Brighton in 1788, and Admiral John Allen (1771–1853). The three were named in John Carter Allen's will, though he bequeathed only £100 to Thomas and £100 and a pair of silver candlesticks to Jane, leaving £2,200 and the residue to John. This disparity caused comment and some have speculated that Thomas was illegitimate, but an income had been guaranteed to him under his marriage settlement in 1792.

However, additional research in 2014 showed that John Carter Allen did not marry until 1780 and that his three children were all illegitimate, born in a period in which he held no commission. The three were named 'natural children of John Cator Allen' in the twelfth of sixteen codicils to the will of Elizabeth Arnold, his first wife's mother, dated in 1788 and proved in 1789. She left them twenty guineas each and £1,000 to their father. The identity of their mother(s) has not been found. There was much tension in the family later and at one time the youngest son, John, was heard to say of Thomas, 'he is no brother of mine'.

John Carter Allen himself had been baptised at St Dunstan in the West in 1724/5, the son of Carter Allen (1700–1734), an attorney in the parish of St Clement Eastcheap in the City of London, who had married Emma Hay or Hays at St Giles, Camberwell, in 1724. These details also were not known until 2014. Contemporaries of John Carter Allen had said at his death in 1800 that the late Lord Hillsborough (who died in 1793 and for whom John Carter Allen's younger brother William Allen (1729–1811) had worked as an office clerk) had said that 'he had a claim to the title of Erroll ... as being descended from the old Earl Hay in the male line', a worthless statement as the peerage had become extinct in the male line in 1717, but believed by Thomas who added Hay to his name.

However, the uncertainty of their descent and the romantic nature of the various claims surrounding them greatly influenced the two brothers. They also added Hay to their names and in 1822 the eldest son, as John Hay Allan, published a Genealogical table of the Hays, from William de Haya, cupbearer to Malcolm IV, 1170, down to 1840, with all the branches (Edinburgh, 1840), though his descent is not shown in the book and the parentage of Emma Hay or Hays has not been found.

== Thomas Allen ==
Although frequently referred to as Captain Allen, Thomas Allen never attained that rank. He retired from the Navy as a Lieutenant in 1798 and his subsequent history and movements and the extent to which he approved of his sons' later claims, are all far from clear. He had married Catherine Matilda Manning, a daughter of the Rev. Owen Manning the historian of Surrey, at Godalming in 1792. They had three children: (1) John Carter Allen, born at Oystermouth, Glamorgan, 4 August 1795 and baptised there, 5 October 1795; (2) Matilda Allen, born at Oystermouth, Glamorgan, 18 October 1799 and baptised there, 12 January 1800; and (3) Charles Manning Allen, born at Rotherfield Grays, Oxfordshire, 4 July 1802 and baptised there, 3 August 1802. Under their marriage settlement the couple and their future children had a life interest and income from properties in Mare Street and Well Street, Hackney.

However, sometime about 1807 Thomas Allen formed a connection with a much younger woman, Ann, who was born in Hackney about 1790, and by whom he had five illegitimate children between 1808 and 1829. Her surname is usually given as Salmon (as she had a niece of that name living with her in 1851) but the death certificates of several of her children show it as Burton. The first child, William (died 1878), who used the surname MacGarrow, claimed to have been born in Glamorganshire in Wales but his baptism and the exact whereabouts of Thomas and Ann at this time have not been determined. It is said that from 1816 to 1829 Thomas was based at Boulogne, 'a safe refuge for English debtors'. He certainly had increasing financial problems and in February 1817 he unsuccessfully appealed to the former Lord Chancellor, Lord Erskine, for help with the possible sale of some of the property held in trust under his marriage settlement. A last minute attempt to come to an arrangement about it failed and on 17 January 1818, as the result of an action in the Court of King's Bench against Thomas and his son John (in a plea of debt for £300 and damages by James Barstow), Thomas was imprisoned for debt in the Fleet Prison. He was released by order of the Court for Relief of Insolvent Debtors on 20 December 1819 but continued to live in fear of his creditors.

His reticence and desired anonymity was probably due to his illegitimacy and his relationship with Anne, but it was complicated by the later statements of his two legitimate sons on whom he looked with some displeasure. He had little in common with them and they in turn looked down on Anne as 'of much lower rank in life' than their mother. Thomas and Anne apparently had their last child, Gilbert Hay Allen (1829–1902), in south London in 1829 and in 1839 Thomas was in hiding at 10 Portland Place North, Clapham Road, Lambeth, as 'Mr Salmond'. In the 1841 census he was entered at that address as 'Thomas MacGaradh', aged 70, and born in Scotland. He ostensibly registered the death of his wife Catherine Matilda at Portland Place North, on 14 February 1841, again calling himself Thomas MacGaradh, but describing her as 'Matilda Manning, widow'. When the census was taken a few months later Anne was living with him at this address as Anne MacGaradh. MacGaradh was, his sons said, a war-cry of the Hay family but it was entirely their creation and it seems likely that they or Anne were responsible for their father's statements. The death of Catherine Matilda in 1841 did, however, eventually allow the purchase by Charles of the family's life interest in the trust properties from his father's bankruptcy assignees.

It is said that Thomas 'spent the last seven years of his life in bed', confined to his room at 22 Henry Street, Pentonville. He was there as 'John Salmon' when the Census was taken in 1851 and he died at that address as Thomas Hay Allen on 14 February 1852. He was buried in that name at St Giles in the Fields, Middlesex, on 23 February 1852, aged 84. His son, Charles, in order to distance himself from him, wrote in 1877 that his father was called James and had died in 1839. Some believed that he was buried at Old St Pancras, Middlesex (as stated in the introduction to the 1892 edition of his sons' The Costume of the Clans, xvii, and repeated in the Dictionary of National Biography) and Beveridge added 'but the stone said to have been placed over his grave cannot now be found'.

== Sobieski Stuarts ==
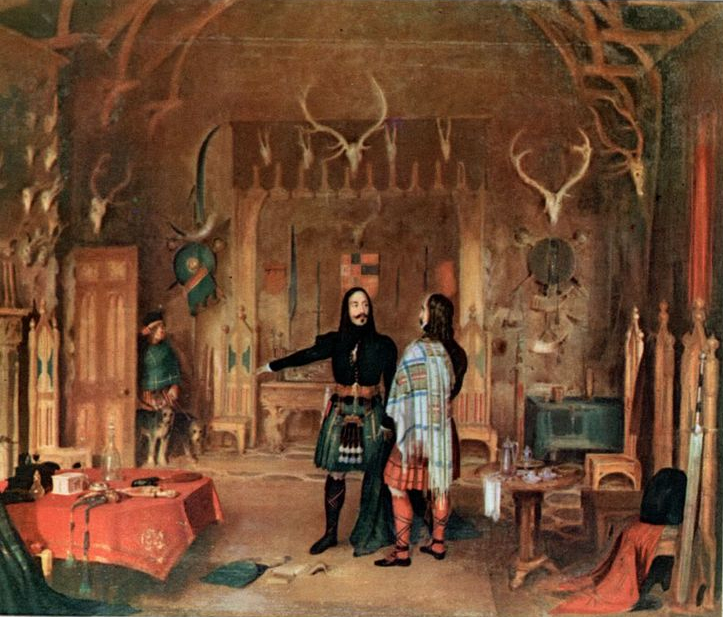
John and Charles Sobieski Stuart, a self portrait painted at Eilean Aigas, a house on the estate of, and offered to the pair by, Lord Lovat

No detail of the educations of Thomas's two sons has been found though they claimed that the secret of their royal descent had been revealed to them about 1811, that they had fought for Napoleon at Dresden (in August 1813), Leipzig (October 1813) and Waterloo (June 1815) and had learned Gaelic in London. The youngest, Charles Manning Allen, who we now know was not born until 1802, married at St George, Hanover Square, on 9 October 1822, Anna Gardiner, who had an income from property in Ireland and was the widow of Major Charles Gardiner (1780–1818), the childless only son of General William Gardiner (1748–1806) former British Minister in Brussels and Warsaw and younger brother of Luke Gardiner, 1st Viscount Mountjoy (1745–1798). The marriage was publicised as that of 'Charles Stuart Hay Allen'. However, the couple moved to Scotland after marriage and their first child, Anna Marie Stuart, born 27 July 1823, was baptised at Edinburgh and there recorded in the surname Hay on 20 October 1823.

Thomas's eldest son, John Carter Allen, calling himself John Hay Allan, had apparently already been in Scotland for some time and in 1822 he published a volume of poems, Bridal of Caolchairn, and other poems (London, 1822) dedicated to the Duke of Argyll, and revealing a fair knowledge of that county but including several allusions to his claimed descent from the Hays of Erroll. From 1826 to 1829, John joined his brother Charles at Windy Hill (now Milton Brodie), Alves, Morayshire, under the patronage of the Earl of Moray. The brothers were at Logie House, Edinkillie, Morayshire, from 1829 to 1838, when John used the name Stuart Allan. As John Sobieski Stuart he and his brother, calling themselves 'grandsons to the Pretender', had visited Ireland in May 1836. Lord Lovat then built 'an antique shooting lodge' for them on Eilean Aigas, an islet in the river Beauly, near Eskadale, Inverness, and there, always wearing the Stuart tartan, they held court from 1838 to 1845, attending the Catholic church at Eskadale and being known as 'the Princes'. The house is described as 'a very elegant mansion of the Elizabethan style' in the New Statistical Account of Scotland (1842). On 18 October 1845, John married at St Martin-in-the-Fields, Westminster, Georgina, eldest surviving daughter of Edward Kendall, J.P., of Austrey, Warwickshire. She had, he told Robert Chambers, 'only ten thousand pounds, unless she survives her two sisters, who equally share with her', but the couple then moved to live in London. In his letter to Chambers just prior to the marriage John asked for a loan of £100 until his wife's dividends were paid but when his father-in-law eventually died in March 1872 the total estate was sworn at 'under £1,500' and later as 'under £2,000'.

Thomas Allen's daughter Matilda had married Henry Timothy Boisquet de la Fleuriere, at St Alphege, Greenwich, in 1818, and their son, Napoleon de la Fleuriere (1823–1881), was baptised at St Margaret, Westminster, in 1823. According to Matilda, her husband had been in the French service from 1804 to 1814 and from 1832 to 1853, but had been taken prisoner at Trafalgar and did not return to France until 1830. In 1835 using the name Matilda McFleur she then married at St Mary Abbots, Kensington, one Alexander McCaskery (died 1870), a police serjeant in Fulham, by whom she had at least three children. This seems not to have stopped her from soliciting the Cross of an Officer of the Legion d'Honneur for Henry Timothy in 1854. Her date of death has not been found.

In Scotland the brothers 'conducted themselves as members of a reigning dynasty who wished to preserve their incognito' and their claims 'were accorded a level of credence' (as the Dictionary of National Biography said at the end of the century) by 'men of rank and intelligence, such as the tenth Earl of Moray (1771–1848), the fourteenth Lord Lovat (1802–1875), the late Marquis of Bute (1793–1848), Thomas Dick-Lauder (1784–1848), and Robert Chambers (1802–1871)'. However, the delusional John Sobieski Stuart, in spite of his expressed desire to withdraw from the public eye, went so far as to claim, in a letter to Chambers, that he and his brother had 'a body of supporters ready to push their claims to the uttermost'.

== The claims ==
In June 1829 the elder brother had shown a manuscript, containing tartan patterns and dated in 1721, to Sir Thomas Dick-Lauder who was much impressed by it, but Sir Walter Scott warned Dick-Lauder that the brothers 'are men of warm imaginations ... of much accomplishment but little probity – that is, in antiquarian matters'. Sir Walter Scott, who died in 1832, had rejected the entire notion of clan tartans, saying that the 'idea of distinguishing the clans by their tartans is but a fashion of modern date'. On behalf of the Society of Scottish Antiquaries he was shown a transcript of part of the brothers' manuscript but from its language alone 'indignantly declared his conviction that the MS itself must be an absolute fabrication'. Scott remembered seeing one of the brothers wearing the badge of High Constable of Scotland (as the Earls of Erroll were), 'which he could have no more right to wear than the Crown'. Dick-Lauder was himself an author of historical romances and had put up a monument to the Lauder family in Edinburgh showing a quite spurious descent, but one 'as he wished it to be'.

Publishing anonymously, John penned a number of historical fictions during the early 1830s, including a number of stories which the pair hinted at in their 1847 poetry collection, 'Lays of the Deer Forest', as 'Stuart Tales'. These appeared in the Royal Lady's Magazine between 1831 and 1834, and were published almost simultaneously alongside the 'Tales of the Cavalier,' which were precursors to their much later novel, 'Tales of the Century' (1846), and by a series of 'Tales of the Scottish Border' and 'Legends of the Alhambra,' all published either anonymously, or signed with a 'Σ'.

However, calling himself John Sobieski Stuart, the elder brother then produced the lavish Vestiarium Scoticum (Edinburgh, 1842), costing ten guineas, which purported to be a reproduction, with colour illustrations, of a better version of the 1721 manuscript, this one being dated to 1571. This John claimed had passed through the hands of Prince Charles Edward Stuart to his father Thomas, though his father's letter on the subject, addressed to him as Ian and signed 'J. T. Stuart Hay' in 1829, seems likely to be bogus.

Considerable interest in clans and tartans continued, and the following year, under the name John Sobieski Stolberg Stuart, John and his brother Charles published The Costume of the Clans: with observations upon the literature, arts, manufactures and commerce of the Highland and Western Isles during the middle ages; and the influence of the sixteenth, seventeenth and eighteenth centuries upon their present condition (Edinburgh, 1845) which, as noted above, received intense criticism.

Using the names John Sobieski Stuart and Charles Edward Stuart the brothers followed this with their Tales of the Century, or sketches of the romances of history between 1745 and 1845 (Edinburgh, 1847) in which they provided three scenes of the birth, youth and marriage of a man known by the Gaelic name of Iolair dhearg or the Red Eagle, said to have been recounted by an aged Jacobite in exile, Dr Beaton. After being called to attend the birth of a son to a young woman in Tuscany in 1773, where portraits of the Old and Young Pretenders were prominent, Beaton claimed to have been sworn to secrecy, but later to have seen a baby taken on board a British warship, HMS Albina, under Commodore O'Haloran. In the second tale, some years later, the grown child arrived in the Western Highlands of Scotland where, although called O'Haloran and thought to be the son of the former captain, he is known as The Red Eagle and addressed as a prince. In the third tale, which takes place in the Peak District of Derbyshire, a traveller meets The Red Eagle who, after various adventures, marries at Berwick, Catharine Bruce, the daughter of a Derbyshire local landowner.

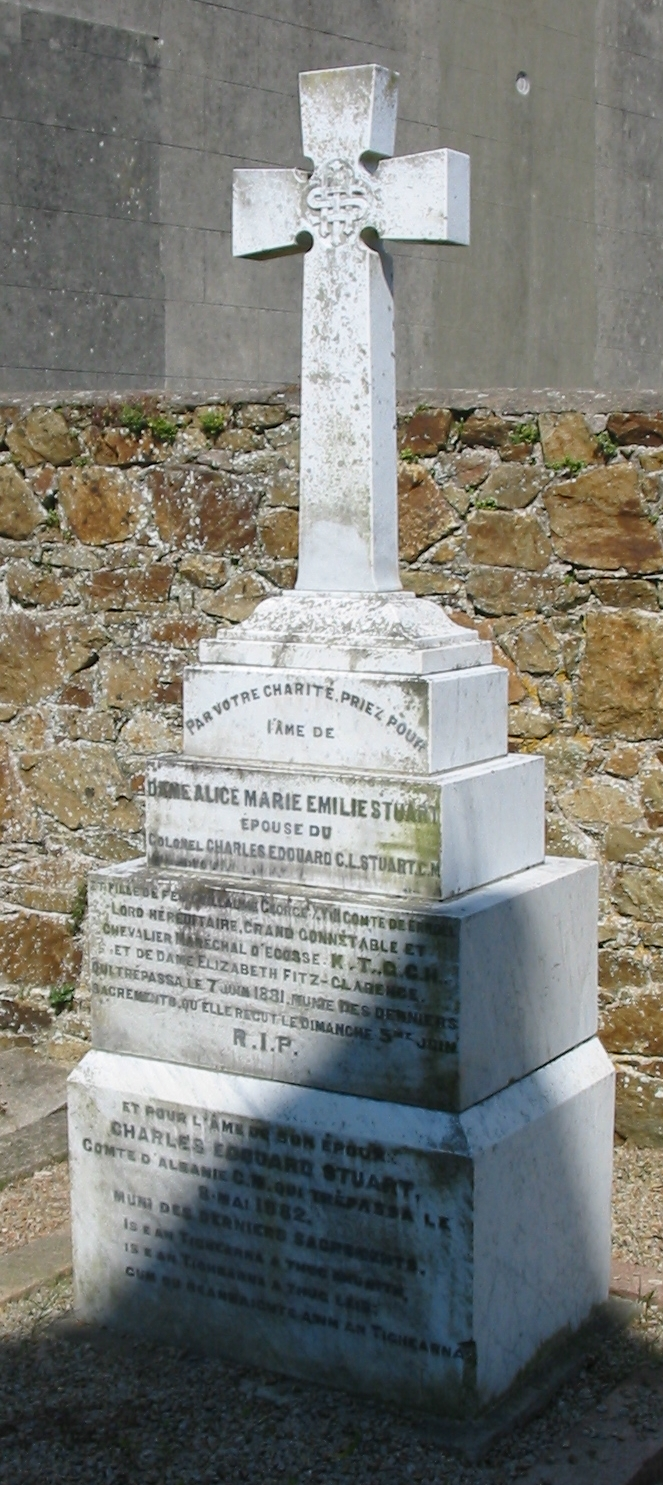
The gravestone of Charles Edward Louis Casimir Stuart and Lady Alice Hay shows the pretended title of Comte d'Albanie

The stories, taken together, were designed in a roundabout way to suggest that the brothers' supposed grandfather was in reality Commodore O'Haloran, and that the child, their father (known as Thomas Allen), was in reality the child of Prince Charles Edward Stuart and Louise of Stolberg, and thus de jure monarch of England. William Donaldson has characterised the work as an act of "solemn self-projection" into a tradition of political myth-making long-established in Scotland. Although the tales were 'copiously augmented with historical notes', in truth Admiral John Carter Allen did not command any ship in 1773, being on half-pay from 1771 to 1775.

A strong attack on both the Vestiarium Scoticum and their Tales of the Century then followed and the brothers' ancestral claims, which had received little acceptance in England, and the Vestiarium were completely discredited in a devastating anonymous article 'The heirs of the Stuarts', believed to be by George Skene (1807–1875), Professor of Law at Glasgow University, which appeared in the Quarterly Review, vol. 81 (June–September 1847) 57-85. He concluded about the Vestiarium that 'this pretended MS of the sixteenth century is an absolute fabrication, and of no authority whatever' and about the Tales that Prince Charles Edward Stuart 'could have had no possible reason for concealing the birth of an heir'; any idea that he had 'left a legitimate male progeny' was 'the silliest of dreams'.

In 1848 John attempted A reply to the Quarterly Review upon the Vestiarium Scoticum (Edinburgh, 1848) and the two brothers then produced Lays of the deer forest: with sketches of olden and modern deer-hunting (2 vols. Edinburgh, 1848), but three of their benefactors, the Earl of Moray, the Marquis of Bute and Thomas Dick-Lauder, died that year and the brothers were now so discredited that Charles took his wife to Prague where their son was in the Austrian army and John followed soon after. John's wife died at Presburg in 1862 and the brothers did not return to England until 1868. In London they then occupied themselves with research, being well-known figures in the British Museum, wearing Highland dress or military tunics and using pens embellished with gold coronets.

John, who called himself 'The Chevalier John Sobieski Stewart', in 1871 described himself as Count d'Albanie, Colonel of Hussars, and said that he was born at Versailles, France. He died without issue at 52 Stanley Street, St George Hanover Square, 13 February 1872, aged 74, and was buried at Eskadale. His widow died at Bath in 1888.

John's brother Charles then assumed the title of Count of Albany and was active in Catholic circles in London but died from the same address (by then called 52 Alderney Street) on a trip to France on the Steamer Rainbow near Bordeaux, 24 December 1880, and was buried at Eskadale. His son Charles Edward Stuart Allen, the last self-styled Count of Albany, died in Jersey in 1882. He had married Lady Alice Hay (1835–1881), a daughter of the 18th Earl of Erroll and Elizabeth Fitzclarence (a daughter of King William IV ), but they had no issue.

== Other literary activity ==
Study of correspondence in the Chiddingstone archives has enabled Craig Buchanan to identify Charles Edward Stuart, his daughter Maria, and sister-in-law Georgina as the authors of travel-related articles published in the magazine Once a Week in 1860. Buchanan also suggests that John Sobieski Stuart was the author of six articles published under the series title "Tales of the Gael" in William Motherwell's short-lived daily literary magazine The Day between February and April 1832.

== Additional sources ==
- Buchanan, Craig. "The Sobieski Stuart Compositions," Notes & Queries, 61.4 (November 2014): 531-36.
- Buchanan, Craig (October 2021), "The Sobieski Stuarts and the Royal Lady's Magazine: Some Newly Attributed Tales", Studies in Scottish Literature, 47 (1): 105–121, Studies in Scottish Literature, vol. 47, no. 1 (October 2021), 105–121.
- Camp, Anthony. "New Light on the Sobieski Stuarts", in Genealogists Magazine, vol. 31, no. 8 (December 2014) 298-306.
- Fraser, Marie, John Sobieski Stolberg Stuart & Charles Edward Stuart.
- Reynolds, K. D. "Stuart, John Sobieski Stolberg". Oxford Dictionary of National Biography (online ed.). Oxford University Press. (Subscription, Wikipedia Library access or UK public library membership required.)
- Robb, Steven. "The Sobieski Stuart Brothers", Royal Stuart Review 2003.
- Trevor-Roper, Hugh (1983). "The Highland Tradition of Scotland". In Hobsbawm, Eric; Ranger, Terence (eds.). The Invention of Tradition. Cambridge University Press. ISBN 0-521-24645-8 – via Internet Archive.
- Catalogue, UK: Copac.
- Catalogue, National Library of Scotland.
- Catalogue, British Library.
