= Robert Swanton =

Royal Navy officer (c. 1710–1765)

Rear-Admiral Robert Swanton
- Born: c. 1710
- Died: 11 July 1765 (aged c. 55)
- Allegiance: Great Britain
- Branch: Royal Navy
- Service years: 1724-1764
- Rank: Rear-Admiral
- Commands: HMS Mary Galley; HMS Hampton Court; HMS Vanguard; Leeward Islands Station
- Conflicts: Seven Years' War; Siege of Louisbourg; Battle of Pointe-aux-Trembles
- Children: 1 daughter

Rear-Admiral Robert Swanton (c. 1710 – 11 July 1765) was a Royal Navy officer who became commander-in-chief of the Leeward Islands Station.

== Naval career ==
Swanton joined the Royal Navy on 8 September 1724 as a cadet.

He was given an operational post as lieutenant in January 1734. In May 1735, he was serving on HMS Rippon moving to HMS Oxford in April 1737. In February 1738, he moved to HMS Flamborough on which he was part of the attack on St Augustine in 1740.

Promoted to captain in 1743, he took command of the fifth-rate HMS Mary Galley in August 1744, the third-rate HMS Hampton Court in 1757 and the third-rate HMS Vanguard later that year. In HMS Vanguard, he saw action at the Siege of Louisbourg in 1758 and at the Battle of Pointe-aux-Trembles in 1760 during the French and Indian War. He became commander-in-chief of the Leeward Islands Station in 1763.

He died in Westminster on 11 July 1765.

== Family ==
His wife Emma died in 1822. They had a daughter, Frances (d. 1841).

He was brother-in-law to Admiral John Carter Allen.

Military offices
| Preceded by Sir William Burnaby | Commander-in-Chief, Leeward Islands Station; 1763–1764 | Succeeded by Richard Tyrell |
