= HMS Sapphire (1758) =

HMS Sapphire was a 32-gun Royal Navy frigate launched in 1758 to serve in the Seven Years' War.

== Service history ==
Battle of Quiberon Bay

She was originally commissioned under the name of Captain Temple West and built as a hull at Carter's Yard in Limehouse before going to Deptford for creation of her superstructure, launching in 1741. At this stage she had 44 guns and a crew of 250.

Despite moderate success she did not handle well and she was paid off in 1748 and sent to Deptford to cut her down in size. She was then rebuilt by Adam Hayes at Deptford Dockyard and was launched on 22 June 1758, under command of the renowned Captain John Strachan with a crew of 210 men.

Sapphire had a brief but active career under Strachan:

- 1 February 1759 captured the French privateer "Le Saint Michel" under temporary command of John Carter Allen
- 20 November 1759 played an important role in the huge Battle of Quiberon Bay against the assembled French fleet

In 1760 she joined the Western Squadron and was based off Le Havre capturing the French privateer "Le Saint Claud" on 2 February 1761.

She was paid off in March 1763 after less than 5 years service, as unaffordable to repair and sold at Sheerness in March 1764 for £200 (her original build cost was almost £11,000). Her fate is then unknown.
