= HMS Sapphire (1827) =

Ship of the line of the Royal Navy

History

United Kingdom
- Name: HMS Sapphire
- Laid down: November 1825
- Launched: 30 January 1827

General characteristics
- Tons burthen: 604
- Length: 120 ft 0 in (36.58 m)
- Beam: 34 ft 0 in (10.36 m)
- Propulsion: Sails
- Sail plan: Full-rigged ship
- Complement: 175 officers and men
- Armament: 28 guns:

HMS Sapphire was a 28-gun Royal Navy sixth-rate launched in 1827 and sold in 1864.

== Description and service history ==
HMS Sapphire was laid down in November 1825 and launched on 30th January 1827. She was measured at 604 tons, and was 120 ft 0 in (36.58 m) in length with a 34 ft 0 in (10.36 m) beam. Mounting 28 guns, mostly 32 pounders, she carried a crew of 175 officers and men.

HMS Sapphire saw service in China during the First Opium War (1839–1842). In China the ship was used to transport troops along the coast. It became a receiving ship at Trincomalee (in Ceylon) HMS Sapphire was sold out of the Royal Navy in 1864.
