= HMS Vanguard (1748) =

Ship of the line of the Royal Navy

- Vanguard

History

Great Britain
- Name: HMS Vanguard
- Ordered: 3 October 1745
- Builder: Ewer, East Cowes
- Laid down: November 1745
- Launched: 16 April 1748
- Commissioned: March 1748
- Fate: Sold out of the service, 1774

General characteristics
- Class & type: 1745 Establishment 70-gun third rate ship of the line
- Tons burthen: 1,419 23/94 (bm)
- Length: 160 ft (48.8 m) (gundeck)
- Beam: 45 ft (13.7 m)
- Depth of hold: 19 ft 4 in (5.9 m)
- Propulsion: Sails
- Sail plan: Full-rigged ship
- Armament: 70 guns: Gundeck: 26 × 32 pdrs; Upper gundeck: 28 × 18 pdrs; Quarterdeck: 12 × 9 pdrs; Forecastle: 4 × 9 pdrs

HMS Vanguard was a 70-gun third rate ship of the line of the Royal Navy, launched on 16 April 1748. She was built by Philemon Ewer at his East Cowes yard on the Isle of Wight to the draught specified by the 1745 Establishment, at a cost of £8,009. She was the fourth vessel of the Royal Navy to bear the name Vanguard.

She took part in the capture of Louisbourg in 1758 under Admiral Edward Boscawen, and in the capture of Quebec during the battle of Quebec in 1759 under Admiral Charles Saunders.

The following year, during the French siege of Quebec Vanguard sailing up the Saint Lawrence River pursued two French frigates along with HMS Diana. The Atlante, commanded by Jean Vauquelin, and the Pomone sunk, and the important personnel were taken prisoner. In 1762, under the command of Sir George Rodney, she took part in the capture of Martinique.

Vanguard was sold out of the navy in 1774.
