= Legislative Council of Upper Canada =

Historical upper house of the province of Upper Canada

Type
- Type: Upper house of the Parliament of Upper Canada

History
- Founded: 1791
- Disbanded: 1841
- Preceded by: Council for the Affairs of the Province of Quebec
- Succeeded by: Legislative Council of the Province of Canada

The Legislative Council of Upper Canada was the upper house of the Parliament of Upper Canada, the legislature of the colonial government of Upper Canada in British North America. Modelled after the British House of Lords, it was created by the Constitutional Act 1791 (Note: Constitution Act 1791 was the colloquial short title commonly used in Canada, but a legally sanctioned one until 1985. The legally sanctioned short title for the act was The Clergy Endowments (Canada) Act, 1791.) and was in operation between 1792 and 1841.

The Legislative Council was noted for its routine disregard for the will of the elected lower house, the House of Assembly of Upper Canada. Due to the heavily overlapping membership between the Legislative Council and the Executive Council, and to the Family Compact's dominance in these two councils, the Legislative Council was, as observed by Earl of Durham in his consequential report, "practically hardly any thing but a veto in the hands of public functionaries on all the acts of that popular branch of the legislature in which they were always in a minority. This veto they used without much scruple." Upon the union of Upper Canada and Lower Canada in 1841 as the Province of Canada, the functions of the Legislative Council was assumed by a similarly named successor body, the Legislative Council of the Province of Canada. Both bodies were predecessors of today's Senate of Canada.

== Composition ==
The Constitution Act 1791 specified that the Legislative Council shall consist of at least seven members, each of no less than twenty-one years of age. Members were appointed by the Lieutenant Governor for life but could be removed for limited grounds including swearing allegiance to a foreign power, non-attendance of four consecutive years, and treason. Since the council was modelled after the House of Lords, the enabling legislation provided for the ability to attach membership to hereditary titles grant through letters patent. While three residents of Upper Canada were created baronets, (Note: Sir Roger Hale Sheaffe (Loyalist General, Lieutenant Governor 1812–13) in 1813; Sir David William Smith (Speaker of the Legislative Assembly 1796–1800, 1801–04) in 1821; Sir George Arthur (Lieutenant Governor 1838–41) in 1841. Sir John Beverley Robinson, who was a Legislative Councillor, was not created a Baronet until 1854.) no legislative council membership were attached to their baronetcies.

The first nine members of the council were appointed on 12 July 1792. Upon parliament being summoned on 17 September 1792, William Osgoode, James Baby, Robert Hamilton, Richard Cartwright, John Munro, Alexander Grant and Peter Russell took their oaths and were seated, with Osgoode being Speaker. Richard Duncan did not take his seat until June 1793. William Robertson resigned without having taken his seat.

The extensive overlap of the council membership with the membership of the Executive Council started right from their inaugural appointments by Lieutenant Governor John Graves Simcoe. The five executive councillors he appointed in 1792 were all concurrently legislative councillors: William Osgoode, James Baby, Alexander Grant, William Robertson and Peter Russell. Of the thirty-eight executive councillors of Upper Canada, only twelve were not concurrently legislative councillors. Of the twelve, six were senior British Army officers, and two were sons of legislative councillors.

The Legislative Council was dissolved on 10 February 1841 when Upper and Lower Canada were united into the Province of Canada. Some members were reappointed to the Legislative Council of the united Province of Canada.

=== Speaker ===
The Constitution Act 1791 authorized the provincial governor to appoint or remove the Legislative Council's speaker. By custom, the Chief Justice of the Court of King's Bench were appointed as the Speaker of the Legislative Council for much of Upper Canada's existence, with only two exceptions.

- 1792–1794 - William Osgoode
- 1795–1796 - Peter Russell (while the office of the Chief Justice was vacant)
- 1796–1802 - John Elmsley
- 1803–1806 - Henry Allcock
- 1806–1816 - Thomas Scott
- 1816–1825 - William Dummer Powell
- 1825–1829 - William Campbell
- 1829–1840 - John Beverley Robinson
- April 1839 – June 1840 - Jonas Jones (interim while Robinson on leave)

== List of Members of the Legislative Council ==
under Ended: Re-appointed to Legislative Council of the Province of Canada
under ExCo: Member of Executive Council of Upper Canada † Died in office

Member	Town	Appointed	Ended	ExCo	Notes
James Baby	Sandwich	12 July 1792	† 19 Feb 1833		
Richard Cartwright	Kingston	12 July 1792	† 27 July 1815		
Richard Duncan	Williamsburgh	12 July 1792	1805		Removed for non-attendance; (Note: returned to the United States and died in Schenectady, New York in 1819)
Alexander Grant	York	12 July 1792	† May 1813		
Robert Hamilton	Niagara	12 July 1792	† 8 March 1809		
John Munro	Eastern District	12 July 1792	† October 1800		
William Osgoode	York	12 July 1792	24 Feb 1794		Departed to assumed chief justiceship of Lower Canada (Note: Appointed Chief Justice of Lower Canada 24 February 1794 but remained in Upper Canada and attended Council to prorogation of 3rd session of 1st parliament (9 July 1794)) (Note: Chief Justice of Lower Canada 1794–1801; retired and died in London, Ontario)
William Robertson	Sandwich	12 July 1792	4 Nov 1792		Resigned, did not take seat; (Note: Left for Montreal in 1797; moved to London, England 1800 and died there in 1806)
Peter Russell	York	12 July 1792	† 30 Sep 1808		
Æneas Shaw	York	19 June 1794	† 6 February 1814		
Jacob Mountain	Quebec City	1 July 1794	† 25 June 1825		Excused from attendence (Note: Anglican Bishop of Quebec and founder of the Church of England in the Canadas)
John Elmsley Sr.	York	10 Dec 1796	13 October 1802		Appointed Chief Justice of Lower Canada (Note: Died in Montreal, April 1805)
John McGill	York	10 June 1797	† 31 Dec 1834		
Henry Allcock	York	4 January 1803	1 July 1805		Appointed Legislative Councillor of Lower Canada (Note: Moved to Lower Canada; later Speaker of the Legislative Council of Lower Canada; died in office at Quebec City in 1808)
Thomas Scott	York	7 August 1806	† 29 July 1824		
Thomas Talbot	Port Talbot	September 1809	10 Feb 1841		(Note: Died in London, Ontario in 1853)
William Claus	Niagara	1 February 1812	† 11 Nov 1826		(Note: Indian Department official, Justice of the Peace; died of cancer)
Thomas Clark	Chippawa	16 Nov 1815	† 13 October 1835		
William Dickson	Niagara	16 Nov 1815	10 Feb 1841		(Note: Retired to Niagara and died there in 1846)
Thomas Fraser	Ernestown	16 Nov 1815	1819		(Note: Status unknown after 1819; died in South Dundas, Ontario in 1821)
Neil McLean	Cornwall	16 Nov 1815	Not applicable		Never attended
William Dummer Powell	York	21 March 1816	† 6 Sep 1834		
John Strachan	York	10 July 1820	10 Feb 1841		(Note: Resigned office due to the Act of Union 1840, but remained an active member of the Family Compact)
Angus McIntosh	Sandwich	11 July 1820	† 24 July 1833		Excused form attendence; left Upper Canada 1831 (Note: returned to Scotland)
Joseph Wells	York	12 July 1820	10 Feb 1841		(Note: Bursar of King's College)
Duncan Cameron	York	12 July 1820	† 9 Sep 1838		
George Herchmer Markland	York	14 July 1820	10 Feb 1841		Ceased attendence after 1838 due to sex scandal (Note: Also resigned as executive councillor; withdrawn from public life in exchange for inquiry against him being buriedBurns, Robert J. (1976). "Markland, George Herchmer (Herkimer)". In Halpenny, Francess G. (ed.). Dictionary of Canadian Biography. Vol. IX (1861–1870) (online ed.). University of Toronto Press.)
George Crookshank	York	1 January 1821	10 Feb 1841		(Note: Commissariat of supplies for Fort York; Assistant Commissary General 1814–1819, Receiver General of Public Accounts (1819–1820); Director of the Bank of Upper Canada 1822–1827)
John Henry Dunn	York	1 March 1822	10 Feb 1841		Appointed exexcutive councillor and was elected to the Legislative Assembly upon the union (Note: Receiver General 1820–41, later for the Province of Canada 1841–43; and member of Legislative Assembly of the Province of Canada 1841–1843 for Toronto)
Thomas Ridout	York	11 October 1825	† 8 February 1829		
William Allan	York	12 October 1825	10 Feb 1841		Retired from politics upon the union (Note: died in 1853)
William Campbell	York	10 October 1826	† 18 January 1834		
Peter Robinson	York	6 January 1829	† 8 July 1838		
Charles Jones	Brockville	7 January 1829	† 21 August 1840		
James Gordon	Amherstburg	8 January 1829	10 Feb 1841		(Note: Not initially reappointed upon the union, but appointed later in October 1845.)
John Beverley Robinson	York	1 January 1830	10 Feb 1841		(Note: Provincial Secretary 1817–1838, appointed Chief Justice 1829 and as such after union until 1862; created a baronet in 1854, died in 1863)
John Kirby	Kingston	1831	10 Feb 1841		(Note: died in Kingston in 1846)
Augustus Warren Baldwin	York	26 January 1831	10 Feb 1841		
Zacheus Burnham	Cobourg	26 January 1831	10 Feb 1841		(Note: died in Cobourg in 1857)
John Elmsley	York	26 January 1831	10 Feb 1841		(Note: Royal Navy Captain, entrepreneur, and philanthropist; supported Catholic education in York/Toronto; son of the second Chief Justice of Upper Canada John Elmsley.)
Alexander Macdonell	Eastern District	27 January 1831	1841		
Walter Boswell	Cobourg	29 January 1831	10 Feb 1841		(Note: Royal Navy Captain, church warden of St. Peter's Anglican Church in Cobourg)
John Hamilton	Queenston	29 January 1831	10 Feb 1841		
Peter Adamson	Esquesing	2 February 1831	10 Feb 1841		(Note: Peninsular War veteran, general, and mill owner)
James Kerby	Kingston	2 March 1831	10 Feb 1841		(Note: Militia captain (Incorporated Militia), businessman, justice of the peace, and mill owner)
James Crooks	W. Flamborough	16 March 1831	10 Feb 1841		
Alexander Macdonell	Kingston	12 October 1831	† 14 January 1840		(Note: Roman Catholic Chaplain of the Glengarry Fencibles; Auxiliary Bishop of Quebec; Bishop of Kingston; founder of Regiopolis College, Kingston.)
Alexander Grant	Brockville	19 Nov 1831	10 Feb 1841		Excused, ceased attendence after 1932
Arthur Lloyd	March	6 Dec 1831	10 Feb 1841		(Note: Colonel, Napoleonic War veteran)
Abraham Nelles	Grimsby	5 January 1832	† 1839		Ceased attendence after 1932 (Note: Land surveyor, Militia officer, Township Council member)
Thomas Alexander Stewart	Peterborough	20 Nov 1833	10 Feb 1841		(Note: Settler, justice of the peace, and mill owner)
William Morris	Perth	22 January 1836	10 Feb 1841		
George Hamilton	Hamilton	23 January 1836	† 20 Feb 1836		
John Macaulay	Kingston	23 January 1836	10 Feb 1841		
Archibald McLean	Cornwall	23 January 1836	10 Feb 1841		(Note: later served as in the Court of Common Pleas 1850–1862, Chief Justice of the Court of Queen's Bench for Upper Canada 1862–1863 and judge of the Court of Error and Appeal 1863–1865; died in Toronto in 1865)
Philip VanKoughnet	Cornwall	23 January 1836	10 Feb 1841		(Note: later chairman of the Canadian Board of Government Arbitrators 1870–1873)
John Simcoe Macaulay	Toronto	9 February 1839	10 Feb 1841		(Note: served on Toronto City Council 1841–1842; retired to England in 1845 and died there in 1855)
Jonas Jones	Toronto	27 Feb 1839	10 Feb 1841		(Note: Barrister and judge (Prescott and Russell, Leeds and Grenville and Stormont, Dundas and Glengarry))
Adam Fergusson	Gore District	27 Feb 1839	10 Feb 1841		
Thomas Radcliff	Adelaide	27 Feb 1839	10 Feb 1841		(Note: Peninsular War veteran and militia officer; later as magistrate and customs collector (died June 1841 before assuming post))
Robert Baldwin Sullivan	Toronto	27 Feb 1839	10 Feb 1841		(Note: Provincial Secretary 1838–1841; Served on Executive Council after union as President of the Council (1841–43 and Provincial Secretary 1848; appointed justice of the Court of Queen's Bench 1848)
Robert Charles Wilkins	Prince Edward	14 March 1839	10 Feb 1841		(Note: Owner of mercantile firm Shuter and Wilkins)
John McDonald	Gananoque	20 March 1839	10 Feb 1841		(Note: later removed for non-attendance in 1848)
Henry Graham	Bathurst District	19 April 1839	Not applicable		Never attended
Isaac Fraser	Ernestown	16 July 1839	10 Feb 1841		(Note: Colonel of the Addington Militia, and justice of the peace)
Peter Boyle de Blaquière	Woodstock	3 Dec 1839	10 Feb 1841		
Alexander Fraser	Eastern District	3 Dec 1839	10 Feb 1841		
John McGillivray	Williamstown	3 Dec 1839	10 Feb 1841		(Note: served as a justice of the peace; died near Williamstown (South Glengarry, Ontario) in 1855)
John Willson	Gore District	3 Dec 1839	10 Feb 1841		(Note: died in Saltfleet Township in 1860)

== Meeting Locations ==
The Legislative Council sat in the same building as the Legislative Assembly of Upper Canada. The journals of the Legislative Council noted that its meeting were held at "the chamber", without specifying the exact location.

The Parliament of Upper Canada convened in the capital of the province, which was located in Newark (today's Niagara-on-the-lake) during the 1st Parliament, and was relocated to the Town of York, later renamed Toronto in 1834, for the remainder twelve parliaments.
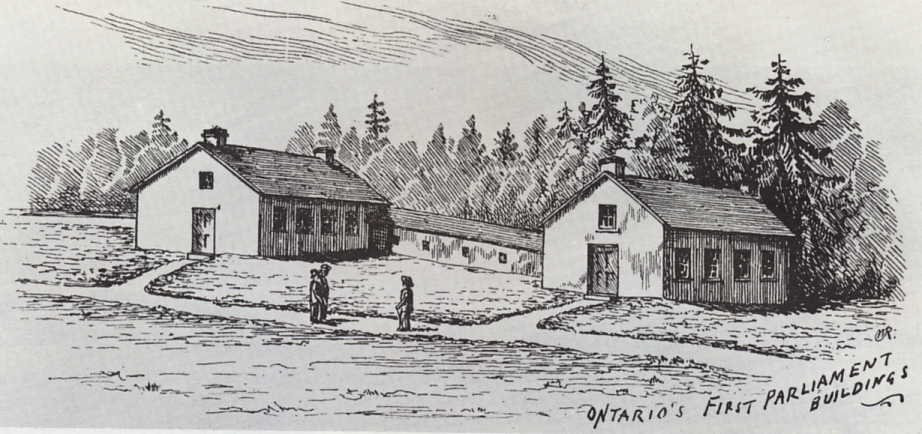
The first Parliament of Ontario (Upper Canada) in Toronto (York) on Front Street at Parliament Street, pre-1812

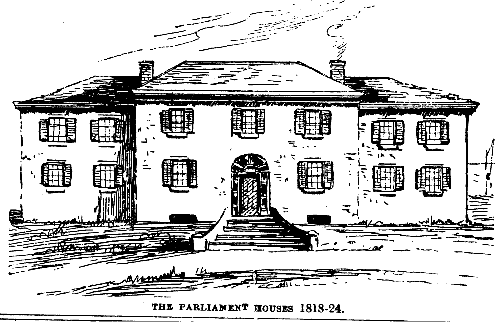
The second Parliament of Ontario (Upper Canada) in Toronto (York), 1818–1824

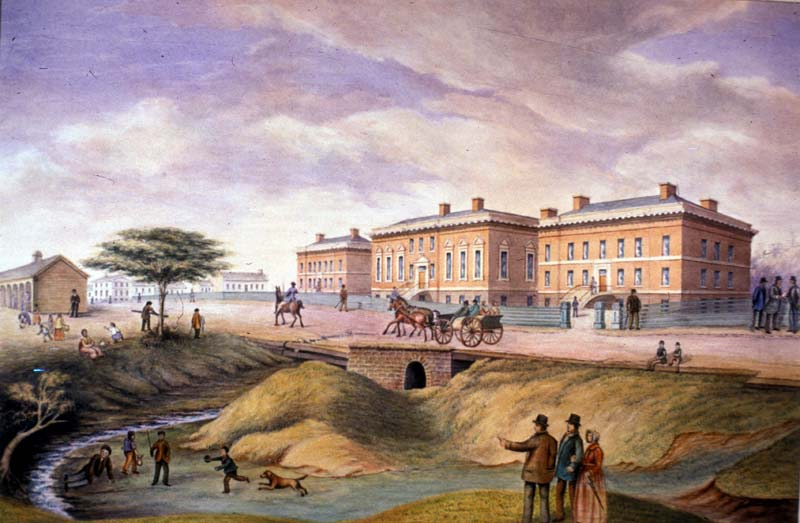
The third Parliament Building in York, 1832, on Front Street between Simcoe and John St.

Various locations were identified as being the site for the Parliament of Upper Canada while the provincial capital was located in Newark (today's Niagara-on-the-lake). Once the capital was moved to the town of York (today's Toronto), location of the assembly were more definitively documented.

Years	Location	Building & notes
1792-1796	Newark (Note: Present day Niagara-on-the-Lake)	Various mentioned, including: the Anchorage; Freemanson's Hall; Navy Hall (Official residence of LG Simcoe)
1796-1813	Town of York (until 1834) Toronto	Palace of Parliament, Front and Parliament Sts. (destroyed on 27 April 1813 by arson by American soldiers)
1814 (once)	Town of York (until 1834) Toronto	Jordan's York Holel, between King and Front Sts. (Note: Present day location of Toronto Sun Building)
1815-1820	Town of York (until 1834) Toronto	The Lawn, Wellington and York Sts. (Personal residence of Chief Justice William Henry Draper)
1820-1824	Town of York (until 1834) Toronto	Upper Canada's Second Parliament Building, Front & Parliament Sts. (Note: Structure located on same plot as Palace of Parliament but further northwest (King and Berkeley)) (Destroyed by accidental fire on 30 December 1824)
1825-1828	Town of York (until 1834) Toronto	The later York General Hospital, King and Hospital (Note: Present day Richmond Street) Sts. (Consequently delay the opening of the hospital)
1829-1832	Town of York (until 1834) Toronto	The former Court House, bordered by King/Church/Court/Toronto Sts. (South of present day location of the Courthouse Square Park)
1832-1840	Town of York (until 1834) Toronto	The later First Ontario Parliament Buildings, bordered by Front/John/Simcoe/Wellington Sts. (Note: Present day location of Metro Hall/CBC Broadcasting Centre) (third parliament building for Upper Canada)

The successor legislature, the Parliament of the Province of Canada, initially convened in Kingston, the capital of the newly united province, at the Alwington House, and would move numerous times in its short lifespan. The capital of the Province of Canada would returned to its former home in Toronto twice, between 1849 and 1851, and again between 1855 and 1859, with Upper Canada's third parliament building, known as the First Ontario Parliament Buildings, hosting its legislature during those periods. Upon Canadian Confederation, the building would house the legislature of the Province of Ontario, the Legislative Assembly of Ontario, until 1892.

== See also ==
- Parliament of Canada
- Legislative Assembly of Upper Canada
- Legislative Council of Lower Canada
- Legislative Assembly of Lower Canada
- Legislative Assembly of the Province of Canada
- Legislative Council of the Province of Canada
- Legislative Assembly of Ontario

== Sources ==
- Constitution Act, 1791. Statutes of the United Kingdom. Vol. 31 George III. 1791. c. 31.
- "Journal and Proceedings of the Legislative Council of Upper Canada (reproduction of sessions 1792–1818)". Report of the Bureau of Archives. 7th. Bureau of Archives, Province of Ontario. 1909.
- "Journal and Proceedings of the Legislative Council of Upper Canada (reproduction of sessions 1821–1824)". Report of the Bureau of Archives. 12th. Bureau of Archives, Province of Ontario. 1915.
- Armstrong, Frederick H. (1985). Handbook of Upper Canadian Chronology. Toronto: Dundurn Press. ISBN 0-919670-92-X.
- Froman, Debra, ed. (1984). Legislators and Legislatures of Ontario: A Reference Guide. Vol. 1. Legislative Library, Legislative Assembly of Ontario.
- "Dictionary of Canadian Biography". Dictionary of Canadian Biography Online. University of Toronto Press and Les Presses de l'Université Laval.
