= Executive Council of Lower Canada =

The Executive Council of Lower Canada was an appointive body created by the Constitutional Act 1791. Its function was to advise the Governor or his representative on the administration of the colony's public affairs. It was replaced by the Executive Council of the Province of Canada in 1841.

== List of Members ==
Member	Start	Stop	Authority
James McGill	November 22, 1793	December 19, 1813	Guy Carleton, 1st Baron Dorchester
William Osgoode	September 19, 1794	1801	Guy Carleton, 1st Baron Dorchester
James Monk	November 29, 1794	June 1820	Guy Carleton, 1st Baron Dorchester
John Lees	December 29, 1794	March 4, 1807	Guy Carleton, 1st Baron Dorchester
Antoine-Louis Juchereau Duchesnay	December 29, 1794	December 15, 1806	Guy Carleton, 1st Baron Dorchester
John Young	December 29, 1794	September 14, 1819	Guy Carleton, 1st Baron Dorchester
Reverend Jacob Mountain Lord bishop of Quebec	November 19, 1795	June 16, 1825	Guy Carleton, 1st Baron Dorchester
Adam Lymburner	September 16, 1791	1799?	Guy Carleton, 1st Baron Dorchester
Jenkin Williams	May 25, 1801	October 30, 1819	Robert Shore Milnes
John Craigie	May 25, 1801	November 26, 1813	Robert Shore Milnes
Pierre-Louis Panet	May 25, 1801	December 2, 1812	Robert Shore Milnes
Chief Justice John Elmsley, Sr.	October 29, 1802	April 29, 1805	Robert Shore Milnes
S. Richardson	November 25, 1805		Thomas Dunn
Chief Justice Henry Allcock	August 12, 1806	February 22, 1808	Thomas Dunn
Justice Jonathan Sewell	September 8, 1808	March 27, 1838	James Henry Craig
James Irvine	August 22, 1809	1822	James Henry Craig
James Kerr	June 26, 1812	November 20, 1831	George Prevost
Ross Cuthbert	June 26, 1812	until 1824, or 1838, or 1841, depending on sources	George Prevost
M. H. Perceval	June 26, 1812	October 12, 1829	George Prevost
John Mure	June 26, 1812	January 17, 1823	George Prevost
Olivier Perrault	June 26, 1812	March 19, 1827	George Prevost
William Bacheler Coltman	July 5, 1815	1825?	George Prevost
William Smith	September 16, 1791	December 6, 1793	John Coape Sherbrooke
Mr. Hale	December 28, 1820	December 24, 1838	George Ramsay, 9th Earl of Dalhousie
Mr. Speaker Louis-Joseph Papineau	December 28, 1820	January 25, 1823	George Ramsay, 9th Earl of Dalhousie
Mr. Secretary John Ready	December 28, 1820	January 29, 1822	George Ramsay, 9th Earl of Dalhousie
Charles J. Stewart, D.D. Bishop	November 22, 1826	July 13, 1837	George Ramsay, 9th Earl of Dalhousie
Charles-Étienne Chaussegros de Léry, esq.	January 4, 1826	October 22, 1835 or in 1837, depending on sources	George Ramsay, 9th Earl of Dalhousie
John Stewart, esq.	January 4, 1826	February 10, 1841	George Ramsay, 9th Earl of Dalhousie
Andrew William Cochran, esq.	May 15, 1827	?	George Ramsay, 9th Earl of Dalhousie
Philippe Panet, esq.	May 26, 1831	November 2, 1838 or February 10, 1841	Matthew Whitworth-Aylmer, 5th Baron Aylmer
Dominique Mondelet, esq.	November 16, 1832	February 10, 1841	Matthew Whitworth-Aylmer, 5th Baron Aylmer
Hughes Heney, esq.	January 28, 1833	February 10, 1841	Matthew Whitworth-Aylmer, 5th Baron Aylmer

== See also ==
- Legislative Council of Lower Canada
- Legislative Assembly of Lower Canada
- National Assembly of Quebec
