= Robert Prescott =

British Army officer and colonial administrator

General Robert Prescott
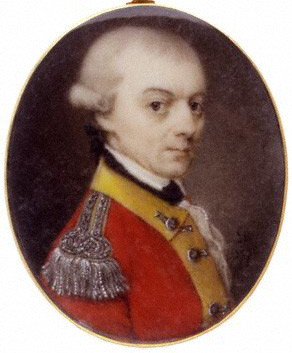
- Portrait by John Bogle, 1776

Governor of Martinique
- In office 1794
- Monarch: George III
- Preceded by: office created
- Succeeded by: John Vaughan

Governor General of the Canadas
- In office 1796–1807
- Monarch: George III
- Preceded by: Guy Carleton
- Succeeded by: James Henry Craig

Personal details
- Born: c. 1726 Lancashire, England
- Died: 21 December 1815 Rose Green, West Sussex, England
- Parent: Richard Prescott (father)

Military service
- Allegiance: Kingdom of Great Britain
- Branch/service: British Army
- Rank: General
- Battles/wars: Seven Years' War; French and Indian War; American Revolutionary War

General Robert Prescott (c. 1726 – 21 December 1815) was a British Army officer and colonial administrator. During a military career which spanned over fifty years, he participated in the Seven Years' War and the American War of Independence, including key engagements such as the Montreal campaign. Prescott subsequently became the Governor of Martinique and then, in 1796, Governor General of the Canadas and Commander-in-Chief, North America. He was recalled to England in 1799 after conflict with the Catholic Church and disputes with Anglo-Canadian elites over land distribution. Prescott continued to hold his position until 1807, with his lieutenant governors acting in his absence. He died in 1815 after unsuccessful attempts to clear his name.

== Early life ==
Modern sources generally agree that Robert Prescott was born in Lancashire in 1726 or 1727. Some sources, such as the Dictionary of Canadian Biography, claim that he was the son of a cavalry officer named Richard Prescott, though the Oxford Dictionary of National Biography says that "on what grounds [this] is not clear." Other sources also suggest that he was the brother of Colonel William Prescott, who fought in some of the same conflicts, although William Prescott was an American who was born in Massachusetts. Older sources differ from modern ones in some respects, with the 1896 Dictionary of National Biography and the 1900 Appletons' Cyclopædia of American Biography both claiming that he was born in 1725; the Dictionary of National Biography further states that "his family lost their estates owing to their opposition to the revolution of 1688."

The Dictionary of Canadian Biography is correct in its claim that General Prescott was the son of Captain Richard Prescott of Major-General Charles Sybourg's Horse, now the 7th Dragoon Guards. In the will of Richard Prescott, of Hanover Street, London, proved in London on 7 April 1747, Captain Richard Prescott lists his five sons - Richard, Robert, Isaac, Arthur and William - and his four daughters - Mary, Sarah, Rebecca, and Elizabeth. When the eldest son, General Richard Prescott, died in 1788, he left legacies to his brother, General Robert Prescott (who was also an executor of his will), to his sisters, Rebecca, Sarah and Elizabeth, and to Robert's daughter, Susanna Dalton.

== Military career ==
Prescott's military career is much more well documented than his early life. He enlisted in the British Army in 1745 and became an ensign in the 15th Regiment of Foot. On 22 January 1755, he reached the rank of captain in the 15th Foot. With the outbreak of the Seven Years' War, Prescott saw action in the 1757 raid on Rochefort, and in 1758, the 15th Foot sailed for North America to participate in the French and Indian War, an ongoing conflict which had become the North American theatre of the Seven Years' War. Prescott was present at the 1758 Siege of Louisbourg. He became an aide-de-camp to General Jeffery Amherst in 1759, participating in the Montreal campaign. Afterward he served under General James Wolfe. He also delivered despatches to England announcing the fall of Fort Lévis in 1760, which was near where the town of Prescott, Ontario would later be founded and named in his honour.

In January 1761, with the Anglo-Cherokee War ongoing, the 95th Regiment of Foot was formed in South Carolina under Ralph Burton. Robert Prescott became a major in the regiment on 22 March. The regiment took the field by May 1761 near Fort Prince George, which guarded the Cherokee Path and had been successfully raided by the Cherokee in the previous year. The regiment was soon sent to the West Indies along with a number of other American regiments to participate in the second invasion of Martinique, which followed an unsuccessful attempt in 1759. Prescott became lieutenant-colonel of the 72nd Regiment of Foot in November 1762, but the regiment disbanded the following year.

Prescott reappears in the military record with the outbreak of the American War of Independence in 1775. With the situation in the American colonies worsening for the British government, a number of units were mustered to be sent there. On 8 September 1775, he became lieutenant-colonel of the 28th Regiment of Foot, which had participated in the Montreal campaign during the French and Indian War. The regiment was sent to North America in May 1776. Later that year, in August, Prescott was present at the Battle of Long Island, after which the British captured New York City and Long Island from the Patriot forces. He also participated in several engagements in Westchester County, followed by the Battle of Fort Washington in November. He became a brevet-colonel on 29 August 1777. He was attached to the British expedition against Philadelphia, and two weeks later, on 11 September, he was present at the Battle of Brandywine, which was followed by the city's capture by the British.

== Administrative career and death ==
Prescott then served in the West Indies and became Governor of Martinique in 1794. In 1796, he became governor-in-chief of the Canadas, New Brunswick and Nova Scotia, as well as Commander-in-Chief, North America. In his new position, he pursued a programme of improvements to military fortifications and infrastructure, which he found to be dilapidated and unsuitable for defense against external enemies, but was hampered by financial constraints. An attempt by colonial officials in Lower Canada to use corvée labour for a road improvement scheme led to widespread rioting, and the resulting unstable political situation in Canada over the winter of 1796–97 created what historian F. Murray Greenwood characterizes as a "garrison mentality" amongst Anglo-Canadian elites.

The possibility of an insurrection by French Canadians, which greatly outnumbered Anglo-Canadians, alarmed Prescott considerably. In an October 1796 letter to Home Secretary Lord Portland, he wrote that "His Majesty's English subjects here compared to the [French Canadians] are not in a greater proportion as Seventy to Two Thousand." Leading Anglo-Canadian elites such as Chief Justice William Osgoode and Attorney General Jonathan Sewell believed the riots over the road scheme were orchestrated by French ambassador to the U.S. Michel Ange Bernard Mangourit, and "Prescott spent an uneasy winter fearing that the prevalence of secret meetings and inflammatory proclamations presaged a seditious conspiracy".

In an atmosphere of panic and conspiracy, Prescott cracked down against perceived insurrectionists, resulting in the trial and execution of American merchant David McLane as a French spy. He also banned the immigration of Catholic priests from France, and placed the Catholic Church in Canada under strict surveillance, arguing that the colonial government should confiscate the estates held by the Sulpician order. However, his reluctance to directly violate the rights of Catholics led to conflict with the Anglican Bishop of Quebec, Jacob Mountain, who singlemindedly pursued Anglican supremacy over the Catholic Church.

Prescott was also faced with a refugee crisis, as many United Empire Loyalists and others who had fled United States to settle in Canada had still not received legal title to any lands, and had either returned to the US or began squatting on Canadian land instead. With responsibility for addressing the crisis falling to him as governor, Prescott devised a scheme designed to distinguish genuine settlers from land speculators by basing the size of township grants on the expenses incurred by the applicant, which also served to reward those who had begun to develop lands in anticipation of receiving a land title. This satisfied the majority of applicants, but angered speculators, as it limited their ability to profit from merely holding title to lands in Canada. Prescott began to suspect a conspiracy dating back to at least 1794 amongst members of the Executive Council, including Osgoode, Hugh Finlay (chairman of the land committee) and John Young, to exploit their official positions to acquire large tracts of land for themselves.

The Executive Council condemned Prescott's attempted solution to the land issue, leading him to believe that his suspicions had been confirmed. A military figure who was unaccustomed to politicking and perceived insubordination, Prescott lashed out against councillors, openly accusing them of land speculation and jobbery. In April 1799, attempts at reconciliation failed, and the British government recalled Prescott to England, despatching Sir Robert Milnes, 1st Baronet as lieutenant governor to manage Lower Canada in his absence. Milnes promptly granted the Executive Council the land grants they had pursued. After his return to England, Prescott endeavoured for some time to have an official inquiry made into his recall in order to exonerate himself. He officially remained in his position until 1807, but never returned to Lower Canada. He died on 21 December 1815 at Rose Green, West Sussex, aged about 89.

== Marriage and Family ==
On 18 January 1765, at All Saints' Church, Wakefield, Prescott married Susanna (d. April 1817, aged 73), daughter of William Serjeantson, of Kirkgate, Wakefield and Hanlith, Kirkby Malham, Yorkshire. They had two daughters and a son,

- Susanna (1766-1823), married at St Mary-le-bone, London, 10 March 1783, Lt. Col. John Dalton, 4th Light Dragoons, of Sleningford Hall, Ripon & had issue. Their granddaughter, Susanna Dalbiac, married James Innes-Ker, 6th Duke of Roxburghe, and was a Lady of the Bedchamber to Queen Victoria for thirty years.
- Rebecca (1768-1798) married in Quebec Lt. Col. John Baldwin, The 4th (King's Own) Regiment of Foot, A.D.C. to General Prescott, and had issue.
- Serjeantson (1784-1816), Lt. Col. 5th Dragoon Guards, m. in Battle, Sussex, 20 December 1808, Mary Falkiner, daughter of Caleb Falkiner, and granddaughter of Sir Riggs Falkiner, 1st Bt., of Cork, Ireland. He was killed by a cricket ball at Rose Green, Sussex, leaving issue.

== Legacy ==
Prescott, Ontario and Prescott County are named in his honour.

== See also ==
- List of governors general of Canada
- List of lieutenant governors of Quebec

Government offices
Preceded by The Lord Dorchester	Governor General of the Canadas; 1796–1807	Succeeded by Sir James Henry Craig
