= Jonathan Sewell =

Lower Canada lawyer, politician, and judge

Jonathan Sewell LL.D., h.c. (Harvard)
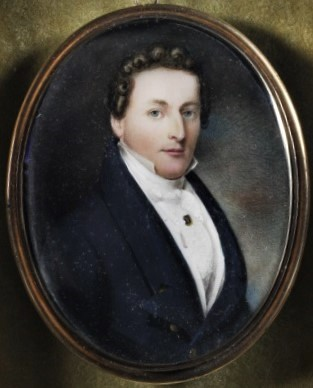

Chief Justice of Lower Canada
- In office 1808–1838
- Preceded by: Henry Allcock
- Succeeded by: Sir James Stuart

Solicitor General of Lower Canada and Inspector of the King's Domain
- In office 1793–1795

Attorney General and Counsel General of Lower Canada
- In office 1795–1808
- Preceded by: James Monk
- Succeeded by: Edward Bowen

Member of the Legislative Assembly of Lower Canada for William-Henry (four elections)
- In office 1796–1808
- Preceded by: John Barnes
- Succeeded by: Edward Bowen

Member of the Legislative Council of Lower Canada
- In office 1808–1838

Speaker of the Legislative Council
- In office 1809–1838
- Preceded by: Henry Allcock
- Succeeded by: None; position abolished on suspension of the constitution

Member of the Executive Council of Lower Canada
- In office 1808–1830
- In office June 1838–November 1838

Personal details
- Born: Jonathan Sewall; June 6, 1766 Cambridge, Massachusetts, British America
- Died: November 11, 1839 (aged 73) Quebec City, Province of Lower Canada
- Resting place: Cathedral of the Holy Trinity, Quebec City
- Spouse: Henrietta Smith (called Harriet)
- Children: 16 (4 died during infancy) (10 alive at his death, plus 2 orphaned grandchildren in will)
- Parent: Jonathan Sewall (father)
- Education: Brasenose College, Oxford
- Profession: Lawyer, judge

Jonathan Sewell (born Jonathan Sewall; June 6, 1766 – November 11, 1839) was a lawyer, judge, defensive spymaster, and political figure in Lower Canada. Sewell utilized the idea of substantive law (shaping how people should act through distilling punishment) over procedural law (outright punishing the guilty for what was committed) as much as possible when it came to delegating punishment for criminal cases specifically; Sewell saw the certainty of punishment over the seriousness of punishment as enough to alter the intentions of non-violent or non-hardened criminals. In civil suits, Sewell "likely did more than anyone to professionalize the administration of civil justice (in Lower Canada and Montreal) prior to the codification of civil laws in 1866."

Before being highly successful in politics, Sewell proved to be an extremely adept law student, performed as a violinist, and an orchestral composer, who once was selectively placed in "the lead position of an amateur orchestra" by the first member of the British royal family to live in British North America during any term longer than a visit (1791-1800), Prince Edward, Duke of Kent and Strathearn (at the time known as Prince Edward Augustus).

Sewell had attempted to influence the French-Canadian population in Montreal and Quebec (at the time Montreal and the colony of Lower Canada) in the early 1800s through both a failed attack on the legitimacy of the Roman Catholic Church in the colony, and through control of the educational system the colonial government was responsible with delegating. The latter could be argued as successful as the institution created under the "mind control to Anglicize" guidelines later became McGill University, but the parameters of Canadian and Quebec education changed with the ever-mutable nature of the colonial (the colony would become "united" multiple times with the rest of the British North American colonies and change systems of government until 1867) and federal education guidelines and government recommendations.

It is noted that Sewell's "extreme faith" in his attendance and due to his varying roles within his life caused him to be "easily the most powerful official (in Lower Canada and Montreal) under the Governor in the colony."

Sewell believed that the colony of Lower Canada was in danger of being "lost to England and the Crown" around the early 1800s. Sewell was retained by the Governor of Lower Canada at the time (Sir Craig) to "analyze the political ills of the colony." Sewell believed and mentioned in this report that "the great links of connection between a Government and its subjects are religious, Laws and Language," and he was under the impression that "those links did not exist in the colony." Sewell claimed that the British and the Canadians (used to refer generally to people of British and/or French descent at this time) nurtured a "national antipathy" and that because "no incorporation of two such Extremes (as British and French mannerisms) can ever be effected." Sewell concluded that "the province (of Lower Canada) must be converted to an English Colony, or, it will ultimately be lost to England." Finally, Sewell spoke on why he thought these political ills arose in the colony in the first place: 1) "From the French predilections in the great Mass of the Inhabitants" (a fancy way of saying "to prefer the political traditions that many of the French colonists have within them for political rioting and revolution over loyalism) and 2) "From want of Influence and power in the Executive Government." This is also why Sewell sought out to control institutions that would influence the French population of Lower Canada at the time like the Roman Catholic Church and (when that failed) the education system through the Royal Institution for the Advancement of Learning (later McGill University) to increase the colonial anglicization of the colony.

== Early life ==
He was born in Cambridge, Massachusetts, the son of Jonathan Sewall, the last British attorney general of Massachusetts and Esther Quincy. After a group of patriots attacked the family's residence, the Sewalls moved to Bristol, England; they adopted the spelling Sewell for the family name at this time. He attended Brasenose College, Oxford and then went to New Brunswick in 1785, where he studied law with Ward Chipman. He was named registrar of the Vice Admiralty Court for New Brunswick in 1787. In 1788, he was called to the bar and set up practice.

From 1799-1800 Sewell had conducted updated verses for "God Save the King" which caused somewhat of a sensation in 1800 when they were sung on stage in London by actor Richard Brinsley Butler Sheridan, after an assassination attempt on King George III.

== Career ==
In 1789, he moved to Quebec City from New Brunswick and qualified as a lawyer there. In 1790, he served as interim attorney general for the province, which after went to James Monk. In 1793, Sewell was named solicitor general and inspector of the king's domain and, in 1795, he became attorney general and advocate general in Lower Canada. In 1796, he was appointed judge in the Vice-Admiralty Court at Quebec. On September 24 that same year, he married Henrietta, daughter of chief justice William Smith. He was elected to the Legislative Assembly of Lower Canada for William-Henry (later Sorel) in 1796. In the house, he was often called on to draft bills, but with regard to government business, he normally played a role secondary to that of leaders of the English party such as John Young and Pierre-Amable de Bonne. He supported the party, except on two controversial issues — the financing of prisons in 1805 and the expulsion of Ezekiel Hart, a Jew — in which his legal opinions obliged him to break rank. He remained in the assembly until 1808.

Some time within 1796-1797, Sewell established an intelligence network within Lower Canada (alongside others like Montreal magistrate and merchant John Richardson) that "would function for more than a decade with relative effectiveness".

Sewell helped introduce the Better Preservation Act of 1797, which allowed the suspension of habeas corpus in cases of suspected treason. In 1797, he prosecuted David McLane for treason, who was executed. He prepared legislation which led to the establishment of the Royal Institution for the Advancement of Learning (later McGill College) in 1801, in an attempt to gain "control over the population" after a failed attempt to do it through the Roman Catholic Church.

In the early 1800s, Sewell crossed "his opinions based in law and his opinions based in (government) policy preference" with legal cases involving the Church of England (the Anglican Church), which was not something that he normally liked to do, as he "considered that the Church of England in the colony lacked in law certain rights essential to its functioning (such as the legal existence of parishes), but Sewell still believed it to be an established church (aka state religion) and took on cases for them. However, when it came to a religion that Sewell was not directly involved with legally or personally (such as the Roman Catholic Church in this case), Sewell "asserted that (government) policy dictated the exercise of a royal supremacy (that Sewell) believed was sanctioned in law, and (Sewell) argued that a supposed lack of legal recognition of the (Roman Catholic) church by British law should be exploited to oblige it to accept royal supremacy." That is evidence of both crossing opinions and hypocrisy on the part of Sewell, as "by 1801 Sewell had come to fear 'with too much certainty' that it (royal supremacy for the Roman Catholic church) had, in fact, been established by the Quebec Act of 1774."

Additionally, Sewell attempted to infiltrate the Roman Catholic Church with centralized employees and leaders loyal to the Executive Council to control their "ignorant" and "superstitious" followers. Sewell expressed to Colonial Administrator, Lieutenant Governor Sir Robert Shore Milnes that "given the independence of the church and the ignorance and superstition of the population, the influence exerted over the inhabitants by the clergy and the bishop was (both) immense and highly dangerous (in opposing the government's will)". Sewell also commented that “to direct [the bishop - a man name Denaut] is to direct all,” and that "since the root of the executive (council)’s problems in the colony was (Sewell felt) a lack of sway over the people, (Sewell commented to Milnes the opinion) that the method to the control of the church was the best means to obtain it (the sway of the people)." Finally, Sewell threw in his legal opinion for how they could accomplish this without upset or alarm on behalf of the people recognizing this infiltration as he stated that the "right of nominating the Bishop, the Coadjutor and the Parish priest which (the British government) assumed by the conquest of Canada but has never yet exercised." Later, in 1805, (Head Bishop) Denaut decided to petition the king for legal recognition of his office in the form of letters patent under conditions to be determined by the crown - Sewell saw that as "a tactical victory." However, Sewell was ultimately not successful in that goal as the Bishop died in 1806, and Sewell was not able to stop the Colonial Administrator Thomas Dunn from appointing a man not under Sewell's control (Plessis) as Bishop until after the deceased Bishop's petition for legal recognition from the King of England was decided upon.

When that scheme for control over the population failed, Sewell provided a back up plan that "executive influence over the Canadian population could also be obtained through control of education." Therefore, Sewell (along with Jacob Mountain and Sir Milnes) "worked out the details of a scheme for government-financed and -directed elementary schools in the countryside staffed by loyal Canadian teachers who would instruct habitant children in the English language and the blessings of British rule." Sewell would be the one to draft the legislative bill for this plan which "amended by the assembly to impotence with respect to the education of Canadians, established the Royal Institution for the Advancement of Learning" in 1801 - this Royal Institution later became McGill University.

In 1808, he was named Chief Justice for Lower Canada and became a member of the Executive Council of Lower Canada. Later in 1808, he was appointed to the Legislative Council and was named speaker in 1809. Sewell supported a union of Upper and Lower Canada. However, in 1822, he opposed a legislative union because of the strong opposition in the province. In 1809, he published rules of practice for the Quebec Court of King's Bench and the Court of Appeals; James Monk published similar rules at Montreal, Lower Canada.

In 1814, the Legislative Assembly voted to impeach Sewell and Monk on the grounds that some of their rules of practice were actually legislation, the responsibility of the legislature. Sewell successfully defended himself against the charges in London. On the bench, he endorsed the use of civil law based on French traditions and criminal law modelled after English norms. Sewell resigned from the Executive Council in 1830 after the assembly requested that judges to be excluded from serving on the council. He resigned from his position of chief justice in 1838 for ill health.

Sewell was elected as a member of the American Philosophical Society in 1830.

He died on November 11, 1839, in Quebec City. His residence, at 87 Saint-Louis Street, Quebec City, was designated a National Historic Site of Canada in 1969.

When it came to criminal cases in law, Sewell was much more attracted to the "British Enlightenment arguments of Sir William Blackstone" over the "theological school of selective terror of William Paley." Sewell, more often than not, would strive to lower the severity of legal punishment if the person involved was penitent (sorrowful), the death penalty was involved, or imprisonment with hardened criminals were relevant. His criminal sentences were designed to prevent crime rather than punish the guilty, and he felt that it was the certainty, not the severity, of punishment that deterred crime."

Sewell more than once had "stretched the evidence so as to invite acquittal for non-violent property crimes carrying the death sentence, and in some cases, including convictions for murder, he intervened to save a prisoner from the gallows." Furthermore, until the very end of Sewell's life, he would "persist in efforts to lessen recourse to the death penalty through reduction in the number of crimes punishable by death and through transportation of felons", but more often than not these attempts would be "thwarted by the indifference of the (House of) assembly and the Colonial Administrator."

When it came to civil suits, however, Sewell tended to favour the Crown, especially if government political interests were involved. He called those cases "a pleasure" to do. However, if Sewell's work was biased towards the Crown, it was still done expertly and with elegance, being notably "remarkable for their clarity of expression, their search for general principle, and the depth of scholarship that underpins them."

Sewell was magnificent with civil suits by "probably doing more than anyone to professionalize the administration of civil justice prior to codification of civil law in 1866."

== Personal life ==
Sewell also led an amateur orchestra and performed violin in a quartet at Quebec City and opened the Theatre Royal there in 1832. He helped found the Literary and Historical Society of Quebec and served as its president from 1830 to 1831. Sewell was also a member of the Barons' Club and an active shareholder in the Union Company of Quebec (who built the Union Hotel as "a focal point of social life at Quebec)."

Some time in the 1820s "for many years", Sewell presided over the Quebec branch of the British and Foreign Bible Society, and was a leading member within the Cathedral of the Holy Trinity. Sewell had offered to build a new chapel in 1824 as the cathedral was "too small" on the condition that he and his heirs could name the incumbent. Bishop Jacob Mountain accepter the offer and Sewell named his son Edmund Willoughby as incumbent. Sewell then purchased a lot on Rue Saint-Stanislas and constructed a building there based on a model of Ranelagh Chapel in London, called Holy Trinity Chapel. Sewell spent more than 3500 Pound Sterling on the building and it opened in November of 1825. The new chapel held 800. Governor Dalhousie called the chapel "neat" but called Willoughby "unfit and unqualified."

In December 1808, Sewell "assumed the patronage of a literary society formed by (one of his former pupils) Philippe-Joseph Aubert de Gaspe plus other young men of Quebec."

Sewell promoted the theatre and tried to get the Catholic Bishop in Lower Canada, Joseph-Octave Plessis, to repeal the prohibition on theatre for Catholics - Sewell's efforts were not successful and could possibly have been an attempt at anglicizing the French Canadian population because of his previous attempts to control the Catholic Church in Canada by attacking its legitimacy in legislature.

In October 1818, Sewell was appointed to the board of the Royal Institution (of the Advancement of Learning, later McGill University) and headed a meeting of the managers of the Quebec Dispensary.

In 1819, Sewell donated "a fine imported cow and her bull calf" to the Agriculture Society, as it is noted that Sewell was "long a subscriber" to the society.

His brother Stephen was a member of the Legislative Assembly and served as solicitor general for Lower Canada.

Sewell and his wife had 16 children, 12 surviving past infancy, and he, by all accounts, was a fair father and good husband: "Sewell was a highly attentive father; on one occasion, for example, he protested angrily when a son in school received corporal punishment, a means of discipline he abhorred" and "the marriage (of Sewell and his wife Henrietta) was born out of love and would be lived in love."

Sewell preferred the high-society life in Quebec more than that of Montreal and found the high-society life of the latter "scandalous and frivolous" and "particularly deplored the coldness shown to their wives by Montreal's businessmen, with their male clubs, companies, & coffee houses."

Sewell was responsible with "helping to introduce Palladian architecture into Quebec, then popular in Britain and the U.S." when he moved his family into a mansion of that style located inside the Porte Saint-Louis (aka the Saint-Louis Gate, an entrance in the fortified walls of Old Quebec) in 1805.

Sewell was in favour of political unity between Lower Canada and Upper Canada and the other (established eastern) colonies of British North America, as he argued that concept to both Sir James Henry Craig and to Prince Edward Augustus, the Duke of Kent. That was first argued (to Craig) at further anglicizeing Lower Canada to "secure the colony for England" and later (to Prince Edward Augustus during the War of 1812) to protect British and Canadian interests against American expansionism in what is modern Canada. The plan would later apparently be published in 1814 under the name A plan for the federal union of British provinces in North America. The plan included concepts like a strong central government, with each province having its own subsequent representatives to the crown as the head of the state, but the plan was amended to include further provincial legislatures themselves, as would be the operation in modern Canada of provincial and municipal levels of government with their own levels of jurisdiction that cannot be infringed upon by the other municipalities, provinces, or federal government if applicable. More often than not, the provinces work together to "cut out the middle man" and keep everything within their jurisdiction.

Sewell believed, following the orthodoxy of the time, that "any fundamentally dishonest or immoral act was a misdemeanor, even though not covered by law," and that serious crime was "on the rise" in Canada due to those acts, and to places like coffeehouses, taverns, gambling dens, and brothels.

Sewell was on time and present at work a large amount of the time that he was expected to be as a government official as "from 1809 to 1823 he was present on 90 per cent of all court days during which he was in the colony."

In Paris, France, he purchased 600 volumes of French Law for the Advocates' Library at Quebec.

On Sewell's death, there were some 1,476 books in his personal library; 1,120 were on law, politics, or public administration.

== Works ==
- An abstract from precedents of proceedings in the British House of Commons (1792)
- Orders and rules of practice in the Court of King's Bench for the district of Quebec Lower Canada (1809)
- A plan for the federal union of British provinces in North America (1814)
- For Mrs Sewell My own dear Jewell
- An Orderly Room
- An Essay on the juridical history of France so far as it relates to the law of the province of Lower Canada... (1824)
- Plan for a general legislative union of the British provinces in North America (1824, with J. B. Robinson)

== Honours ==
- LL.D. (honoris causa), Harvard (1823)
- Election to the American Philosophical Society (1830)
- Member of the Massachusetts Historical Society (1839)

== Bibliography ==
- "Biography". Dictionnaire des parlementaires du Québec de 1792 à nos jours (in French). National Assembly of Quebec.
