= Monkland =

Monkland may refer to:

- Monkland, Herefordshire, a small village in Herefordshire, England
- Monkland, Ontario, Canada, a hamlet in North Stormont
- Monkland, Queensland, a suburb of Gympie, Queensland, Australia
- Monkland Village, a neighbourhood in the Montreal borough of Côte-des-Neiges–Notre-Dame-de-Grâce

== See also ==
- 103 Monkland, a bus route in Montreal, Quebec, Canada
- Monkland and Kirkintilloch Railway, an early mineral railway running from a colliery at Monklands to the Forth and Clyde Canal at Kirkintilloch, Scotland
- Monkland Avenue (disambiguation)
- Monkland Canal unnavigable, partly culverted
- Monkland Priory, a priory in Monkland, Herefordshire, England
- Monkland Railways, formed by the merger of the Ballochney Railway, the Monkland and Kirkintilloch Railway and the Slamannan Railway
- Monklands (disambiguation)
