= Legislative Council of Lower Canada =

Former Canadian upper house of government

Legislative Council of Lower Canada Conseil législatif du Bas-Canada

Type
- Type: Upper house of the Parliament of Lower Canada

History
- Founded: 1791
- Disbanded: 1838
- Preceded by: Council for the Affairs of the Province of Quebec
- Succeeded by: Legislative Council of the Province of Canada (following the temporary Special Council of Lower Canada)

The Legislative Council of Lower Canada was the upper house of the Parliament of Lower Canada from 1792 until 1838. The Legislative Council consisted of appointed councillors who voted on bills passed up by the Legislative Assembly of Lower Canada. The legislative council was created by the Constitutional Act. Many of the members first called in the Council in 1792 had served as councillors in the Council for the Affairs of the Province of Quebec.

The council came to be dominated by the Château Clique, members of the province's most powerful families who were generally interested in preserving the status quo. Both the upper and lower houses were dissolved on March 27, 1838 following the Lower Canada Rebellion and Lower Canada was administered by an appointed Special Council.

Following the Act of Union in 1840, the Legislative Council of the Province of Canada was created in 1841.

== Legislative buildings ==
- Old Parliament Building (Quebec)

== List of Members of the Legislative Council ==
Member	Appointed to the Chamber	End of Term
Adam Mabane	1792	1792 (January 3)
François-Marie Picoté de Belestre	1792	1792 (March 30)
William Smith (Speaker 1791-1793)	1792	1793 (December 6)
Edward Harrison	1792	1794 (October 15)
John Collins	1792	1795 (April 15)
John Fraser	1792	1795 (December 5)
Gaspard-Joseph Chaussegros de Léry	1792	1797 (December 11)
Hugh Finlay	1792	1801 (December 26)
Joseph-Dominique-Emmanuel Le Moyne de Longueuil	1792	1807 (January 19)
Charles-Louis Tarieu de Lanaudière	1792	1811 (October 2)
René-Amable Boucher de Boucherville	1792	1812 (August 31)
Paul-Roch de Saint-Ours	1792	1814 (August 11)
Thomas Dunn (Speaker 1797-1801; 1805; 1808; 1811-1815?)	1792	1818 (April 15)
François Baby (Speaker 1806)	1792	1820 (October 6)
George Pownall	1792	1834 (October 17)
Henry Caldwell	1793 (February 5)	1810 (May 28)
Jacob Mountain	1793 (July 7)	1825 (June 16)
William Osgoode (Speaker 1794-1797)	1795 (January 5)	1824 (January 17)
James Monk (Speaker 1802; 1815-1816)	1795 (January 5)	1820 (June )
John Johnson	1796	1830 (January 4)
Michel-Eustache-Gaspard-Alain Chartier de Lotbinière	1796	1822 (January 1)
Gabriel-Elzéar Taschereau	1798	1809 (September 18)
Jenkin Williams	1803 (February 8)	1819 (October 30)
John Elmsley (Speaker 1803-1804)	1803 (February 8)	1805 (April 29)
Henry Allcock (Speaker 1807-1808)	1807 (January 21)	1808 (February 22)
Jonathan Sewell (Speaker 1809-1810; 1817; 1819-1826; 1829-1830; 1833-1838)	1808	1838 (March 27)
Charles de Saint-Ours	1808 (December 2)	1834 (November 11)
John Hale (Speaker 1818; 1831)	1808 (December 3)	1838 (March 27)
Antoine-Louis Juchereau Duchesnay	1810 (December 12)	1825 (February 17)
Sir John Caldwell (Speaker 1831-1833?)	1811 (December 15)	1838 (March 27)
Herman Witsius Ryland	1811 (December 17)	1838 (March 27)
James Cuthbert	1811 (December 18)	1838 (March 27)
Charles-Gaspard Tarieu de Lanaudière	1811 (December 19)	1812 (June 7)
Charles William Grant	1811 (December 21)	1838 (March 27)
Pierre-Ignace Aubert de Gaspé	1812	1823 (February 13)
Jacques-Nicolas Perrault	1812 (January)	1812 (August 7)
John Blackwood	1813 (April 9)	1819 (June 24)
Pierre-Dominique Debartzch	1814 (January 17)	1838 (March 27)
William McGillivray	1814 (January 19)	1825 (October 16)
Jean-Antoine Panet	1815 (January)	1815 (May 17)
John Richardson	1816 (January 24)	1831 (May 18)
Joseph-Octave Plessis	1817 (April 30)	1825 (December 4)
Roderick Mackenzie of Terrebonne	1817 (May 10)	1838 (March 27)
Ignace-Michel-Louis-Antoine d'Irumberry de Salaberry	1817 (December 4)	1828 (March 22)
William Burns	1818 (January 2)	1829 (September 25)
Michael Henry Perceval	1818 (January 10)	1829 (October 12)
Olivier Perrault	1818 (January 28)	1827 (March 19)
Thomas-Pierre-Joseph Taschereau	1818 (January 28)	1826 (October 8)
William Scott	1818 (January 29)	1820 (January 11)
Louis-René Chaussegros de Léry	1818 (February 9)	1832 (November 28)
James Irvine	1818 (February 20)	1829 (September 20)
Louis Turgeon	1818 (March 10)	1827 (September 26)
Louis Gugy	1818 (April 10)	1838 (March 27)
Charles-Michel d'Irumberry de Salaberry	1818 (December 14)	1829 (February 27)
James Kerr (Speaker 1827-1828)	1821 (October 19)	1838 (March 27)
William Bowman Felton	1822 (April 6)	1837 (June 30)
Mathew Bell	1823 (April 30)	1838 (March 27)
Edward Bowen	1824 (February 27)	1838 (March 27)
Toussaint Pothier	1824 (July 22)	1838 (March 27)
John Stewart	1825 (May 13)	1838 (March 27)
John Forsyth	1827 (July 3)	1837 (December 27)
Charles James Stewart	1828 (January)	1837 (July 13)
Jean-Thomas Taschereau	1828 (May 2)	1832 (June 14)
Samuel Hatt	1829 (November 29)	1838 (March 27)
Denis-Benjamin Viger	1829 (November 30)	1838 (March 27)
Louis Guy	1830 (December 20)	1838 (March 27)
George Moffatt	1830 (December 24)	1838 (March 27)
Jacques-Philippe Saveuse de Beaujeu	1831 (November 25)	1832 (June 19)
François-Roch de Saint-Ours	1832 (January 1)	1838 (March 27)
Peter McGill	1832 (January 3)	1838 (March 27)
John Molson	1832 (January 4)	1836 (January 11)
Marc-Pascal de Sales Laterrière	1832 (January 5)	1838 (March 27)
François-Xavier Malhiot	1832 (January 6)	1838 (March 27)
Jean Dessaulles	1832 (January 7)	1835 (June 20)
Barthélemy Joliette	1832 (January 8)	1838 (March 27)
Pierre de Rastel de Rocheblave	1832 (January 9)	1838 (March 27)
Robert Unwin Harwood	1832 (January 10)	1838 (March 27)
Antoine-Gaspard Couillard	1832 (January 11)	1838 (March 27)
Jean-Baptiste Juchereau Duchesnay	1832 (April 4)	1833 (January 13)
James Baxter	1832 (August)	1837 (November 18)
Horatio Gates	1832 (August 1)	1834 (April 11)
Robert Jones	1832 (August 2)	1838 (March 27)
François Quirouet	1833 (October 25)	1838 (March 27)
Joseph Masson	1834 (October 16)	1838 (March 27)
Amable Dionne	1837 (August 22)	1838 (March 27)
René-Édouard Caron	1837 (August 22)	1838 (March 27)
Janvier-Domptail Lacroix	1837 (August 22)	1838 (March 27)
Clément-Charles Sabrevois de Bleury	1837 (August 22)	1838 (March 27)
Gabriel Marchand	1837 (August 22)	
John Neilson	1837 (August 22)	1838 (March 27)
John Pangman	1837 (August 22)	1838 (March 27)
Melchior-Alphonse de Salaberry	1837 (August 22)	1838 (March 27)
Jean-Baptiste-René Hertel de Rouville	1837 (August 22)	1838 (March 27)
John Malcolm Fraser	1837 (August 22)	1838 (March 27)

== Speakers ==
During much of the existence of the Legislative Council, the Chief Justice served as Speaker and others appointed to the role in absence of the Chief Justice.

- William Smith 1791-1793
- William Osgoode 1794-1797
- Thomas Dunn 1797-1801
- James Monk 1802
- John Elmsley 1803-1804
- Thomas Dunn 1805
- François Baby 1806
- Henry Allcock 1807-1808
- Thomas Dunn 1808
- Jonathan Sewell 1809-1810
- Thomas Dunn 1811-?
- James Monk 1815-1816
- Jonathan Sewell 1817
- John Hale 1818
- Jonathan Sewell 1819-1826
- James Kerr 1827-1828
- Jonathan Sewell 1829-1830
- John Hale 1831
- Sir John Caldwell 1831-?
- Jonathan Sewell 1833-1838

After the Rebellion, the Speaker was a member of the Special Council of Lower Canada:

- James Cuthbert, Jr. 1838
- Sir James Stuart, 1st Baronet 1839-1841

== See also ==
- Executive Council of Lower Canada
- Constitutional history of Canada
- Legislative Council of Quebec

== Notes ==
Unless otherwise noted, the member died in office.
