= John Elmsley =

The Hon. John Elmsley
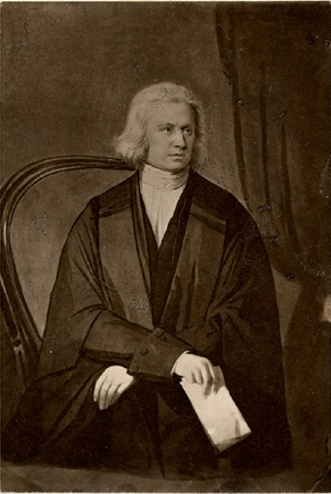

Chief Justice of Upper Canada
- In office 1796–1802
- Preceded by: William Osgoode
- Succeeded by: Henry Allcock

Chief Justice of Lower Canada
- In office 1802–1805
- Preceded by: William Osgoode

Personal details
- Born: 1762 London, Kingdom of Great Britain
- Died: (April 29) 1805 (aged 40–41) Montreal, Lower Canada
- Education: Oriel College, Oxford
- Occupation: colonial jurist / administrator
- Profession: lawyer
- Cabinet: Peter Russell; Peter Hunter; Sir Robert Milnes, 1st Baronet

John Elmsley (1762 – April 29, 1805) was Chief Justice of Upper Canada and afterwards of Lower Canada. In both of the Canadas he served as President of the Executive Council and Speaker of the Legislative Council. During the Hunter administration, he was the most powerful man in Upper Canada. In Lower Canada, from 1802 until his death he was second only in rank to the Lieutenant Governor.

== Early life in England ==
In 1762, he was born in England at Marylebone, London. He was the first son of Alexander and Anne (Elligood) Elmsley. He was educated at Oriel College, Oxford, graduating BA in 1786, MA in 1789, and entering the Inner Temple in 1790.

At London in July, 1796, he married Mary Hallowell, daughter of Captain Benjamin Hallowell III (1723-1799) R.N., of Roxbury, Boston, by his wife Mary, daughter of Thomas Boylston. Together they had at least one son, John Jr, who later followed him into the Executive Council of Upper Canada. Mrs Elmsley's Loyalist father was His Majesty's Commissioner of Customs for the Port of Boston at the time of the Boston Tea Party, which led the excited revolutionaries to persecute and expel the family from Boston, on pain of death. Mrs Elmsley was a niece of Governor Moses Gill and her brothers included Admiral Sir Benjamin Hallowell-Carew, one of Nelson's Band of Brothers, and Ward Hallowell (better known as Ward Nicholas Boylston), the great benefactor of Harvard University. Her mother was a first cousin of Susanna Boylston, the mother of the 2nd President of the United States, John Adams, and grandmother of the 6th President, John Quincy Adams.

== Upper Canada ==
In November 1796, Elmsley arrived in Newark, soon followed by his wife and father-in-law. Lieutenant-Governor John Graves Simcoe had left the province in July, choosing Peter Russell to act as administrator in his absence. Before he left Simcoe had ordered that the provincial capital be moved from Niagara to York (Toronto), and Russell was busy organising the unwelcome upheaval. For legal reasons, Elmsley objected strongly to the move which brought him into conflict with Russell throughout 1797.

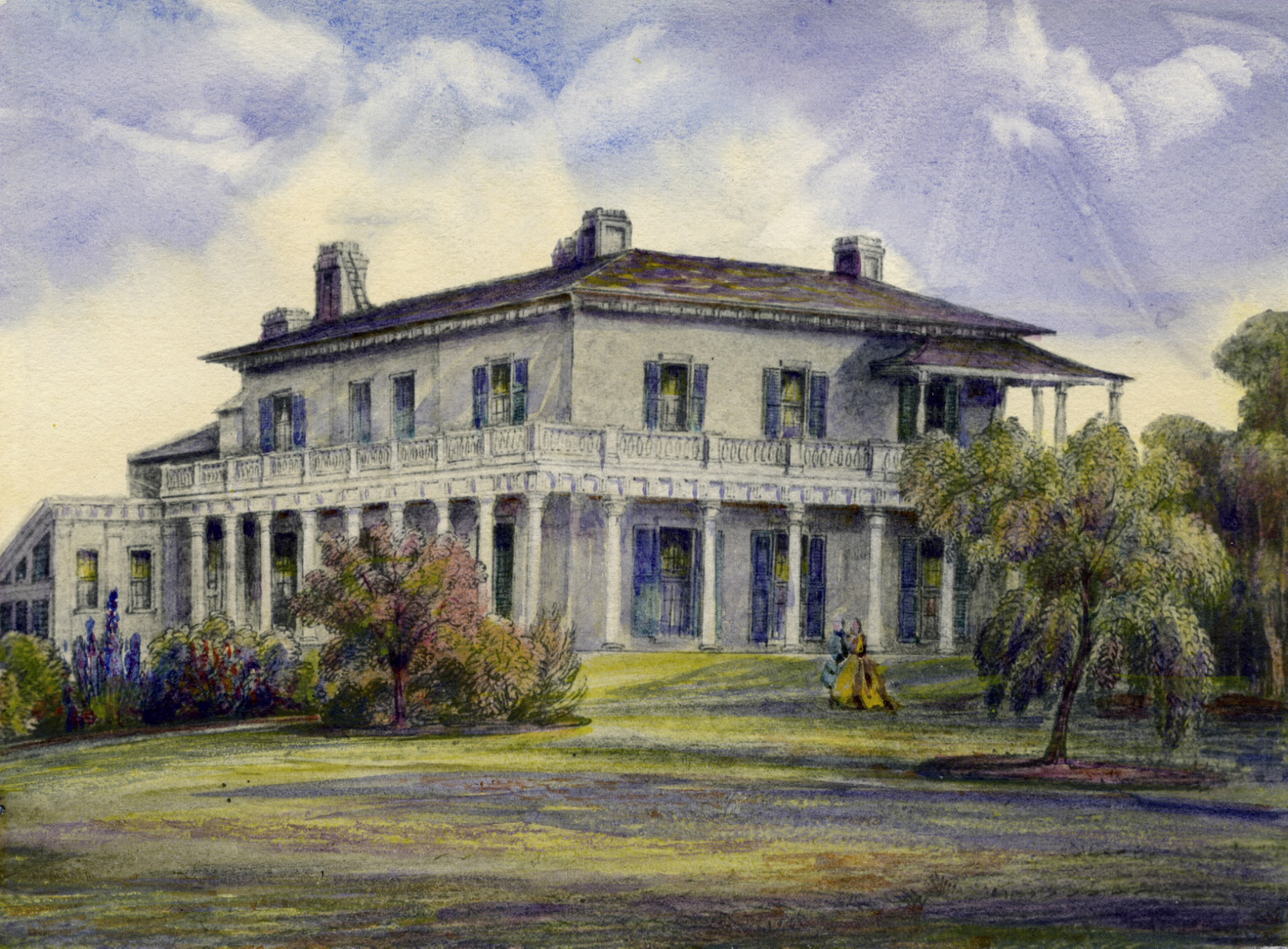
Elmsley House, Toronto. Built 1798.

In July, 1797, Parliament was held at York, but a compromise had been met with a bill passed to permit the courts to remain at Niagara-on-the-Lake for a further two years. Elmsley finally moved to York in the spring of 1798, building a large house that later became the Lieutenant-Governor's residence. The administrator (Russell) and the chief justice (Elmsley) continued to disagree about almost everything.

Concerning land grants and tariffs with Lower Canada, Elmsley was greatly influenced by his friend Richard Cartwright, generally supporting the Loyalist and merchant points of view. In legal matters, he tried to adapt English law to Canadian circumstances but was consistently opposed by Allcock, who believed that there should be absolutely no tampering with English law, procedures, and precedents. Elmsley was one of the few university graduates in the province, and was much given to elegant phrases and Latin quotations, a habit that may not have endeared him to all his colleagues.

== Lower Canada and death ==
When the Duke of Portland appointed Elmsley to the Chief Justiceship of Upper Canada, he also promised him promotion to the Chief Justiceship of Lower Canada as soon as the post became vacant. In 1800, fearing he would lose money with another move, Elmsley withdrew his claim. Despite his reluctance, he was appointed to the Lower Canadian post in 1802, following the resignation of William Osgoode. The salary was increased from £1,000 to £1,500 a year, and he was to be called to the Executive and Legislative Councils of Lower Canada with a 'seat next in Rank to the Lieutenant Governor.'

He traveled to Montreal in February 1805 with plans to go to the United States after he had become seriously ill in November of the previous year. He died in Montreal on April 29, 1805. He was buried at the old English Burial Grounds or St Lawrence/Dorchester Cemetery on rue Dorchester (now Boulevard René Levesque) which closed in the mid-1800s with graves relocated to Mont Royal or lost.

== Legacy ==
When the Fort York Government House was destroyed in the War of 1812 by an explosion from the British ammunition magazine, Chief Justice Elmsley's house was purchased on King Street and converted into the new Government House. Despite this it was still called Elmsley House for a long period.

Elmsley's widow sold the north half of Park Lot 11 to provide land for King's College (now the University of Toronto).

Elmsley's son Captain John Elmsley sold land to build St. Basil's Church and college next to his brother's Barnstable estate.

== Personal ==
Elmsley's wife and children left for England following his death.

Elmsley's son Captain John Elmsley (1801-1863) was a member of the Legislative Council of Upper Canada for York 1831 to 1841 and Executive Council of Upper Canada 1830 to 1839. Captain Elmsley converted as a Roman Catholic and is buried at St. Michael's Cathedral (Toronto).

Son Remegius Elmsley built his estate, Barnstaple next to St. Basil College.

Legal offices
Preceded by William Osgoode; 1792–1794	Chief Justice of Upper Canada; 1796–1802	Succeeded by Henry Allcock

Legal offices
Preceded by William Osgoode; 1794–1801	Chief Justice of Lower Canada; 1802–1805	Succeeded by Henry Allcock
