= Executive Council of Upper Canada =

The Executive Council of Upper Canada had a similar function to the Cabinet in England but was not responsible to the Legislative Assembly. Members of the Executive Council were not necessarily members of the Legislative Assembly but were usually members of the Legislative Council. Members were appointed, often for life. The first five members were appointed in July 1792. The council was dissolved on 10 February 1841 when Upper Canada and Lower Canada were united into the Province of Canada. It was replaced by the Executive Council of the Province of Canada the same year.

After the War of 1812, the Executive Council was dominated by members of the Family Compact, an elite clique based in York.

== List of Members of the Executive Council ==
- Family Compact/Tory
- Reform
- Governor driven / loyalist
- Military officers
- 🕇 died in office

Member	Tenure		Home Commmunity	Notes	Appointer
Member	Start	End	Home Commmunity	Notes	Appointer
James Baby	July 9, 1792	🕇 Feb 19, 1833	Sandwich		John Graves Simcoe
Alexander Grant Sr	July 9, 1792	🕇 May 1813	York	Administrator 1805–06; died in the United States while in office	John Graves Simcoe
William Osgoode	July 9, 1792	July 1794	York	Chief Justice 1792–94; Chief Jutice of Lower Canada 1794-1801	John Graves Simcoe
William Robertson	July 9, 1792	Nov 4, 1792		resigned; eventually moved to Lower Canada and England; died in London	John Graves Simcoe
Peter Russell	July 9, 1792	🕇 Sep 30, 1808	York	Administrator 1796–99	John Graves Simcoe
Æneas Shaw	June 21, 1794	1807 (Note: honorary member after 1803)	York	retired	John Graves Simcoe
Jacob Mountain	June 10, 1794		Quebec City	never attended; died in Quebec City	John Graves Simcoe
John Elmsley Sr	January 1, 1796	July 1802	York	Chief Justice 1796–1802; Chief Justice of Lower Canada 1802–1805	John Graves Simcoe
John McGill	March 2, 1796	August 13, 1818	York	became Receiver General of Upper Canada (5 October 1813 to 2 December 1819)	John Graves Simcoe
David William Smith	March 2, 1796	July 1802	York	left Canada for England; died in Alnwick, Northumberland	John Graves Simcoe
Henry Allcock	October 14, 1802	September 1804	York	Chief Justice 1802–04; Chief Justice of Lower Canada 1805–08	Peter Hunter
Thomas Scott	April 8, 1805	August 1816	York	Attorney General 1801–1806; later Chief Justice of Upper Canada; granted a pension and retired	Peter Hunter
William Dummer Powell	October 8, 1808	September 1825	York	Chief Justice of Upper Canada; resigned office upon pension	Francis Gore
Prideaux Selby	October 8, 1808	🕇 May 9, 1813	York	died in office	Francis Gore
Sir Isaac Brock	September 30, 1812	🕇 Oct 13, 1812	York	Administrator 1811–12; While died heroically and buried at Queenston Heights near Newark, Upper Canada	Francis Gore
Sir Roger Hale Sheaffe	October 20, 1812	June 4, 1813	York	Administrator 1812–13; replaced after being recalled to England; died in Edinburgh	Francis Gore
Baron Francis de Rottenburg	June 19, 1813		York	Administrator 1813; never attended; left of Lower Canada and England where he died in	Francis Gore
Sir Gordon Drummond	November 4, 1813	March 1814	York	Administrator 1813–14; became Governor-General and Administrator of Canada; return to England and died there	Francis Gore
Samuel Smith	November 30, 1813	October 1825	Etobicoke	Administrator 1817–18; retired	Francis Gore
John Strachan	(Note: honorary member until 25 July 1817) May 11, 1815	(Note: All members of council resigned in protest of Lt Gov Sir Francis Bond Head refusal to seek advice of council) March 12, 1836	York	Bishop of Anglican Church in Upper Canada	Francis Gore
William Claus	February 12, 1818	September 1824	Niagara	retired? died of cancer 1826	Sir Peregrine Maitland
George Herchmer Markland	(Note: honorary member until 6 July 1827) October 22, 1822	March 12, 1836	York	died in Kingston, Ontario	Sir Peregrine Maitland
Peter Robinson	December 24, 1823	March 12, 1836	York		Sir Peregrine Maitland
James Buchanan Macaulay	May 5, 1825	July 1829	York	resigned and appointed temporary judge of the Court of Queen's Bench, later as permanent judge	Sir Peregrine Maitland
William Campbell	October 26, 1825	March 1828	York	unable to attend due to poor health and retired 1829; Chief Justice of Upper Canada 1825-1829	Sir Peregrine Maitland
John Beverley Robinson	April 25, 1829	January 25, 1831	York	resigned; Solicitor General 1815–1818; Attorney General 1818–1829; acting Attorney General 1812–1814	Sir John Colborne
Joseph Wells	September 13, 1830	March 12, 1836	York		Sir John Colborne
John Elmsley Jr	September 20, 1830	1833	York	Resigned following disagreement with Colborne	Sir John Colborne
Robert Baldwin	February 20, 1836	March 12, 1836	Toronto	Rejoined Executive Council of the Province of Canada following union	Sir Francis Bond Head
John Henry Dunn	February 20, 1836	March 12, 1836	Toronto	Rejoined Executive Council of the Province of Canada following union	Sir Francis Bond Head
John Rolph	February 20, 1836	March 12, 1836	Toronto		Sir Francis Bond Head
William Allan	March 14, 1836	February 10, 1841	Toronto		Sir Francis Bond Head
Augustus Warren Baldwin	March 14, 1836	February 10, 1841	Toronto	re-appointed to the Legislative Council of the Province of Canada	Sir Francis Bond Head
John Elmsley Jr	March 14, 1836	January 8, 1839	Toronto	second term; died in Toronto 1863	Sir Francis Bond Head
Robert Baldwin Sullivan (Note: Sullivan's political alligence shift numerous times, but his service in council during this period was in support of the Lieutenent Governor)	March 14, 1836	February 10, 1841	Toronto	Continued service in the Executive Council of the Province of Canada; later appointed to the Queen's Bench	Sir Francis Bond Head
William Henry Draper	December 27, 1836	February 10, 1841	Toronto	Solicitor General 1837–39; Attorney General 1840–41; continued service in the Executive Council of the Province of Canada and as Attorney General for Canada West; elected to the 1st Parliament of the Province of Canada 1841	Sir Francis Bond Head
Richard Alexander Tucker	December 8, 1838	February 10, 1841	Kingston	appointed registrar of the Province of Canada in 1841–1851; retired to England 1851	Sir George Arthur
Isaac Fraser	July 16, 1839	February 10, 1841	Ernestown		Sir George Arthur
