= Thomas Blackwood =

Canadian pioneer

Thomas Blackwood (10 February 1773 – 22 November 1842) was born in Scotland and came to Canada in 1790 and was employed in the mercantile trade at Quebec.

Blackwood was employed by John Blackwood, a wealthy businessman, who does not appear to have been a relative. He next joined James McGill and operated the Great Lakes fur trade in Michilimackinac at Mackinac Island for McGill's company.
