= Charles-Louis Tarieu de Lanaudière =

Soldier, seigneur and political figure in Lower Canada

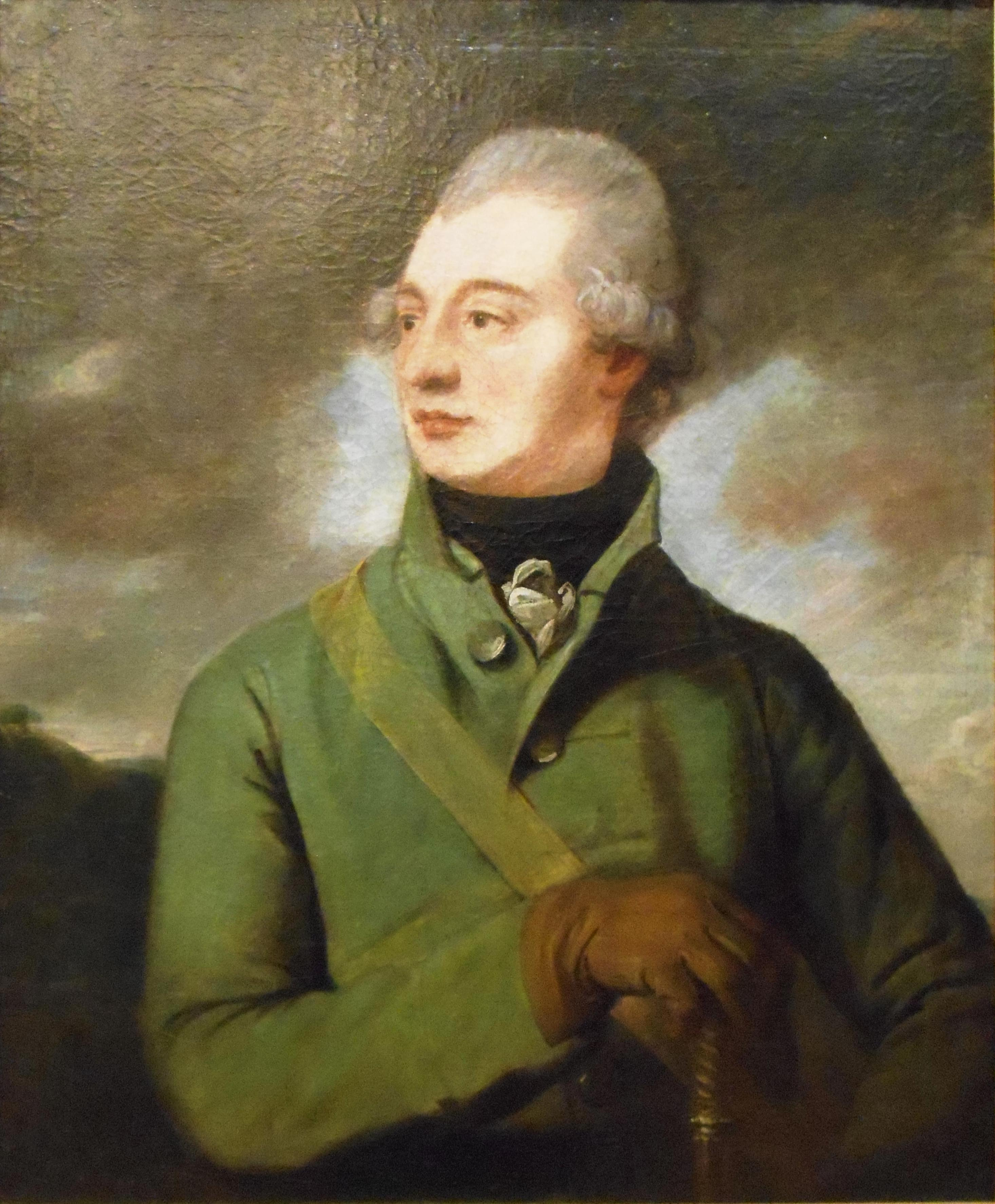
Charles-Louis Tarieu de Lanaudière

Charles-Louis Tarieu de Lanaudière (October 14, 1743 – October 2, 1811) was a soldier, seigneur and political figure in Lower Canada.

He was born in Quebec City in 1743, the son of seigneur Charles-François Tarieu de La Naudière, and studied at the Petit Séminaire de Québec. He joined the Régiment de La Sarre in 1756 and was wounded in the Battle of Sainte-Foy. Lanaudière returned to France with his regiment in 1760 but came back to Quebec in 1768. The following year, he married Geneviève-Élisabeth, the daughter of Luc de La Corne. He was named aide-de-camp for Governor Guy Carleton. In 1771, he was appointed surveyor general of woods and waters; he refused the offer of a baronetcy for religious reasons. In 1777, he took part in a military expedition into New York led by Major-General John Burgoyne. In 1786, Lanaudière was named to the Legislative Council of Quebec and, in 1792, to the Legislative Council of Lower Canada. He also served as overseer of highways and superintendent of postal services. From his mother, he inherited land in the seigneury of Lac-Maskinongé (also known as Lanaudière) and, from his father, the seigneury of Sainte-Anne De La Pérade. In 1799, he was named quartermaster general of the militia.

He died at Quebec City in 1811.

His half-brother Charles-Gaspard served in the legislative assembly and legislative council in Lower Canada.
