= Ann Kirby =

Canadian businesswoman

Ann Kirby (1770–1850) was a Canadian businesswoman. She managed a major trading company in Kingston, Ontario from 1800 until 1850, after the death of her husband. She was a leading public figure in Kingston, and was known as a philanthropist.

Her brother John Kirby was a politician. Her son John Macaulay was also a politician.
