= Pierre-Paul Margane de Lavaltrie =

Canadian politician

Pierre-Paul Margane de Lavaltrie (August 13, 1743 – September 10, 1810) was a seigneur and political figure in Lower Canada.

He was born in Montreal in 1743, the only son of Pierre-Paul Margane de Lavaltrie, a seigneur and captain in the French army based in New France.

He joined the colonial army at the age of 13, becoming lieutenant and fought at the Battle of the Plains of Abraham in 1759. The following year, he returned with his regiment to France. In 1765, he returned to Quebec at his father's request and inherited the seigneury of Lavaltrie the following year after his father died. Later that year, he married Marie-Angélique, the daughter of seigneur Louis de La Corne, dit La Corne l'aîné. In 1775, he took part in the defence of Fort St. Johns (later Saint-Jean-sur-Richelieu) against the invading Americans and continued to aid in the defence of the colony until the Americans withdrew in 1776.

Lavaltrie inherited the seigneuries of Terrebonne, Argenteuil, and Monnoir but chose to relinquish them to focus on the upkeep of Lavaltrie. In 1788, he was named a justice of the peace. Although he had opposed constitutional change, Lavaltrie was elected to the 1st Parliament of Lower Canada for Warwick in 1792. He did not run in 1796 and his son-in-law, Charles-Gaspard Tarieu de Lanaudière, was elected in Warwick instead. Lavaltrie also served in the local militia, reaching the rank of colonel.

He died at his manor in Lavaltrie in 1810.
