= Edward Bowen (politician) =

Canadian politician

The Honourable Edward Bowen
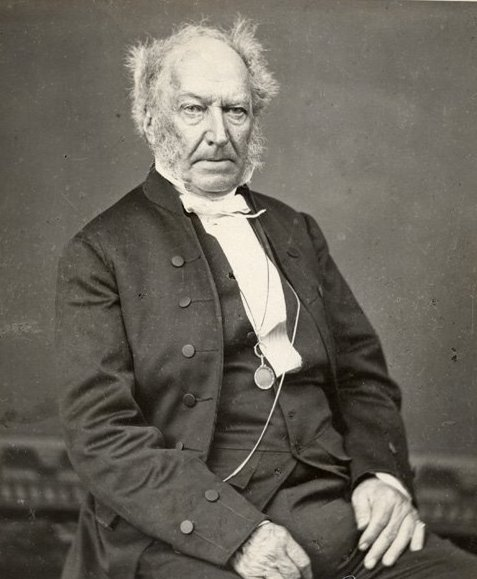

1st Chief Justice of the Superior Court for Quebec; French: L'honorable juge en chef de la Cour supérieure du Québec
- In office 1849–1866
- Succeeded by: The Hon. Sir William Collis Meredith QC

2nd Chancellor of Bishop's University
- In office 1856–1858
- Preceded by: The Hon. William Walker
- Succeeded by: The Hon. John Samuel McCord

Personal details
- Born: December 1, 1780 Kinsale, County Cork
- Died: April 11, 1866 (aged 85) Quebec City
- Resting place: Mount Hermon Cemetery, Sillery
- Spouse: Eliza Davidson
- Children: 16
- Education: Drogheda Academy
- Profession: Judge; lawyer; politician; author

Edward Bowen (December 1, 1780 – April 11, 1866) was an Irish-born lawyer, judge and political figure in Lower Canada. He was the first Chief Justice of the Superior Court for provincial Quebec, the second Chancellor of Bishop's University, in Sherbrooke, and the first King's Counsel in Lower Canada in 1809.

Bowen's success in Eastern/French Canada came from his "family relationships, social connections, his numerous office positions, and his ability." However, Bowen also solidified his status as an elite in colonial affairs by "working together with the British commercial bourgeoisie, monopolizing executive and state patronage in posts, land speculation, and contracts, and controlling much of the legislative power." What made Bowen himself the man to go to with legal issues in Quebec in particular, was that "Bowen had a good knowledge of the French and of French laws - unlike many within the aforementioned administrating group of the Colony following and representing British rule onto the Lower and Upper/Eastern and Western Canadians.

== Life ==
Born in Kinsale in 1780, he was the son of James Bowen (1740–1796), Staff Surgeon in the British Army, who died at Martinique. His mother, Isabella, was the daughter of Richard Sheffield Cassan of Sheffield, County Offaly, and his wife Isabella Hamilton, sister of the Rt. Rev. Hugh Hamilton, Bishop of Ossory. Educated at Drogheda Academy, Bowen came to Lower Canada in 1797, with his great-aunt Anne Hamilton, and her husband, Lt.-Colonel Henry Caldwell. He studied law and entered the offices of Jonathan Sewell. He was called to the bar of Lower Canada in 1803. Bowen served as Lieutenant and then Captain in the Quebec militia.

In 1808, he was chosen as attorney general for Lower Canada by Governor Sir James Henry Craig; he was forced to step down after Norman Fitzgerald Uniacke was chosen by the authorities in London. He was named King's Counsel in 1809, and also served as acting attorney general from 1810 to 1812. In 1809, he was elected to the Legislative Assembly of Lower Canada for William-Henry; he supported the English party. In 1812, he was named judge in the Court of King's Bench at Quebec. He was named to the Legislative Council in 1824. In 1849, he was named chief justice to the newly appointed Superior Court. Bowen also served as French translator for the Executive Council and French secretary for the province.

He died at Quebec City in 1866, and was buried at Mount Hermon Cemetery, section A, in the formerly independent city of Sillery, which was amalgamated into Quebec City, in 2002. The Rev. G. V. Housman, of the Church of England, was the officiating clergyman. Bowen was the owner of the cemetery's land in 1830.

For many years a portrait of Edward Bowen hung in the Senate chamber in Ottawa.

It is documented within Bowen's online biography in the Dictionary of Canadian Biography(aka the DBC in French) that his "family relationships, social connections, his numerous offices, and obvious ability all ensured Edward Bowen a place in the élite of important colonial officials who, together with the British commercial bourgeoisie, monopolized the executive power and state patronage (positions, land speculation, contracts), and controlled much of the legislative power. Unlike many of this group, Bowen had a good knowledge of French and of French laws."

== Family ==
In 1819, Bowen built a commodious two-story house cut from local stone, of six or seven bays. Two end bays projected forward from the central two bays, suggestive of both French and English architectural influence, but in contrast to the earlier French traditions at Quebec. The house stood on Mount Carmel Street (formerly Cathedral Street) in Quebec City. In 1807, Bowen had married Eliza, the daughter of James Davidson, a surgeon formerly attached to the Royal Canadian Volunteers. They had eight sons and eight daughters:

- Alicia Catherine Aubigvey Bowen
- Ann Emily Bowen
- Charlotte Louise Caldwell Bowen
- Eliza Cecilia Bowen, married The Hon. Edward Hale, of Quebec
- Isabella Cassan Bowen
- Louisa Aylmer Bowen
- Lucy Irwin Bowen
- Mary Sophia Bowen
- Charles Marshall Bowen
- Charles William Bowen
- Edward Henry Bowen
- Francis Nathaniel Burton Bowen
- George Frederick Bowen
- George Mountain Bowen
- James Bowen
- Noel Hill Fox Maule Bowen
- William Hamilton Bowen

A photograph of Bowen's daughter Isabella Cassan is on exhibit at Piney Grove at Southall's Plantation in Virginia, United States. An oil portrait of Bowen's granddaughter, Isabella Forsyth Bell, and photograph of his great-grandson, Frederick Noel Bell Hyndman, are also exhibited. The furnishings of Piney Grove at Southall's Plantation includes pieces of furniture and silver that have a family history of descending in the Bowen family from Canada. Piney Grove is owned by Joan Gordineer, a great, great, great granddaughter of Edward Bowen.
