= Louis-René Chaussegros de Léry =

Louis-René Chaussegros de Léry (October 13, 1762 – November 28, 1832) was a seigneur, soldier and political figure in Lower Canada.

He was born in Paris in 1762, the son of seigneur Gaspard-Joseph Chaussegros de Léry and Louise Martel de Brouague, the daughter of François Martel de Brouague. He stayed in France until 1770, when he rejoined his parents at Quebec. He studied at the Séminaire de Québec and then returned to France, where he joined the king's bodyguard. During the French Revolution, he relocated to Prussia and fought against the revolution.

In 1792, he travelled to England and then Lower Canada. Chaussegros de Léry was named captain in the Royal Canadian Volunteer Regiment in 1798 and served until the regiment was dissolved in 1802. In 1799, he married Madeleine-Charlotte, the daughter of seigneur René-Amable Boucher de Boucherville. He was named chief road commissioner for Montreal district in 1806. He was also named a justice of the peace. He served in the local militia during the War of 1812, becoming lieutenant-colonel in 1813. In 1818, Chaussegros de Léry was named to the Legislative Council of Lower Canada.

He died while still in office at Boucherville in 1832.

His brother Charles-Étienne was a member of the executive council and the special council that administered the province after the Lower Canada Rebellion.
