= John Kirby (Canadian politician) =

John Kirby (1772 – December 19, 1846) was a businessman and political figure in Upper Canada.

He was born in Knaresborough, England in 1772 and arrived in the Fort Ticonderoga area of New York with his parents in 1774. His father moved to St. Johns (now Saint-Jean-sur-Richelieu) in Lower Canada after the American Revolution. He later moved to Kingston, where he became a merchant, importing and exporting goods. In 1818, he was appointed magistrate in the Midland District. He owned shares in steamships on Lake Ontario and helped found and was later president of the Cataraqui Bridge Company. He also served as director for the Bank of Upper Canada and the Commercial Bank of the Midland District. He was also an active supporter of the Church of England. He supported the development of schools and hospitals and helped support needy immigrants settling in the region. He served on the Legislative Council of Upper Canada from 1831 to 1841 and was a lieutenant-colonel in the local militia.

He died in Kingston in 1846.

His sister Ann Kirby was a businesswoman.
