= Council for the Affairs of the Province of Quebec =

Type
- Type: Unicameral
- Houses: Legislative Council of Quebec

History
- Founded: 1774
- Disbanded: 1791
- Preceded by: Sovereign Council of New France (until 1760)
- Succeeded by: Parliament of Lower Canada

The Council for the Affairs of the Province of Quebec, more commonly called the Legislative Council of Quebec (but not to be confused with the later institution with that same name), was an advisory body constituted by section XII of the Quebec Act of 1774. Together with the representative of the Crown (the Governor, Lieutenant-Governor or the temporary Administrator of the province), it acted, between 1774 and 1791, as the legislature of the old Province of Quebec.

== Powers ==
The Council had the "Power and Authority to make Ordinances for the Peace, Welfare, and good Government, of the said Province, with the Consent of his Majesty's Governor, or, in his Absence, of the Lieutenant-governor, or Commander in Chief for the Time being.", excepting the power to:

"lay any Taxes or Duties within the said Province, such Rates and Taxes only excepted as the Inhabitants of any Town or District within the said Province may be authorized by the said Council to assess, levy, and apply, within the said Town or District. for the Purpose of making Roads, erecting and repairing publick Buildings, or for any other Purpose respecting the local Convenience and economy of such Town or District."

— Sections XII and XIII of Quebec Act, 1774

== Eligibility ==
Section VII of the Quebec Act opened the door of all provincial offices to Roman Catholic subjects. The section exempted Catholics from taking the Test Oath (the abjuration of the Catholic faith) and made them take an alternative oath of allegiance to the British Crown:

I, A.B., do sincerely promise and swear: That I will be faithful, and bear true Allegiance to his Majesty King George, and him will defend to the utmost of my Power, against all traitorous Conspiracies, and Attempts whatsoever, which shall be made against his Person, Crown, and Dignity; and I will do my utmost Endeavor to disclose and make known to his Majesty, his Heirs and Successors, all Treasons, and traitorous Conspiracies, and Attempts, which I shall know to be against him, or any of them; and all this I do swear without any Equivocation, mental Evasion, or secret Reservation, and renouncing all Pardons and Dispensations from any Power or Person whomsoever to the contrary. So help me GOD.

— Section VII of the Quebec Act, 1774

Because of this special oath they were required to vow, Canadian Catholics, who formed the immense majority of the population in the province, were permitted to take a more direct part to the legislation of their native country. In practise however, Catholic Legislative Councillors remained a minority in the Council from its creation in 1774 to its abolition in 1791.

== Composition ==
Councillors numbered between at least seventeen and no more than twenty-three. In 1775, Colonial Secretary Lord Dartmouth instructed Governor General Guy Carleton to call in these individuals to fill in the Council:

Name	First Appointed	No. of terms	Notes
Hector Theophilus de Cramahé	1775	1st term	Lieutenant Governor
Hugh Finlay	1775	1st term	
Thomas Dunn	1775	1st term	
James Cuthbert	1775	1st term	
Colin Drummond	1775	1st term	
François Lévesque	1775	1st term	
Edward Harrison	1775	1st term	
John Collins	1775	1st term	
Adam Mabane	1775	1st term	
Gaspard-Joseph Chaussegros de Léry	1775	1st term	
Paul-Roch de Saint-Ours	1775	1st term	
Pécaudy de Contrecœur	1775	1st term	
George Waters Allsopp	1775	1st term	
Charles-François Tarieu de La Naudière	1775	1st term	
La Corne Saint-Luc	1775	1st term	
Alexander Johnstone	1775	1st term	
Conrad Gugy	1775	1st term	
François-Marie Picoté de Belestre	1775	1st term	
Charles-Régis Des Bergères de Rigauville	1775	1st term	
John Fraser	1775	1st term	

Some of these members had been sitting on the first Council of Quebec constituted by Governor General James Murray in 1764 to advise on all matters of State. About 12 years later, in May 1787, the Council's composition was:

Name	First Appointed	No. of terms
Hector Theophilus de Cramahé	1775	2nd term
William Smith	1787	1st term
Edward Harrison	1775	2nd term
Adam Mabane	1775	2nd term
Gaspard-Joseph Chaussegros de Léry	1787	1st term
John Fraser	1775	2nd term
William Grant	1787	1st term
François Baby	1787	1st term
Samuel Johannes Holland	1787	1st term
René-Amable Boucher de Boucherville	1787	1st term
Hugh Finlay	1775	2nd term
John Collins	1775	2nd term
George Pownall	1787	1st term
François-Marie Picoté de Belestre	1775	2nd term
Henry Caldwell	1787	1st term
Paul-Roch de Saint-Ours	1775	2nd term
Joseph-Dominique-Emmanuel Le Moyne de Longueuil	1787	1st term
John Johnson,	1787	1st term
Jean-Baptiste Le Comte Dupré	1787	1st term

With the adoption of the Constitutional Act of 1791, the sections of the Quebec Act dealing with the Council, its composition, and powers, were repealed. However, most of the members then sitting on the Council were called into the new Legislative Council of Lower Canada created by the said act.

== See also ==
- Constitutional history of Canada
