= Monklands =

Monklands was an ancient parish in the Scottish county of Lanarkshire. In 1641 the parish was divided between:

- New Monkland (present-day Airdrie, North Lanarkshire)
- Old Monkland (present-day Coatbridge).

Monklands may now refer to:

- Monklands (district) that was formerly (1975–96) a local government district in the Strathclyde region of Scotland
  - Monklands Hospital in the area
  - Monklands East (UK Parliament constituency), 1983 to 1997
  - Monklands West (UK Parliament constituency), 1983 to 1997

Additionally:

- The Monklands was the name of the mansion where the Governor General of Canada lived from 1844 to 1849, before it was bought by nuns and turned into the Villa María girls school

== See also ==
- Monkland (disambiguation)
