= John Macaulay (politician) =

John Macaulay (October 17, 1792 – August 10, 1857) was a businessman, newspaper owner and political figure in Upper Canada.

He was born in 1792 in Kingston, the son of Robert Macaulay and Ann Kirby. He was educated in Cornwall at John Strachan's school. In 1812, he established himself as a merchant in Kingston. In 1818, with Alexander Pringle, he purchased the Kingston Gazette, renaming it the Kingston Chronicle. Although the paper prided itself on its independence, it has close ties to the members of the Family Compact. In 1822, Macaulay helped engineer the removal of Barnabas Bidwell from the Legislative Assembly. His paper voiced his views on the importance of developing the Upper Canada economy, including improving internal navigation to help promote commerce. His opinions played an important role in launching the era of canal-building that was to follow. In 1822, he became the agent for the Bank of Upper Canada at Kingston and secretary to James Baby, who was arbitrating the sharing of customs duties between Upper and Lower Canada at the time.

In 1835, he was appointed to the Legislative Council for the province and, in 1836, he became surveyor general and a customs arbitrator. He moved to Toronto, then the provincial capital. In 1838, he was appointed inspector general for the province when George Herchmer Markland resigned. Although he had misgivings, he voted for union with Lower Canada. He was re-appointed to the Legislative Council for United Canada; however, because ministers were now expected to hold a seat in the Legislative Assembly, he resigned as inspector general.

He suffered a stroke in 1855 and died at Kingston in 1857.
