= Augustus Warren Baldwin =

Canadian politician and naval officer

Augustus Warren Baldwin (October 1, 1776 – January 5, 1866) was a naval officer and political figure in Upper Canada.

He was born near Lisnagat in County Cork, Ireland in 1776 and joined the merchant navy in 1792, eventually being given command of his own ship. He retired to Upper Canada near York (Toronto) in 1817. He named his estate Russell Hill after his family's farm in Ireland. In 1822, he became a magistrate of the Home District. In 1832, he was appointed to the Legislative Council for the province. When the Executive Council resigned to protest actions taken by Lieutenant Governor Sir Francis Bond Head, Baldwin accepted an appointment as a new member of the council.

In 1841, he was re-appointed to the Legislative Council of the Province of Canada, but he resigned some time later. He was a director of the Bank of Upper Canada and the British America Assurance Company. Although retired from the navy, he was promoted to admiral in 1862.

Like his brother William Warren Baldwin and his nephew Robert Baldwin, Augustus was conservative in his politics, though his relatives were associated with the reform branch of conservatism.

He died on his estate near Toronto in 1866.
