= Charles-Gaspard Tarieu de Lanaudière =

Canadian politician

Charles-Gaspard Tarieu de Lanaudière (French pronunciation: [ʃaʁl ɡaspaʁ taʁjø də lanodjɛʁ]; September 9, 1769 – June 7, 1812) was a seigneur and political figure in Lower Canada.

He was born Charles Tarieu de La Naudière in Quebec City in 1769, the son of seigneur Charles-François Tarieu de La Naudière, and studied at London. He inherited the seigneury of Saint-Vallier from his father. He was a lieutenant in the Royal Canadian Volunteer Regiment and also served as lieutenant-colonel in the local militia during the War of 1812. In 1792, he married Suzanne-Antoinette, the daughter of Pierre-Paul Margane de Lavaltrie. Lanaudière was elected to the Legislative Assembly of Lower Canada for Warwick in 1796. In 1804, he was elected in Leinster and he was named to the Legislative Council in 1811. He died at Lavaltrie while still in office in 1812.

His half-brother Charles-Louis also served on the legislative council. His daughter Charlotte married Barthélemy Joliette, and his sister Marie-Anne married François Baby.
