= Monkland Avenue =

Monkland Avenue may refer to:

- Monkland Avenue (Montreal), a street in Monkland Village
- Monkland Avenue (Ottawa), the southern terminus of Metcalfe Street
