= John Blackwood (merchant) =

Canadian merchant and politician

John Blackwood (died 24 June 1819) was probably born in England; we have knowledge of his being in Quebec in 1776, taking part in the defence of Quebec. He subsequently was in business there and became a wealthy merchant through his business and his second marriage.

Blackwood was elected to the Legislative Assembly of Lower Canada in an 1805 by-election caused by the death of William Grant. The seat was Upper Town of Quebec and he represented it until 1810. In 1813 he received an appointment to the Legislative Council of Lower Canada, a position he held until his death. During much of this appointment he was in England.
