= William Osgoode =

Canadian judge

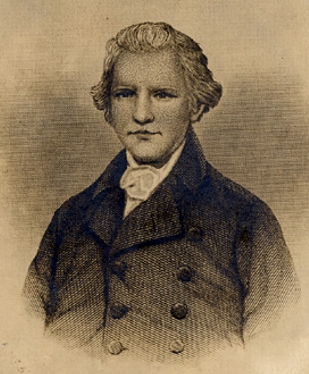

Chief Justice of Upper Canada
- In office 1792–1794
- Preceded by: new title
- Succeeded by: John Elmsley

Chief Justice of Lower Canada
- In office 1794–1801
- Preceded by: William Smith
- Succeeded by: Henry Allcock

Personal details
- Born: March 1754 London, United Kingdom
- Died: 17 January 1824 (aged 69) London, United Kingdom
- Education: Christ Church, Oxford
- Occupation: Barrister
- Profession: Canadian and English jurist

William Osgoode (March 1754 – 17 January 1824) was the first Chief Justice of Upper Canada (now known as Ontario, Canada).

== Life and career ==
He was born William Osgood in London, England, in 1754 to William Osgood (died 1767). His family was Methodist and John Wesley recounted on Sunday, 13 December 1767 of his father that

I was desired to preach a funeral sermon for William Osgood. He came to London nearly thirty years ago, and from nothing increased more and more, till he was worth several thousands of pounds. He was a good man, and died in peace. Nevertheless, I believe his money was a great clog to him, and kept him in a poor, low state all his days, making no such advance as he might have done, either in holiness or happiness.

He matriculated at Christ Church, Oxford in 1768, graduating B.A. in 1772, and M.A. in 1777; and was and was called to the bar at Lincoln's Inn in 1779. On 31 December 1791, he was appointed first Chief Justice of Upper Canada. Although he mainly sought the opinions of lawyers from England, Osgoode attempted to adapt the English civil law of the time to fit the needs of a developing colony. For example, he allowed justices of the peace to perform marriages when Anglican priests were not readily available. Osgoode's Judicature Act of 1794 established a system of district courts and a superior provincial court. During his term, legislation was also introduced to abolish slavery. Osgoode also served as a member of John Graves Simcoe's Executive Council for Upper Canada. He also served as Speaker of the Legislative Council (the upper house of the Assembly) in both Upper Canada and Lower Canada.

In 1794, he became Chief Justice of Lower Canada. Osgoode came into conflict with Governor Robert Prescott over an attempt to sort out the issue of land grants in the region. When Prescott was recalled, he came into conflict with Prescott's successor, Lieutenant Governor Robert Shore Milnes. Refusing to recognize slavery, Osgoode systematically freed slaves brought before him in trials as Chief Justice (despite the absence of legislation prohibiting slavery). As a result (alongside the Legislative Assembly's refusal to pronounce itself on the matter), slaves deserted their masters without repercussions.

In 1801, Osgoode resigned and returned to London. He became a member of the Royal Commission on the Courts of Law and help form what eventually led to the Uniformity of Process Act in 1832. Unmarried, Osgoode died in London in 1824 and is buried in St. Mary's Church, Harrow-on-the-Hill.

Osgoode Hall, the location of the Ontario Court of Appeal and the headquarters of the Law Society of Ontario, was named after him, as was Osgoode Hall Law School. In addition, the former Osgoode Township in Ontario also bears his name.

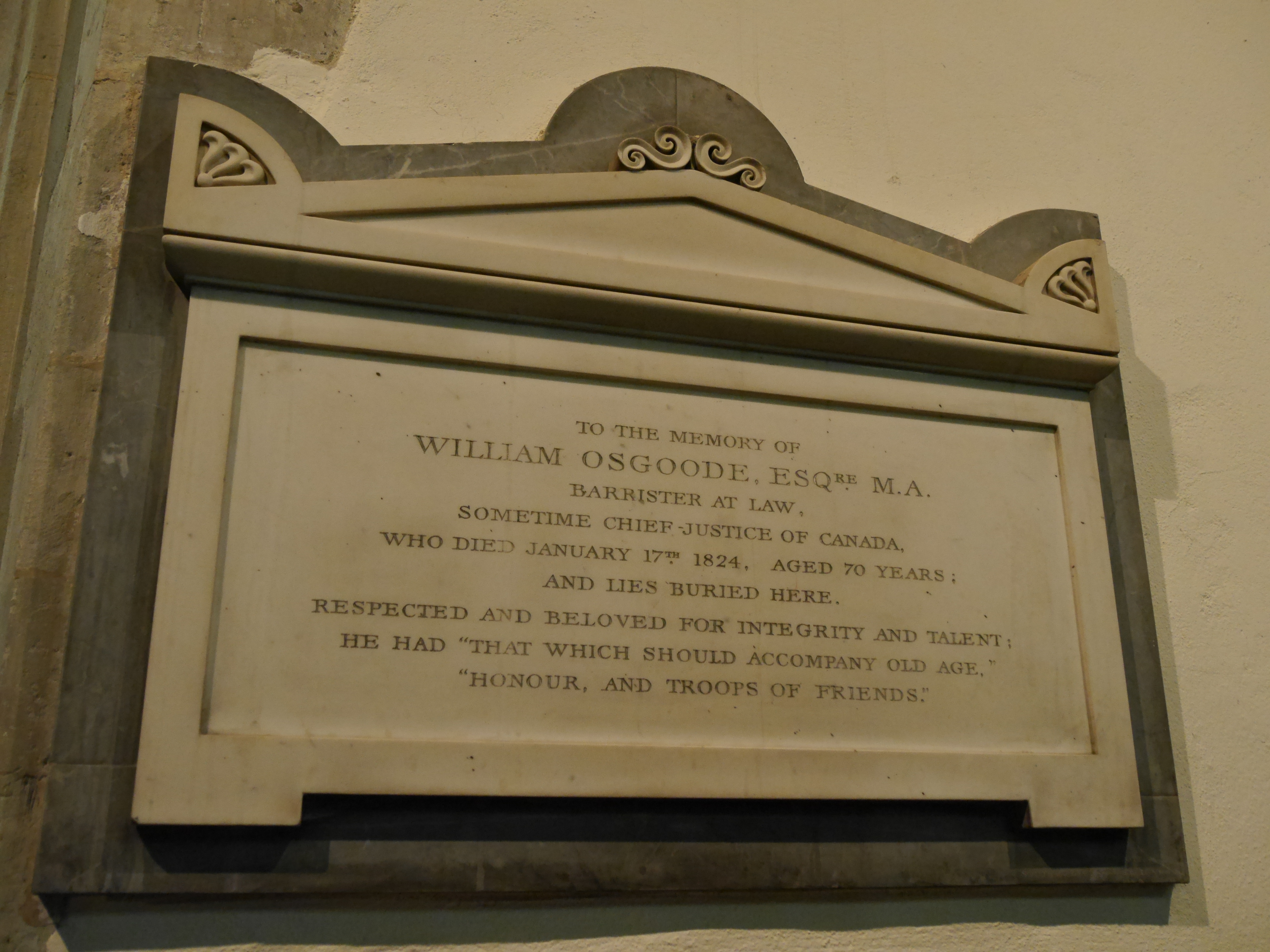
Memorial, St Mary's, Harrow on the Hill
