= Cathedral of the Holy Trinity (Quebec) =

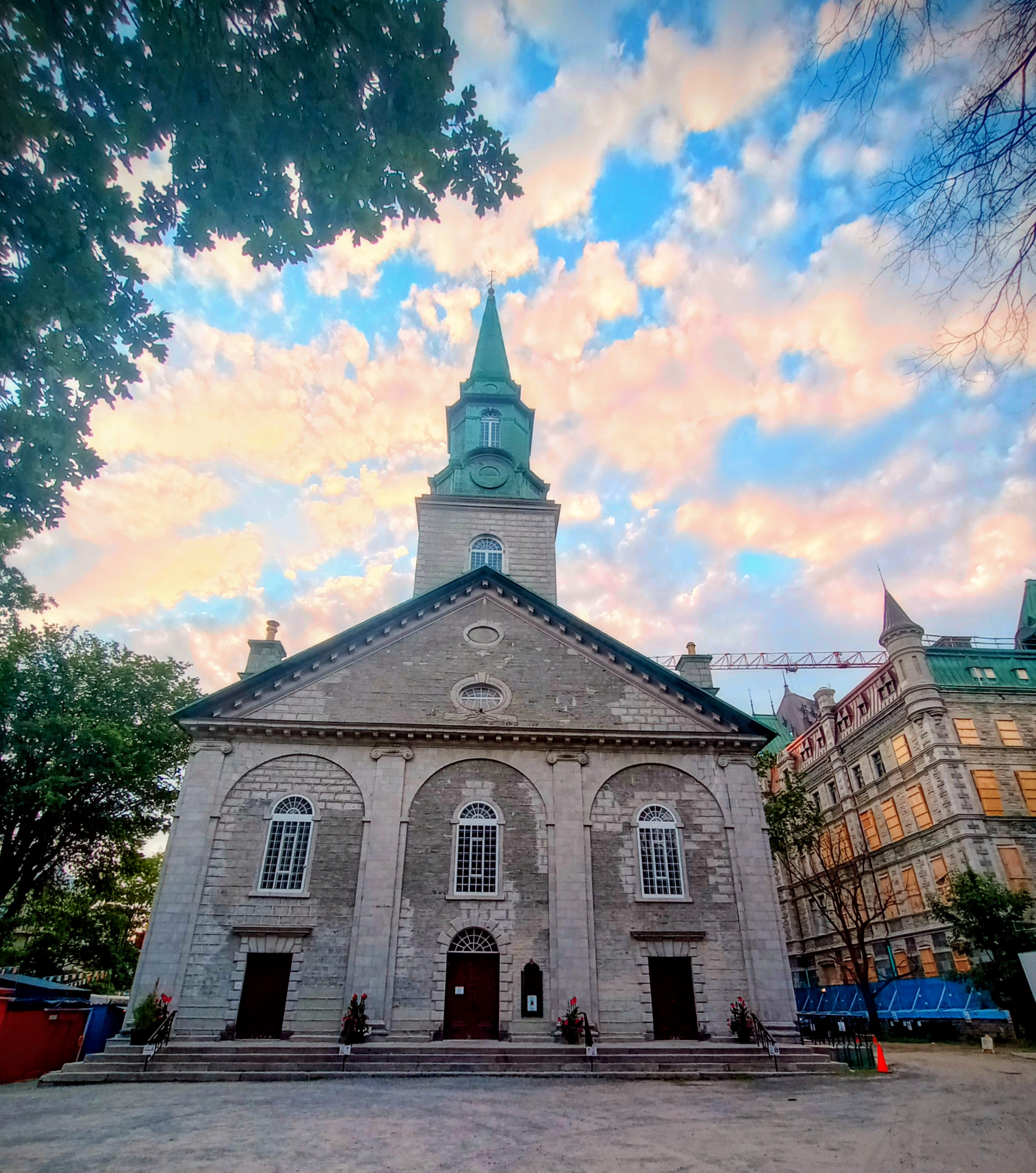
- Cathedral of the Holy Trinity
- 46.8128°N 71.2066°W
- Location: 31, rue des Jardins; Quebec City, Quebec; G1R 4L6
- Country: Canada
- Denomination: Anglican
- Website: www.cathedral.ca

History
- Status: Active
- Dedication: Holy Trinity
- Consecrated: 1804

Architecture
- Architect(s): Major William Robe and Captain William Hall
- Architectural type: Palladian
- Years built: 1800-1804

National Historic Site of Canada
- Official name: Holy Trinity Anglican Cathedral National Historic Site of Canada
- Designated: 1989

Patrimoine culturel du Québec
- Type: Historic monument
- Designated: 1989

Administration
- Province: Canada
- Diocese: Quebec
- Parish: Parish of Quebec, Paroisse de Tous les Saints

Clergy
- Bishop: Rt Rev Bruce Myers OGS
- Dean: The Very Rev'd Christian Schreiner

The Cathedral of the Holy Trinity (French: Sainte-Trinité) is the cathedral of the Anglican Diocese of Quebec. It is home to two parishes: the Parish of Quebec and la Paroisse de Tous les Saints. It stands on the western side of Quebec City's Place d'Armes.

When it was formed the Diocese of Quebec covered both Upper and Lower Canada. Today, its territory covers 720,000 km^{2} in the central and eastern parts of the province of Quebec but does not include the area around Montreal. It has 7,817 Anglicans on the parish rolls in 93 congregations. The Cathedral of the Holy Trinity was designated a National Historic Site of Canada in 1989 and plaqued in 1993. It has also been designated under provincial heritage legislation.

== History ==
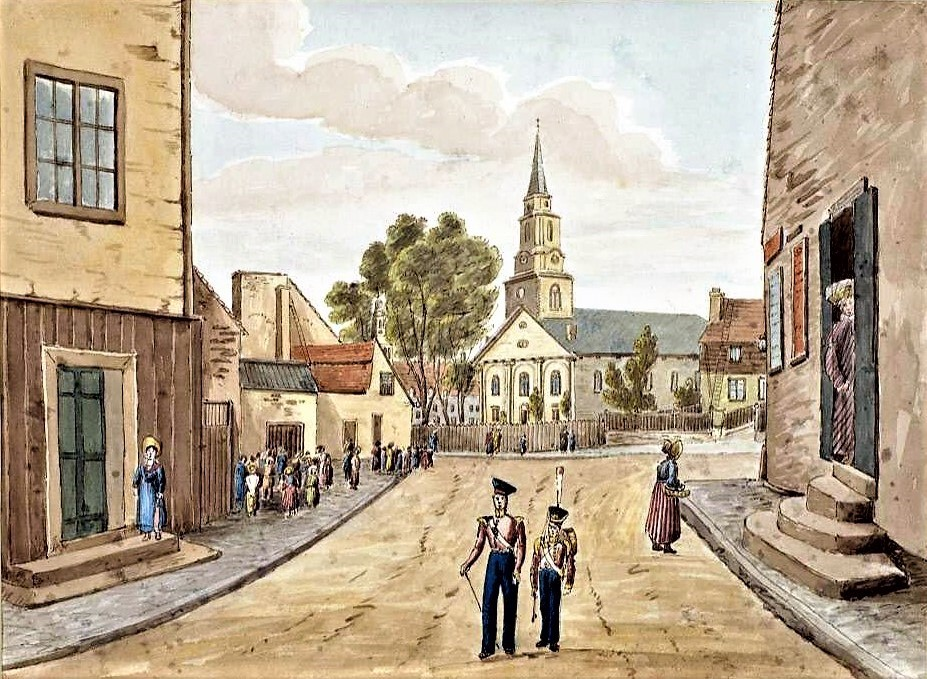
View of the Anglican cathedral from Ursulines of Quebec, 1830

The Diocese of Quebec was founded in 1793. Its first bishop, Dr. Jacob Mountain, gave his early attention to the erection of a cathedral. The completed building, designed by military officers William Robe and William Hall, was built between 1800 and 1804. It was consecrated on August 28, 1804, becoming the first Anglican cathedral to be built outside of the British Isles.

In 1859–1860 William Carter served as the cathedral's organist, and staged what was then the largest Handel Festival ever presented in Canada, in April 1859.

== Design ==
Designed in the neoclassic Palladian style, the cathedral was modeled after the St Martin-in-the-Fields Church in Trafalgar Square, London, and the Marylebone Chapel (now known as St Peter, Vere Street). King George III paid for the construction of the cathedral, and provided a folio Bible, communion silverware, and large prayer books to be used for worship.

The bell-tower is home to eight bells founded by the Whitechapel Bell Foundry in 1830, which are the oldest change-ringing peal in Canada. Due to deterioration, they were brought down in 2006, sent to Whitechapel in London for retuning, and reinstalled in April 2007.

== Burials ==
- General The 4th Duke of Richmond (1764–1819), Governor-General of British North America from 1818 until his death; formerly Lord Lieutenant of Ireland
- Jacob Mountain, 1st Anglican bishop in Canada (1749–1825), responsible for the building of the cathedral

== Gallery ==
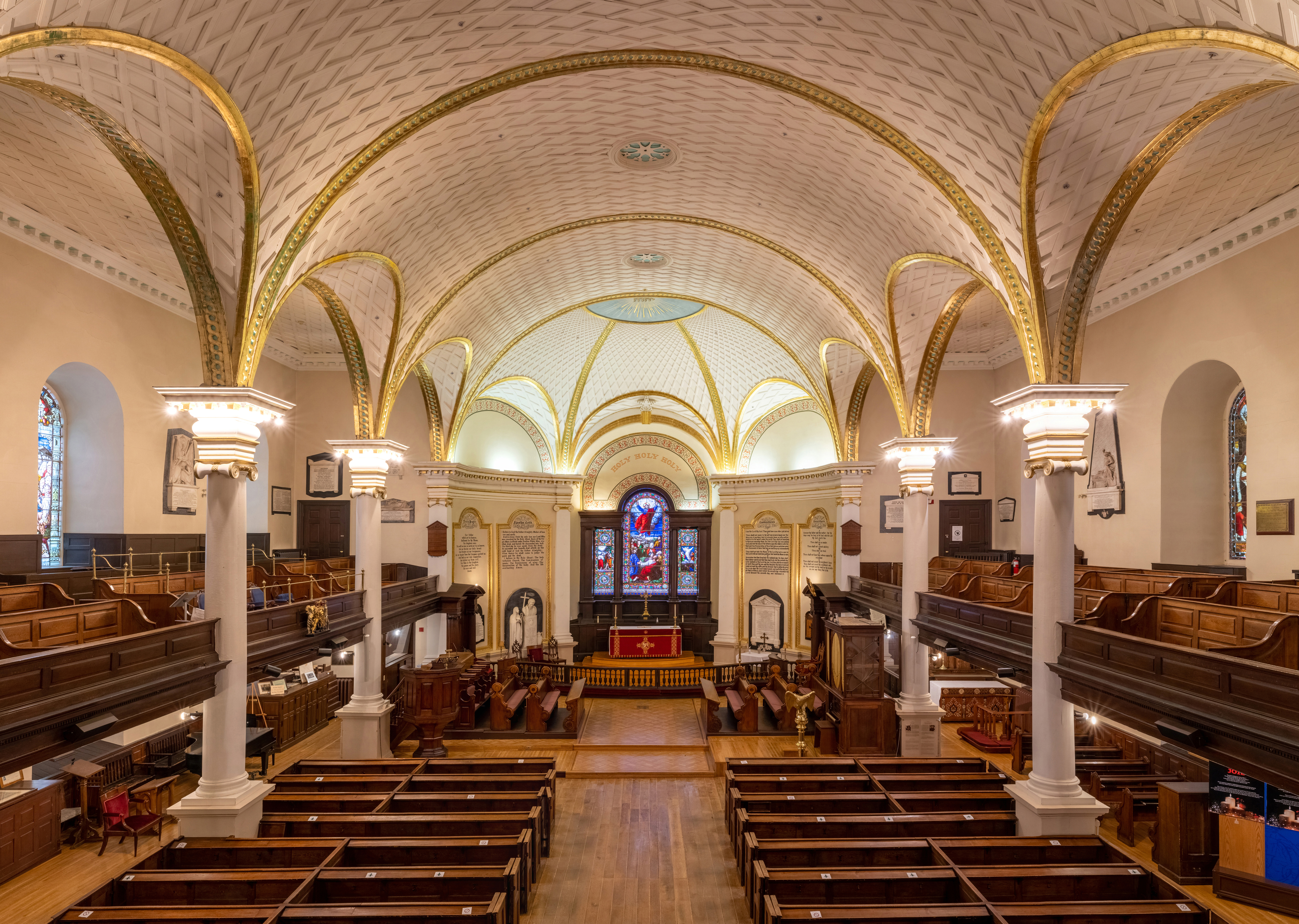
Interior
