= René-Amable Boucher de Boucherville =

René-Amable Boucher de Boucherville (February 12, 1735 – August 31, 1812) was a seigneur, soldier and political figure in Lower Canada.

He was born at Fort Frontenac (later Kingston), the son of François-Pierre Boucher de Boucherville, in 1735. He joined the colonial army of New France and served during the Seven Years' War. He was captured during reconnaissance near Fort Duquesne but later freed. He was wounded at the Battle of the Plains of Abraham, captured by the British and later sent to France as part of a prisoner exchange.

He returned to Quebec in 1763 and inherited the seigneury of Boucherville after his father's death in 1767. In 1770, he married his cousin Madeleine Raimbault de Saint-Blaint. He helped defend the province against the American invasion of 1775-6. In 1785, he was appointed as an overseer of highways for Montreal district. He was named to the Legislative Council of Lower Canada in 1786.

He died at Boucherville in 1812.

His son Pierre-Amable served as a member of the legislative council for the Province of Canada. His son Thomas-René-Verchères participated in the fur trade and was seigneur of Boucherville and Verchères. His daughter Madeleine-Charlotte married Louis-René Chaussegros de Léry, who took over the post of overseer of highways after his father-in-law's retirement.
