= Charles-François Tarieu de La Naudière =

Canadian officer and seigneur

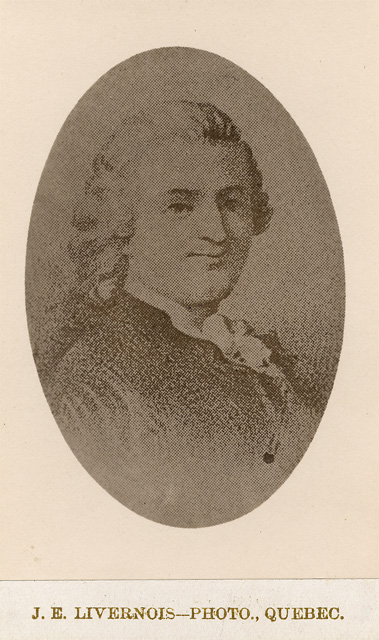
Charles-François Tarieu de La Naudière, around 1760

Charles-François Tarieu de La Naudière (French pronunciation: [ʃaʁl fʁɑ̃swa taʁjø də la nodjɛʁ]; November 4, 1710 – February 1, 1776) was an officer in the colonial regular troops and seigneur in Lower Canada.

He was able to forge a good rapport with the new British and served in the Council for the Affairs of the Province of Quebec after invitation by Governor Guy Carelton in 1775. His political role was short lived as he died in 1776.

He was the father of Charles-Gaspard Tarieu de Lanaudière, who became a political figure in Lower Canada.
