= Monkland Village =

- Neighbourhood
- Monkland Village
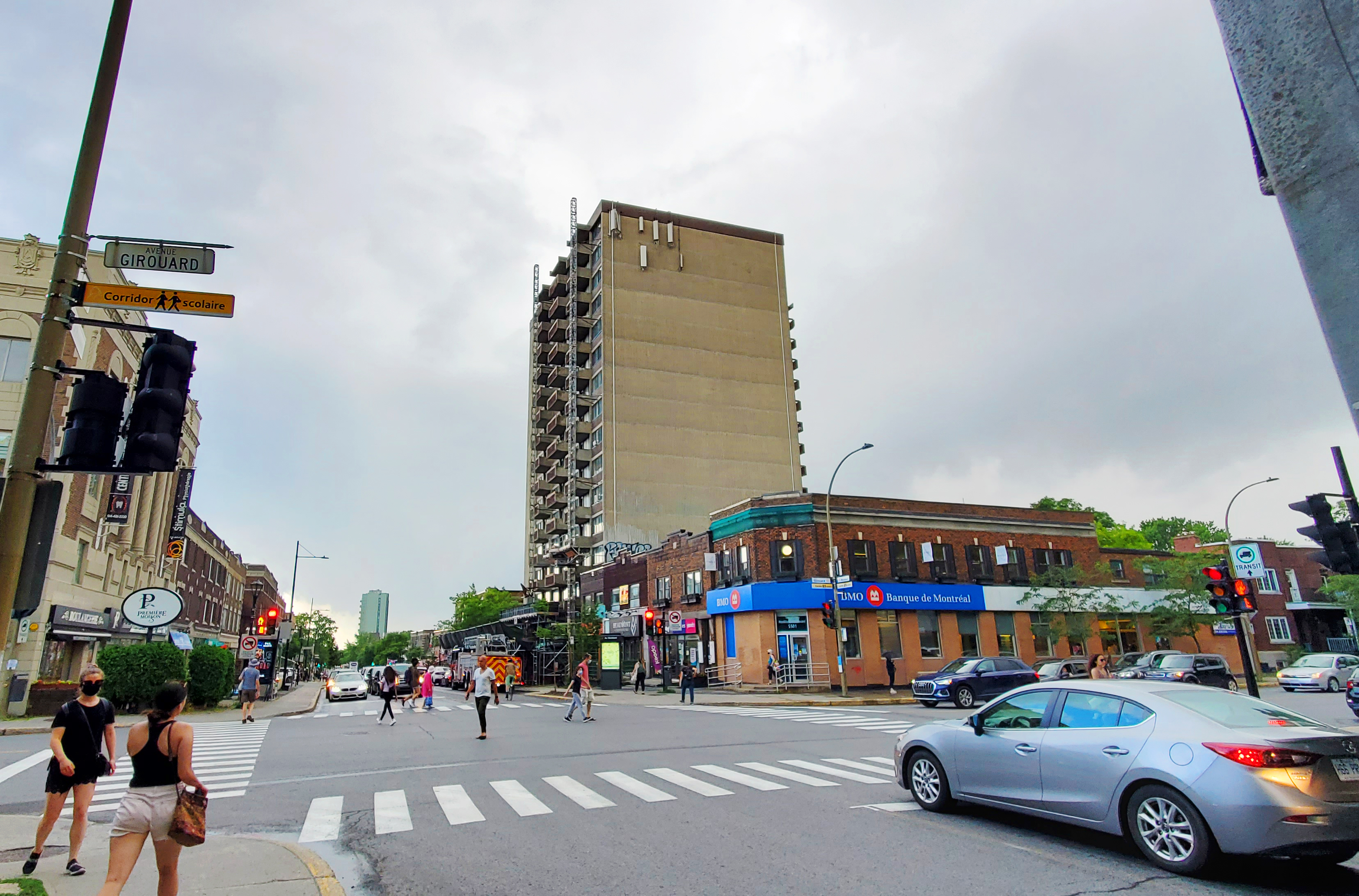
- Monkland Tower on Monkland Avenue in the summer of 2021

- Location of Monkland in Montreal
- Coordinates: 45.4751°N 73.6233°W
- Country: Canada
- Province: Quebec
- City: Montreal
- Borough: Côte-des-Neiges–Notre-Dame-de-Grâce
- Time zone: UTC-5 (EST)
  - Summer (DST): UTC-4 (EDT)
- Postal Code: H4A, H4B
- Area codes: 514, 438

Monkland Village is a neighbourhood of the Notre-Dame-de-Grâce district in the Montreal borough of Côte-des-Neiges–Notre-Dame-de-Grâce. It is located between Grand Boulevard and the Décarie Expressway/Décarie Boulevard, and between Avenue Somerled and Sherbrooke Street. The neighbourhood derives its name from Avenue Monkland (Monkland Avenue), the commercial street at the heart of it. The Villa Maria metro station is located at the eastern end of Monkland Avenue.

== Origins ==
Both the neighbourhood and the avenue are named after James Monk, who was the attorney general of Lower Canada, and chief justice to the court of the Queen's Bench from 1804 to 1824. This area in particular became associated with Monk due to the estate he built in 1804 known as Monklands, located at what is now the eastern tip of the avenue. This estate would later become the Governor General's residence, and was later sold to the Congregation de Notre-Dame who would use the building for the Villa Maria private Catholic school.

== Monkland Avenue ==
Avenue Monkland (Monkland Avenue) has been a commercial street since the 1930s. Today the strip is transforming into an upscale commercial street. It is home to many small businesses including restaurants (Local75, Monkland Tavern, Lucille's, Al Dente), cafés (Columbus Café & Co, Mercanti, Melk), bars (Typhoon, Ye Olde Orchard), a health food store (Fleur Sauvage), food stores (Le Maître Boucher, Première Moisson), unique boutiques (Kidlink, 101 artisans, Espace Tricot... ) and a dance school (Les Ateliers Turcotte).

In the summer of 2013 the Monkland Merchants Association organized a successful street Festival that attracted more than 90,000 people over a three-day period. Between 2014 and 2017, Monkland Avenue boasted one of the city's largest street festivals lasting 3 days and attracting more than 250,000 attendees, over 20 food trucks and 50 independent merchants.

2013 also marked the arrival of new third wave coffee shop, Melk.

2015 marked the arrival of new merchants such as Café Di Mercanti, LE Cheese (now closed), Casa de Mateo (now closed), Food De Toi (now closed), Bistro Amerigo, and Bacaro Pizzeria.
