= James Monk =

American lawyer

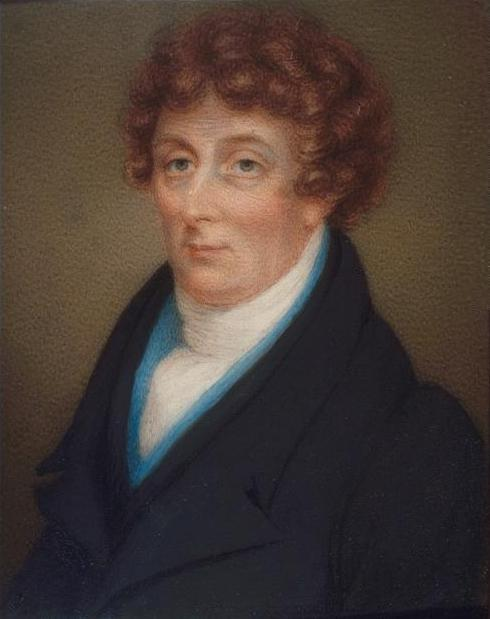
Portrait of Sir James Monk

Sir James Monk (1745 – November 18, 1826) was Chief Justice of the District of Montreal in Lower Canada. Monk played a significant role in the abolition of slavery in British North America, when as Chief Justice he rendered a series of decisions regarding escaped slaves that 'while not technically abolishing slavery rendered it innocuous' (i.e. unenforceable). 'The slave could not be compelled to serve longer than he would, and ... might leave his master at will.'

== Early life ==
James Monk was born in 1745 at Boston, Massachusetts, and christened at King's Chapel. He was the son of Judge James Monk (1717-1768) of Halifax, Nova Scotia and his wife Ann, daughter of Henry Deering of Boston. Sir James Monk was a grandson of George Monk (b.1666) of Blatchingley, who was one of the three illegitimate sons of George Monck, 1st Duke of Albemarle. James was educated in Halifax where his father had settled in 1749. He studied law with his father from 1761 to 1767 and was admitted to the bar in 1768. After his father died leaving the family in debt, Monk took over the family's finances. In 1771, he studied law in London and on the recommendation of Lord Hillsborough he was appointed Solicitor-General of Nova Scotia in 1772, while continuing his law studies in London. In 1774, he married Ann Elizabeth Adams of St James's Street, London, who was said to be 'well connected'.

== Return to Nova Scotia ==
In September, 1774, Monk took up his position as Solicitor-General at Halifax. Enjoying the support of Lord Dartmouth, he quickly won the support of Governor Francis Legge and by December was acting Attorney-General in the place of William Nesbitt. In 1775, he was elected to the Nova Scotia House of Assembly for Yarmouth Township, taking his seat June 15, 1775, but his seat was declared vacant June 28, 1776 for non-attendance. During the American Revolution he took an active part in anti-revolutionary activity in Nova Scotia.

== Career at Quebec ==
Neither of Monk's posts were salaried, and as the executor of Governor Francis Legge's policies Monk was unpopular with Nova Scotian officials. This led to George Germain, 1st Viscount Sackville, appointing Monk Attorney-General of Lower Canada in 1776. This move did not make things easier for Monk as Germain had placed him over Governor Guy Carleton, 1st Baron Dorchester's choice, William Grant, affecting the lucrative private practice that Carleton enjoyed with Quebec's merchants. Monk was kept out of Carleton's inner circle, but his friendship with Chief Justice Peter Livius led to his appointment in 1778 to Judge of the Vice-Admiralty Court, a position he held for ten years.

Monk had avoided open conflict with Governor Carleton, but this did not last with Carleton's successor, Sir Frederick Haldimand who objected to Monk's opposition between policy and legality. Haldimand resurrected the dormant post of Solicitor-General to avoid having to call on Monk. In 1784, Monk lamented to his wife, "If I act with Law & Constitution legal & political I am to be . . . ruined by a Governor – If I act against them I surely shall be ruined by Ministry who will screen their Gov` under . . . my disgrace!"

Ironically, in 1786 Monk was saved by Governor Carleton who had returned to succeed Haldimand. He now acted in a private capacity as the attorney to Quebec's merchants and forcefully opposed a bill, sponsored by the French Party, that had been passed by the Council for the Affairs of the Province of Quebec to extend the use of French civil law in the province, which in Lord Dorchester’s words was "granting by favor to one what they refused to another."

== Career ==
Monk served as solicitor general of Nova Scotia and was appointed attorney general of Quebec in 1776 serving until 1789 and then again from 1792 to 1794. In 1794 he was appointed Chief Justice of the King's Bench of Montreal. During his career Monk also served on Executive and Legislative Councils and Nova Scotia's Legislative Assembly. Monk was knighted in 1825 and in 1826, he would die at his home in Cheltenham, England at the age of 81. Monkland Avenue in Montreal is named for him. The Monk Metro Station and the Monk Boulevard are named for the Monk family, especially Frederick D. Monk, an attorney who along with Joseph-Ulric Émard purchased land belonging to the Davidson family in order to develop it, the area became Ville Émard.

== Namesakes ==
Monkland Avenue in Montreal is named for him. The home that he built in 1804, Monklands, still stands today as the central building of the Villa Maria School, in Montreal.
