= Henry Allcock =

Canadian judge

Henry Allcock (baptised 26 January 1759 – 22 February 1808) was a judge and political figure in Upper and Lower Canada.

His family was from Edgbaston and he was born in Birmingham, England in 1759 and studied law at Lincoln's Inn in London. He was called to the bar in 1791. In 1798, he was appointed judge in the Court of King's Bench of Upper Canada. In 1800, he was elected to the 3rd Parliament of Upper Canada representing Durham, Simcoe and 1st York. However, a petition was raised citing irregularities on the part of his agent and he was unseated. Angus Macdonell won the seat in a by-election.

He presided over the trial of John Small for the murder of John White in a duel in 1800, resulting in Small's acquittal; in 1801, he presided over the trial of Mary Osborn, the first woman to be executed in Upper Canada. In 1802, he became chief justice for Upper Canada succeeding John Elmsley and, in 1803, he was appointed to the Executive Council for the province.

In 1805, he became Chief Justice of Lower Canada and a member of the Executive Council of Lower Canada despite support for another candidate, Jonathan Sewell, by the upper class of the province and the lieutenant governor. He was named speaker for the Legislative Council of Lower Canada in January 1808.

He died of a fever at Quebec City in 1808, while in office.

== Bibliography ==
- "Biography". Dictionnaire des parlementaires du Québec de 1792 à nos jours (in French). National Assembly of Quebec.
- "ALLCOCK, HENRY," by Frederick H. Armstrong, Dictionary of Canadian Biography, vol. 5, University of Toronto/Université Laval, 2003–

Legal offices
Preceded by John Elmsley; 1796–1802	Chief Justice of Upper Canada; 1802–1806	Succeeded by Thomas Scott

Legal offices
Preceded by John Elmsley; 1802–1805	Chief Justice of Lower Canada; 1805–1808	Succeeded by Jonathan Sewell
