= Thomas Dunn (lieutenant-governor) =

Canadian politician

Thomas Dunn (1729 – 15 April 1818) was the Lieutenant-Governor of Lower Canada from 1805 to 1807.

He was born in Durham, England, and came to the town of Quebec shortly after its surrender in 1760. With his partner, John Gray, he obtained the trading lease to the king's posts, which gave them a monopoly in the fur trade and fishing on the north coast of the Saint Lawrence River. Dunn also purchased the seigneury of Mille-Vaches.

Dunn was also the owner of the Cape Diamond Brewery at Quebec City. He was appointed to the Executive Council of the Province of Quebec (1764–1774) and served as a member of the Legislative Council of Quebec from 1775 to 1791.

He married at age 54 Henriette Guichaud (widow of the Quebec merchant Pierre Fargues) in 1783 and died at Quebec City aged 89. Three sons were born of their union: Thomas and William, who would both pursue military careers, and Robert.

Government offices
Preceded by Sir Robert Milnes, Bt	Governor General of British North America; 1805–1807	Succeeded by Sir James Henry Craig
