= Sir Robert Milnes, 1st Baronet =

British Army officer and colonial administrator

Sir Robert Shore Milnes Bt
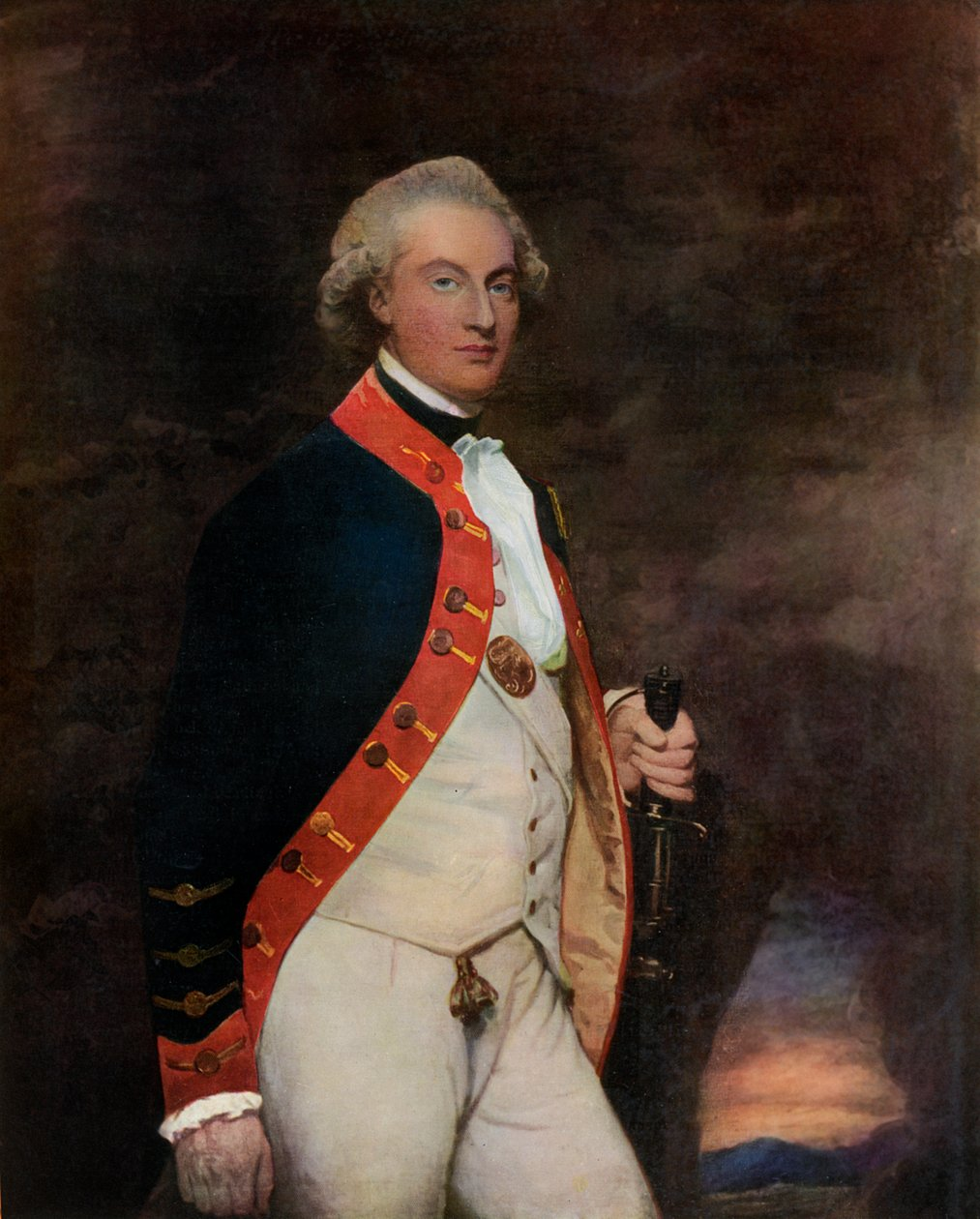
- Portrait by George Romney

Personal details
- Born: 1754
- Died: 2 December 1837 (aged 82–83)
- Spouse: Charlotte Frances Bentinck

Sir Robert Shore Milnes, 1st Baronet (1754 – 2 December 1837) was a British Army officer and colonial administrator who served as the Lieutenant Governor of Lower Canada from 1799 to 1805. Milnes served in the Royal Horse Guards and retired as Captain in 1788.

He married Charlotte Frances Bentinck, daughter of Captain John Bentinck and Renira van Tuyll van Serooskerken, on 12 November 1785. Milnes died at Tunbridge Wells, England.

Government offices
Preceded by Robert Prescott	Governor-General of The Canadas; 1799–1805	Succeeded by Thomas Dunn
Baronetage of the United Kingdom
New creation	Baronet (of Gauley); 1801–1837	Succeeded by John Bentinck Milnes
