= Jacob Mountain =

English priest (1749–1825)

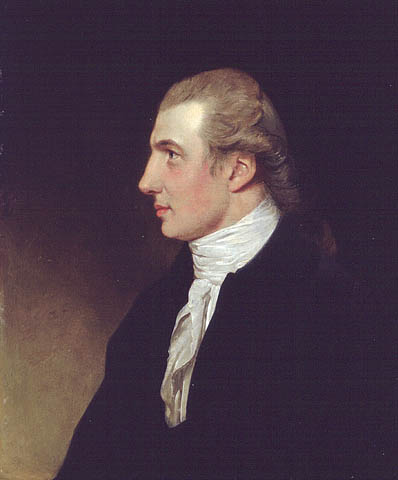

1st Anglican Bishop of Quebec
- In office 1793–1825
- Succeeded by: Charles Stewart

Member of the Legislative Council of Upper Canada
- In office 1793–1825

Member of the Legislative Council of Lower Canada
- In office 1793–1825

Personal details
- Born: 1 December 1749 Thwaite Hall, Norfolk, England
- Died: 16 June 1825 (aged 75) Marchmont House, Lower Canada
- Spouse: Elizabeth Mildred Wale Kentish
- Education: Caius College, Cambridge

Jacob Mountain (1 December 1749 – 16 June 1825) was an English priest who was appointed the first Anglican Bishop of Quebec. He served also on both the Legislative Council of Lower Canada and the Legislative Council of Upper Canada.

== Biography ==
The second son of Jacob Mountain (1710–1752), of Thwaite Hall, Norfolk, and his third wife, Ann, daughter of Jehoshaphat Postle of Colney Hall, near Wymondham, chairman of the Norfolk Agricultural Association. The first son of Jacob Sr, and Jacob's Jr.'s brother, was named Jehoshaphat Mountain.

According to some sources Mountain was related to Michel de Montaigne via his great-grandfather, who also resided at Château de Montaigne, and whose family fled from France after the revocation of the Edict of Nantes.

The younger Jacob Mountain was born at Thwaite Hall on 1 December 1749. He was educated at various Norfolk schools, including Scarning, where he was a pupil of the classicist Robert Potter (1721–1804), and at Caius College, Cambridge, where he graduated BA in 1774 and MA 1777. In 1779 he was elected a fellow of his college, and, after holding the living of St Andrew's Church, Norwich, was presented to the vicarages of Holbeach, Lincolnshire, and Buckden, Huntingdonshire, which he held together. On 1 June 1788, he was installed as Castor prebendary in Lincoln Cathedral. He was consecrated at Lambeth Palace on 7 July 1793, and at the same time was awarded the honorary degree of Doctor of Divinity (DD; jure dignitatis). These preferments he owed to the friendship of William Pitt the Younger, who also, on the recommendation of George Pretyman Tomline, gave him the appointment of first Anglican Bishop of Quebec in 1793.

At that time there were only nine clergymen of the Church of England in The Canadas — at his death there were 61. For 30 years Mountain promoted missions and the erection of churches in all populous places, which he visited regularly, into old age. He also built the Anglican Cathedral of the Holy Trinity in Quebec City.

Jacob Mountain died at Marchmont House, Lower Canada, 16 June 1825 and was buried under the chancel of Holy Trinity Cathedral, which also contains a monument to his memory.

== Works ==
Jacob Mountain published Poetical Reveries, 1777, besides sermons and charges.

== Family ==
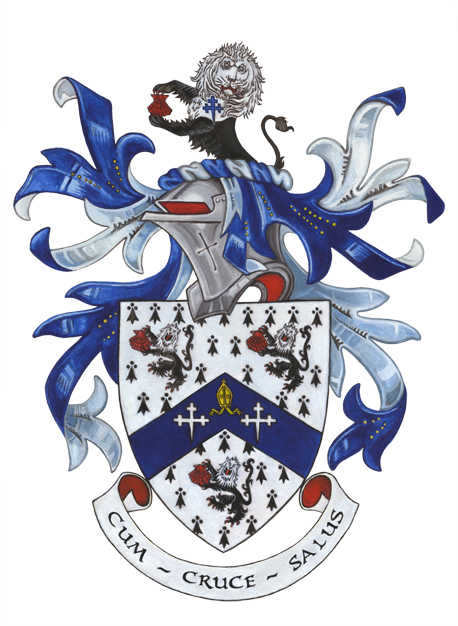
Coat of Arms of Jacob Mountain

In 1783, Jacob Mountain married Elizabeth Mildred Wale Kentish (d. 1836), daughter and co-heiress of Thomas Woolley Kentish of Little Bardfield Hall, near Braintree, Essex. The Mountains lived at Marchmont House, Quebec City, where he died, and they were the parents of six surviving children.

- Jacob Henry Brooke Mountain (1788–1872) of The Heath, Hertfordshire, vicar of Hemel Hempstead, Hertfordshire and rector of Blunham, Bedfordshire. His first wife, Frances Mingay Brooke (d. 1837), was the daughter and co-heiress of William Brooke of Swainsthorpe Hall, Norfolk. His second wife, also named Frances (d. 1876), was the daughter of John Osmond Deakin and widow of Frederick Polhill, M.P. (1798–1848), of Howbury Park, Bedfordshire.
- George Mountain (1789-1863), third Bishop of Quebec, first principal of McGill University and the founder of Bishop's University. In 1814 at Quebec City, he married Mary Hume Thomson (1789–1861), daughter of Commissary-General William Thomson of Quebec, and the aunt of Jasper Hume Nicolls, of Lennoxville, Quebec.
- George Robert Mountain (1791–1846), formerly of the 75th Regiment and afterwards rector of Havant, Hampshire. He married Katherine Hinchliff, of Mitcham, Surrey.
- Elizabeth Sarah Mountain (1793–1843), married Frederick Arabin (colonel RA), of Moyglare, County Westmeath, Ireland.
- Colonel Armine Simcoe Henry Mountain (1797–1854), adjutant-general to the forces in India and China, and aide-de-camp to Queen Victoria. His first wife was Jane O'Beirne (d. 1838), granddaughter of Thomas O'Beirne, Bishop of Meath. His second wife, Charlotte, was the daughter of Thomas Dundas of Fingask (a major-general; 1750–1794), of Carron Hall, nephew of James Maitland, 7th Earl of Lauderdale. Armine's widow remarried John Henry Lefroy.
- Charlotte Mary Milnes Mountain (1801–1860), died unmarried at her brother's house in Havant.

== Coat of arms ==
The arms of Jacob Mountain were granted by the English Kings of Arms on 3 August 1793. He bore "Ermine on a chevron Azure between three lions rampant guardant Sable each supporting between the fore-paws an escallop erect Gules a mitre on each side a cross crosslet fitchy Argent."

== Sources ==
- "Biography". Dictionnaire des parlementaires du Québec de 1792 à nos jours (in French). National Assembly of Quebec.
- Heraldic America
- This article incorporates text from a publication now in the public domain: Boase, George Clement (1894). "Mountain, Jacob". In Lee, Sidney (ed.). Dictionary of National Biography. Vol. 39. London: Smith, Elder & Co.
