= Timeline of Quebec history (1760–1790) =

Quebec's history between 1760 and 1790

This section of the timeline of Quebec history concerns the events between the fall of Quebec as part of New France during the French and Indian Wars and as part of British North America, through the adoption of the Quebec Act (1774), until just before the division of the province into Upper and Lower Canada by the Constitutional Act (1791).

== 1760s ==
- 1760: The British defeat the French at the Battle of Sainte-Foy on the Plains of Abraham on April 26.
- 1760: French forces lay siege to Quebec City but fail to capture the city from British forces.
- 1760: On May 9, British ships arrive at Quebec City, forcing the French army back to Montreal.
- 1760: The Battle of Restigouche in what is now the Province of New Brunswick, is the last battle between France and Britain for possession of Canada during the Seven Years' War.
- 1760: July to September, British conduct a three pronged attack on Montreal
- 1760: On September 8, Montreal capitulates. Governor Vaudreuil surrenders to the British army on the terms of a treaty of capitulation. See Articles of Capitulation of Montreal.
- 1760: The British puts Canada under a military regime while awaiting the results of the Seven Years' War in Europe.
- 1763: The Seven Years' War ends with the signing of the Treaty of Paris on February 10. France gives the northerly portion of New France to the British in favour of keeping Guadeloupe.
- 1763: Hanging of Marie-Josephte Corriveau on April 18, for the murder of her second husband.
- 1763: In May, Indian Chief Pontiac leads a series of raids against British trade posts.
- 1763: With the October 7 Royal Proclamation by the British Parliament, the area then referred to by the natives as Canada is renamed the Province of Quebec.
- 1763: James Murray is made governor of the Province of Quebec on November 21.
- 1764: William Brown and Thomas Gilmore publish the first edition of The Quebec Gazette / La Gazette de Québec on June 21.
- 1764: On September 17, the civil courts are established, ending the military rule of the Province of Quebec which had been in place during the Seven Years' War.
- 1764: The Government in Great Britain denies the request by British colonial merchants that the French civil code be replaced by British common law and that a House of Assembly be created for Anglophone Protestants alone.
- 1764: On October 29, 94 "Canadien" merchants submit a first petition requesting that the orders of the King be available in the French language and that they be allowed to participate in the government.
- 1764: Exiled Acadians are permitted to return to Nova Scotia.
- 1765: The population of the Province of Quebec is 69,810.
- 1768: On October 26, Guy Carleton, later baron of Dorchester, becomes governor of the province of Quebec.

== 1770s ==
- 1773: In October and November, British and French speaking merchants of the Colonial Province of Quebec submit petitions to the Parliament of Great Britain requesting a legislative assembly.
- 1773: In December, French speaking landlords of the Colonial Province of Quebec submit a petition and a memoir to the Parliament of Great Britain requesting they be granted the same rights and privileges of the other British subjects.
- 1774: On June 13, the British Parliament enacts the Quebec Act, which is given Royal Assent on June 22. The Act will be effective as of May 1, 1775.
- 1774: The First Continental Congress issues its Declaration and Resolves condemning the Quebec Act for creating a Roman Catholic province without a representative government. It also issues an open letter to the inhabitants of Canada, inviting them to elect representatives for the second meeting of the Continental Congress.
- 1775: Green Mountain Boys under Ethan Allen and Benedict Arnold take Fort Ticonderoga on May 9, Fort Crown Point on May 11, and raid Fort Saint-Jean on May 18.
- 1775: On May 22, Monsieur Jean-Olivier Briand writes a mandement inviting the Catholics of the Province of Quebec to ignore the invitation of the rebels of the south and defend their country and their king.
- 1775: On May 29, the Second Continental Congress writes a second open letter inviting the people of Canada to join in the American Revolution.
- 1775: The Continental Army under Richard Montgomery invades Quebec, arriving at Île-aux-Noix on September 4, and besieging Fort Saint-Jean on September 17.
- 1775: Fort Saint-Jean surrenders on November 3, and Montreal capitulates to the Patriots on November 13.
- 1775: The troops of Richard Montgomery and Benedict Arnold are defeated before Quebec City on December 31.
- 1776: With French Canadians such as Clément Gosselin joining the Patriot cause, Congress authorizes the 1st and 2nd Canadian Regiments of the Continental Army
- 1776: 10,000 British and German troops arrive in May and drive the Continental Army out of the province.
- 1776: United States Declaration of Independence adopted on July 4.
- 1778: Frederick Haldimand replaces General Guy Carleton as governor of Quebec.
- 1778: In the spring, the Gazette du Commerce et Littéraire pour la Ville et District de Montréal is founded in Montreal by the French printer Fleury Mesplet.
- 1779: On June 2, The publishing of the Gazette Littéraire is stopped.
- 1779: Fleury Mesplet and Valentin Jautard are arrested by order of the governor on June 4.

== 1780s ==
- 1781: The British are defeated at Yorktown, ending major revolutionary war hostilities in North America. Major Clément Gosselin, a Canadian from La Pocatière, along with other Canadians in the 2nd Canadian Regiment, and Admiral Louis-Philippe de Vaudreuil, who is the nephew of Pierre Vaudreuil of Montreal, participate.
- 1783: Arrival of the first of 8,000 United Empire Loyalists who settle mainly in Cataraqui (Kingston, Ontario). The Haldimand Collection provides first hand information regarding the arrival and settlement of Loyalists in Canada. See Haldimand Collection
- 1783: Fleury Mesplet gets out of prison in September.
- 1784: The population of the Province of Quebec is 113,012.
- 1784: A group of 2291 colonial petitioners formally request that the Parliament of Britain create of a House of Assembly for the Province of Quebec for all citizens without regard to nationality or religion.
- 1785: Fleury Mesplet founds the newspaper The Montreal Gazette / Gazette de Montréal on August 28.
- 1786: John Molson founds the Molson Breweries.
- 1789: On October 20, William Wyndham Grenville writes a confidential letter to Lord Dorchester in which he recommends that the latter make concessions regarding the government of the Province of Quebec rather than letting things go until the residents of the colony rebel.

== See also ==
- History of Quebec
- History of North America
- Constitutional history of Canada

Preceded by 1663 to 1759	Timeline of Quebec history 1760 to 1790	Succeeded by 1791 to 1840
