= Pierre du Calvet =

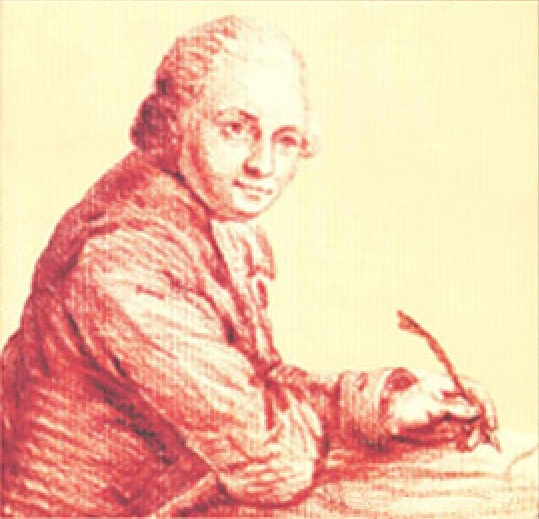
- Born: 1735; Caussade, Kingdom of France
- Died: March 28, 1786; Lost at sea
- Occupations: trader, justice of the peace

Pierre du Calvet (1735 – March 28, 1786) was a Montreal trader, justice of the peace, political prisoner and epistle writer of French Huguenot origin.

== Biography ==
=== Family ===
Pierre du Calvet was born in the summer of 1735 in Caussade in the French province of Guyenne (today the Tarn-et-Garonne département). He was the oldest of a family of five children. His father, Pierre Calvet, of Calvinist confession, had his children baptized as Catholics. He however passed on his Protestant faith to them. His mother was Anne Boudet. His family is said to be of noble origin and owned a domain at Montalzat, north of Toulouse.

An ancestor, François Calvet, was hanged on June 23, 1563, for introducing the Reform in Montauban.

=== Education ===
He received a Catholic education without renouncing his Calvinism. Judging from his writings, he certainly studied the Humanities, French law, the Law of Nations and the philosophy of his time, that of the Enlightenment. In the main epistle of his Appel à la Justice de l'État, he quotes long excerpts from Pufendorf, Gratian, Grotius, Locke, and Machiavelli.

=== Emigration to New France ===
A cousin-in-law, Mr. Guireaud, provided him with the capital needed to purchase the goods he intended to trade in New France. Du Calvet thus embarked for Quebec City on board the merchant ship Le Lion, which left Bordeaux in April 1758. His boat was shipwrecked about 100 miles from Quebec. His cargo lost, he was forced to find employment on his arrival in the capital of Canada towards mid-June.

On behalf of the government of New France, he was store keeper at Miramichi and Restigouche in Acadia. He was responsible to provide for the needs of three to four thousand Acadians deported by the British government in 1755. He remained there until autumn 1759.

In the summer of 1759, he took part to a mission to transfer British war prisoners to Halifax under officer Jean-François Bourdon de Dombourg. Lieutenant William Caesar McCormick, who was a prisoner captured in the Petitcodiac River Campaign, wrote him a letter of appreciation dated August 28 for the good care given to all the prisoners. On September 10, he was also given a certificate recognizing the humane treatment of the said prisoners.

Du Calvet thereafter left for Montreal after having learned, while passing through Quebec City, that the Vaudreuil government had removed there following the city's capitulation. He remained in Montreal until January 1760.

He was again charged with a mission in Acadia, this time to perform a population census on the Acadians and determine ways to provide assistance to them. He left Montreal on January 18, at the head of a group of some 60 Acadians and a few Amerindian guides. With him was the commander in chief of French Acadia, Mr. Boishébert. Upon his return, he was almost immediately sent to Sainte-Foy for the last important battle between the French and British Armies before the capitulation and surrender of Montreal on September 8. He left for Quebec City on April 20, accompanying the expedition commanded by de Lévis. In a letter to his father date June 28, du Cavet recites the historic battle and the subsequent siege. The siege was lift up on May 16, and du Calvet returned to Montreal with everyone else still alive.

Following the capitulation of the government of New France on September 8, 1760, he remained in Montreal. During the winter, he met with William Caesar McCormick again and was recommended to General Jeffery Amherst by him. Du Calvet, was determined to return to Europe and consequently was in need to get to Quebec to obtain a passport from governor James Murray, not without first obtaining another passport from governor Thomas Gage to be authorized to leave the district of Montreal. Governor Murray however requested that du Calvet delays his departure to go on yet another mission in Acadia. His task was to count the number of Acadians still left in Acadia and offer them to be transported safely to Quebec. This last humanitarian mission, which he accepted, kept him busy from July to October 1761. It seems he abandoned his project to return to Europe afterward because in January 1762, he was in Montreal.

=== Trader and Justice of the Peace ===
In January 1762, he settled in Montreal where he finally started his import-export business. He exported corn and peltries which he loaded aboard the trading vessels of the Watson & Rashleigh company (Brook Watson and Robert Rashleigh) bound for England and Spain. In return he imported various goods from Europe such as spirits and products for domestic use. His trade was prosperous. Between 1772 and 1776, he exported approximately 35,000 minots of corn, 800 pea minots plus some peltries, and imported great quantities of goods which he sold off in the district of Montreal. On March 3, 1774, he purchased the seigniory of Rivière-David, close to Sorel.

In 1763, he learned of the death of one of his uncles living in South Carolina and two months later that of his father in France.

In the summer of 1764, he left the province of Quebec for London from where he dealt with the succession of his uncle. He then passed to France to sell the family domain of Montalzat. He only came back to Montreal in June 1766. During his absence, Jean Dumas-Saint-Martin and Pierre Jusseaume dit Saint-Pierre conducted his private affairs in America. During this long voyage in Europe, he made several contacts in the English-speaking world. Even if his English was defective, he was well received a little everywhere, helped as he was with invaluable letters of introductions from governor Murray. Amongst others, he met the governor's brother, Lord Elibank, who resided at Greenock in Scotland. In London, he met with George Montagu-Dunk, 2nd Earl of Halifax, British Secretary of State for the Southern Department.

In Paris, he landed with letters of introductions for Francis Seymour-Conway, 1st Marquess of Hertford, the British Ambassador to France and his secretary, David Hume, the already famous philosopher, who both interceded in his favour before the Comte de Saint-Florentin. All this support was necessary for him to ensure the liquidation of his succession because he was Protestant and the French laws were then unfavourable to non-Catholics. In January 1766, after a year-long sojourn, the business was over with and he went back to London. In the Spring, he embarked for Quebec on board a vessel named the General Conway.

On June 23, 1766, governor Murray appointed him Justice of the Peace at the new Court of Common Pleas for the district of Montreal. Hardly just returned, he again left Canada, in November, to deal with trade matters in England, and only returned home in April 1767, called by his duty of Justice of the Peace.

Du Calvet seemed to have put a great zeal in the exercise of his public duties and was soon praised by the Chief Justice the province, William Hey. He handled a very great number of causes and did not ask for any fees at all.

=== Marriage ===
On October 3, 1771, at 36 years of age, he married Marie-Louise Jusseaume. 20 years old, she was the daughter of his friend Pierre Jusseaume and Marie-Louise Boulay-dit-Boulet. The new couple settled in a city house at the corner of Saint-Paul and Bonsecours streets. A first child, a boy, was born July 7, 1772. The small Jean-Pierre died in early age on the coming August 31. On November 8, 1773, Marie-Louise gave birth to a second boy, whom they name Jean Dumas, in honour of the child's godfather Jean Dumas Saint-Pierre. The couple had a third boy on October 16, 1774. He was named Guy, in honour of governor Guy Carleton. Sadly, this last child died on May 11, having had one too difficult winter. The mother joined her first and her last in the tomb in December of the same year.

Du Calvet found a nurse, dame La Prise, to take care of Jean Dumas, his second son.

=== Political engagement ===
In 1769, he submitted a reform plan to the new governor Guy Carleton which aimed for the uniformisation of the administration of justice in the province of Quebec. The new administrative measures promulgated on February 1 did not satisfy him and he continued to voice for reform thereafter. He wrote a few open letters which he published in the Quebec Gazette/Gazette de Québec, the only newspaper in the colony at the time.

On October 28, 1770, he submitted the Secretary of State for the Colonies, Wills Hill, Earl of Hillsborough, a memoir entitled Mémoire sur la forme judiciaire actuelle de la Province de Québec.

His public denunciation of the abuses of justice by certain judges among his colleagues attracted him both friends and enemies. His actions for the improvement of the system and administration of justice were praised by Governor Carleton, attorney general Francis Maseres and Chief Justice William Hey. He however was placed at odds with a few fellow-members in the magistracy, including his neighbour John Fraser, as well as Edward Southouse and René-Ovide Hertel de Rouville.

John Fraser, captain of 60th British Royal Regiment, became Justice of the Peace in 1765, shortly after being released, for lack of evidence, in a case of violence involving him and merchant Thomas Walker, friend of du Calvet, who on September 6, 1764, lost an ear during an assault on his person. According to du Calvet, John Fraser entertained animosity towards him from this period. On June 29, 1771, Fraser and du Calvet engaged in a fist fight in front of du Calvet's house, that is opposite that of Fraser.

=== American Revolutionary War ===
On October 26, the first Continental Congress addressed a letter to the inhabitants of the province in which the form of government given to the people by the Quebec Act was severely criticized. The people were invited to give themselves the provincial representation the Quebec Act did not provide for, and have this representative body send delegates to the upcoming continental Congress, to be held in Philadelphia on May 10, 1775.

In the climate of high suspicion that precedes the entry of the Congress's army on the territory of the province of Quebec, many citizens were arrested and among them was du Calvet. Joseph Simon Léonard, officer of militia at Pointe-aux-Trembles, accused du Calvet of collaboration with the "rebels". On October 6, his case was heard before the court and on October 9 a jury rejected the accusation as unfounded.

On November 13, Montreal was taken by the army of Brigadier General Richard Montgomery without a fight. Du Calvet was part of a committee of citizens who greeted the representatives of the Continental Congress with an address, written by Valentin Jautard on November 14. During the 6-month long occupation of Montreal by the Congress' armies, du Calvet's stores were under requisition for the service of the army.

On May 6, British reinforcements commanded by John Burgoyne arrived at Quebec. The Congress' troops were defeated at Trois-Rivières on June 8, and on June 15, Benedict Arnold withdrew his men from the province of Quebec. Before leaving the country, the army of the Congress had delivered du Calvet promissory notes of reimbursement which he later used to claim back 56,394 pounds to the Congress.

Frederick Haldimand was appointed to replace Guy Carleton in the spring of 1777 and landed in the province's capital on June 26, 1778. A month before, Fleury Mesplet had founded the first newspaper of Montreal and the first French-only one in the history of Quebec as well. Pierre du Calvet continued his public denunciation of the administration of justice by publishing open letters in it.

On May 26, he published an open denunciation of his colleagues Edward Southouse and René-Ovide Hertel de Rouville. James Monk, the attorney general, sued du Calvet for libel. He was defended by lawyer William Dummer Powell and acquitted by a jury declaring no grounds for the accusation.

=== Political prisoner ===
On September 27, 1780, brigadier general Allan Maclean proceeded to arrest du Calvet. He was incarcerated during three years, from September 27, 1780, to May 2, 1783. From the first day of his arrest, he never ceased to claim his innocence and requested that a legal trial be given to him.

On December 6, 1780, a little over a month after his arrest, governor Haldimand accepted the request for the release of du Calvet which legislative councillor François Lévesque had submitted him. The Governor however changed his mind the day after.

On May 2, 1783, he was finally released from prison.

=== Appel à la Justice de l'État and death ===
Out of prison, du Calvet left the continent for London where he intended to put governor Haldimand to trial for violating the British constitution.

In March 1784, he published The Case of Peter du Calvet to let his cause be known to the English public. Not conversant in the English language, he received the help of Francis Maseres and Petier Livius to write the document, which contains a detailed account of his confrontation with judge Fraser, his arrest, sequestration, his numerous letters asking to be trialled before a jury of his peers, etc.

In July, he published Appel à la Justice de l'État, a collection of letters to British officials and to the people of Quebec, intended to inform them of his actions to obtain both justice in his personal cause and a new constitution for the province.

The same year, Félix de Berey, mocked by du Calvet in one of his open letters, published Réplique par le P. de Berey aux calomnies de Pierre du Calvet.

To finance his lawsuit against Haldimand, he needed money. While in London he decided to cross the Atlantic to reach Philadelphia and recover the money owed to him by the American Congress. He presented himself before the Congressmen to claim the amount he believed was his, but was paid back only parts of it. On March 3, the Spanish ship transporting him to Paris left the port of New York. On March 15, the Spanish ship was declared lost in sea.

== Political heritage ==
While the trial of Haldimand never took place, the actions taken by du Calvet had a decisive influence on the course of Quebec's history. He undoubtedly contributed to the involvement of citizens, French-speaking and English-speaking, Catholic and Protestant, in a common effort to obtain a House of Assembly for the province of Quebec. Indeed, a few months after the probable arrival of the first copies of his collection of letters, numerous persons were signing the Petition of Ancient and New Subjects for a House of Assembly dated November 24, 1784.

Louis-Joseph Papineau evoked his memory in his last public speech at the Institut canadien de Montréal in December 1867. Like numerous others of his generation, he knew the story of du Calvet.

In 1877, Louis Fréchette dedicated a poem entitled Du Calvet in his collection of poems La Légende d'un peuple. Relating in verse the story of his fight, he made him a national hero, the "first champion of our civic battles".

Éva Circé-Côté dedicated chapter V of her book Papineau - Son influence sur la pensée canadienne to "the one who inaugurated the most glorious period of our annals".

== Works ==
- Mémoire sur la forme judiciaire actuelle de la Province de Québec, Quebec City, 1770
- Province de Québec, district de Montréal, Cour des plaidoyers communs, Brook Watson & Robert Rashleigh, négociants de Londres, stipulant pour eux, Pierre Panet, écuyer, fondé de leur procuration, demandeurs contre Pierre du calvet, de Montréal, écuyer, défendeur : défenses, 1778
- Mémoire en réponse à l'écrit public, de Me Panet, fondé de procuration de Watson & Rasleigh de Londres, demandeurs, contre Pierre du Calvet de Montréal, écuyer, défendeur [...], Quebec City, 1779
- The Case of Peter Du Calvet, Esq., of Montreal in the Province of Quebeck, containing, amongst other things worth notice, an account of the long and severe imprisonment he suffered in the said province [...], London, March 1784 (in collaboration with Francis Maseres and Peter Livius)
- Appel à la justice de l’État; ou recueil de lettres au roi, au prince de Galles, et aux ministres; avec une lettre à messieurs les Canadiens, ..., London, July 1784

== See also ==
- Frederick Haldimand
- Fleury Mesplet
- Valentin Jautard
- Michel Bastarache dit Basque
