= The Gazette (Montreal) =

Canadian daily newspaper in Quebec

- The December 1, 2023, front page of The Gazette
- Type: Daily newspaper
- Format: Broadsheet
- Owner: Postmedia Network
- Founder: Fleury Mesplet
- Editor-in-chief: Marilena Lucci
- Managing editor: Jeff Blond
- Founded: June 3, 1778
- Relaunched: August 25, 1785
- Language: English
- Headquarters: 2055, rue Peel; Suite 700; Montreal, Quebec; H3A 1V4
- Circulation: 101,761 daily 116,005 Saturday (as of 2013)
- ISSN: 0384-1294
- OCLC number: 456824368
- Website: montrealgazette.com

The Gazette, also known as the Montreal Gazette, is a Canadian English-language broadsheet daily newspaper which is owned by Postmedia Network. It is published in Montreal, Quebec, Canada.

It is the only English-language daily newspaper currently published in Montreal. Three other daily English-language newspapers shuttered at various times during the second half of the 20th century. It is one of the French-speaking province's last two English-language dailies; the other is the Sherbrooke Record, which serves the anglophone community in Sherbrooke and the Eastern Townships southeast of Montreal.

Founded in 1778 by Fleury Mesplet, The Gazette is Quebec's oldest daily newspaper and the oldest continuously published newspaper in Canada.

== History ==
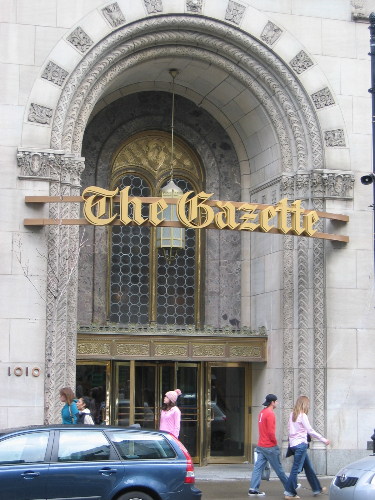
Former offices in the Dominion Square Building on Saint Catherine Street

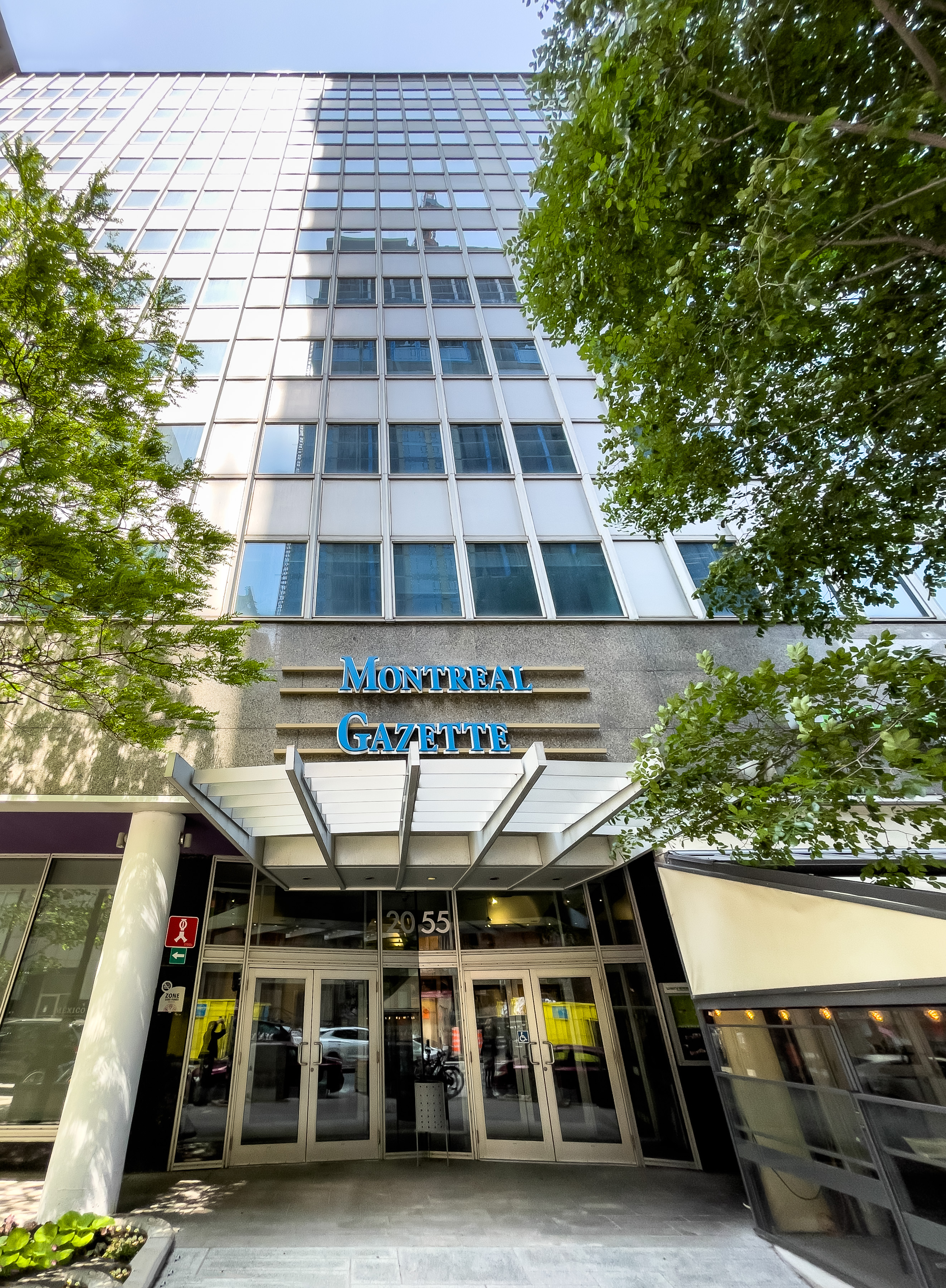
Offices on Peel Street

Fleury Mesplet founded a French-language weekly newspaper called La Gazette du commerce et littéraire, pour la ville et district de Montréal on June 3, 1778. It was the first entirely French-language newspaper in Canada. The paper did not accept advertising aside for the various books that Mesplet also published. The articles were meant to promote discussion, and it focused on literature and philosophy, as well as various anecdotal articles, poems and letters. Benjamin Franklin encouraged Mesplet to found the newspaper to persuade Canadians to join the American Revolution. A secret resolution of Congress dispatched Mesplat and his printing equipment to Canada in February 1776 "to establish a free press...for the frequent publication of such pieces as may be of service to the cause of the United Colonies." Mesplet, an immigrant from France, had previously lived in Philadelphia and supported the Americans when they occupied Montreal during the war. The newspaper was shut down in 1779 when Mesplet and the editor, Valentin Jautard, were arrested for sedition and imprisoned for three years.

Mesplet began a second weekly, The Montreal Gazette / La Gazette de Montréal, on August 25, 1785, which had a dual French-English bilingual format similar to that used by the Quebec Gazette. Its offices were located in the house of Joseph Lemoyne de Longueuil on rue de la Capitale. French columns were in the left-hand column and English columns in the right-hand column. The columns were originally written in French and translated to English by Valentin Jautard, who served as editor until his death in 1787. The columns were mostly on education, religion, and literature, and after 1788 on politics. Foreign and local news made up the rest of the paper. The paper took a Voltairian and anticlerical stance, wanted Quebec to have its own legislative assembly and sought to import the principles of the French Revolution to Quebec. The newspaper also introduced advertising and announcements, taking up half of four pages. It is the direct ancestor of the current newspaper. The newspaper did well, and Mesplet's operation moved to Notre-Dame Street in 1787. Mesplet continued to operate the newspaper until his death in 1794.

Following Mesplet's death, his widow published the newspaper for several issues, but the paper ceased publication soon after. Two rivals, Louis Roy and Edward Edwards fought over the right to publish the newspaper over the course of two years. Edwards eventually won the printing press and newspaper and continued operations until his assets were seized in 1808. The newspaper was then the property of James Brown for fourteen years. In 1822, it was sold to businessman Thomas Andrew Turner who converted into an English-only paper in 1822. Under Turner, The Gazette identified with the interests of anglophone business leaders in their fight with the Patriote movement.

On April 25, 1849, The Gazette published a special edition in which its editor-in-chief, James Moir Ferres, called the "Anglo-Saxon" residents to arms after Royal Assent of a compensation law for Lower Canada. This was among the main events leading to the burning of the Parliament Buildings. Ferres was subsequently arrested, though soon released on bail and set free without trial.

In 1939, The Gazette hired its first editorial cartoonist – John Collins, who worked a term of 43 years.

On October 22, 1968, The Gazette and its parent company, The Gazette Printing Company Limited, were acquired by the Southam newspaper chain, which owned major dailies across Canada.

For many years, The Gazette was caught in a three-way fight for the English newspaper audience in Montreal with the tabloid Montreal Herald and the broadsheet Montreal Star. The Gazette was second in circulation to the Montreal Star, which sold more newspapers in the city and had a significant national reputation in the first half of the 20th century. The Montreal Herald closed in 1957, after publishing for 146 years. The Montreal Star, part of the FP Publications chain (which owned the Winnipeg Free Press and, at the time, The Globe and Mail), endured a long strike and ceased publication in 1979, less than a year after the strike was settled.

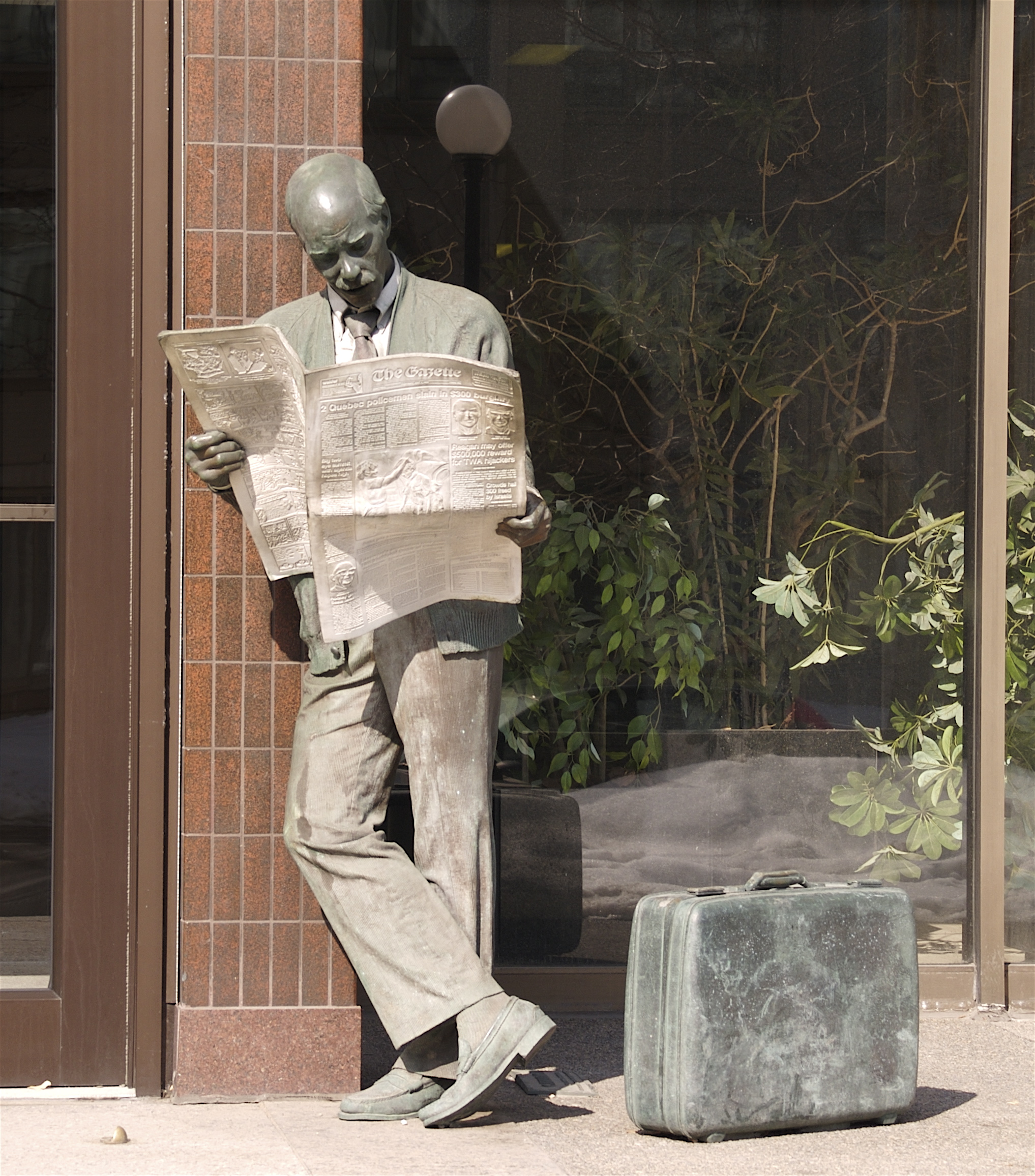
A statue in Westmount of man reading The Gazette

In 1988, a competing English-language daily, the Montreal Daily News, was launched. The Montreal Daily News adopted a tabloid format and introduced a Sunday edition, forcing The Gazette to respond. After the Montreal Daily News closed in 1989, after less than two years in operation, The Gazette kept its Sunday edition going until August 2010.

In 1996, the Southam papers were bought by Conrad Black's Hollinger Inc. Then in August 2000, Hollinger sold the Southam newspapers, including The Gazette, to Canwest Global Communications Corp., controlled by the Winnipeg-based Asper family. In 2010, a new media group, Postmedia, bought The Gazette and other papers from the financially troubled Canwest.

To celebrate its 150th anniversary, The Gazette published a facsimile of one of its earliest issues. Much effort was made to use a type of paper that imitated 18th century paper, with fake chainlines and laidlines to make the paper look old.

== Today ==
Today, The Gazette's audience is primarily Quebec's English-speaking community. The Gazette is one of the three dailies published in Montreal, the other two being French-language newspapers: Le Journal de Montréal and Le Devoir. (La Presse is only published digitally since 2018.)

In recent years, The Gazette has stepped up efforts to reach bilingual francophone professionals and adjusted its coverage accordingly. The current editor-in-chief is Marilena Lucci. The deputy editor is Basem Boshra and the associate managing editor is Jeff Blond.

Logo used from 2014 to 2023

On April 30, 2013, Postmedia Network announced that it would be eliminating the role of publisher at each of its newspapers, including The Gazette. Instead, the company's 10 newspapers were overseen by regional publishers, one each for the Pacific, the Prairies and eastern Canada. Alan Allnutt, who was the publisher of The Gazette at the time, became the regional publisher of Postmedia's Alberta and Saskatchewan papers. Gerry Nott, publisher of the Ottawa Citizen, now also oversees The Gazette, the Windsor Star and Postmedia's flagship title, the National Post. On May 5, 2014, it was announced that printing of The Gazette would be contracted out to Transcontinental Media in August 2014 and that the existing Notre-Dame-de-Grâce facility would be closed, resulting in a loss of 54 full-time and 61 part-time positions at the paper. The August 16, 2014, issue was the final issue printed by the Postmedia-owned facility.

On October 21, 2014, The Gazette was relaunched as part of the Postmedia Reimagined project, adopting a similar look, and a similar suite of digital platforms, to its sister paper, the Ottawa Citizen, which had relaunched earlier in the year. As part of the relaunch, the paper was officially renamed the Montreal Gazette, reflecting its longstanding common name outside its city of publication (as well as its Web domain, montrealgazette.com). The paper had not included Montreal in its masthead in several years.

With its December 1, 2023 issue, The Gazette once again dropped "Montreal" from its masthead and returned to its pre-2014 name and logo.

== Sections ==
=== Weekdays ===
- Section A — Local, national and international news, opinion columns, editorials, editorial cartoon, letters to the editor, business news, sports news, arts and entertainment news
- Section B — Sports (Mondays and Thursdays), Business (Tuesdays), Food (Wednesdays), Movies (Fridays)
- Section C — Driving and classifieds (Mondays)

=== Saturday ===
- Section A — Local, national and international news
- Section B — Saturday Extra: Feature stories and opinion columns, editorials, editorial cartoon, letters to the editor
- Section C — Business news and weather
- Section D — Sports
- Section E — Culture
- Section F — Homefront, classified, working
- Section G — Travel
- Section H — Weekend Life
- Section W — Diversions

== Editors-in-chief ==
- Mark Harrison (1977–1989)
- Norman Webster (1989–1993)
- Joan Fraser (1993–1996)
- Alan Allnutt (1996–2000)
- Peter Stockland (2000–2004)
- Andrew Phillips (2004–2009)
- Raymond Brassard (2010–2013)
- Lucinda Chodan (2013–2022)
- Bert Archer (2022–2023)
- Marilena Lucci (2023–Present)

== Present personalities ==
- Mike Boone
- Bill Brownstein
- Josh Freed
- L. Ian MacDonald
- Terry Mosher (Aislin)
- Joseph A. Schwarcz
- Jack Todd

== Past personalities ==
- Nick Auf der Maur
- Dave Bist
- Ted Blackman
- Richard Burnett
- Lesley Chesterman
- Edgar Andrew Collard
- John Collins
- Christopher Curtis
- Michael Farber
- Red Fisher
- William Johnson
- Dane Lanken
- Ken McKenzie
- Mordecai Richler
- Tommy Schnurmacher
- Eric Siblin
- Paul Wells
- Robert Smeaton White

== See also ==
- List of Quebec media
- List of newspapers in Canada

Montreal newspapers:

- La Presse
- Le Devoir
- Le Journal de Montréal
- Métro
- The Montreal Herald (defunct)
- Montreal Daily News (defunct)
- The Montreal Star (defunct)
