= Constitutional history of Canada =

The constitutional history of Canada begins with the 1763 Treaty of Paris, in which France ceded most of New France to Great Britain. Canada was the colony along the St Lawrence River, part of present-day Ontario and Quebec. Its government underwent many structural changes over the following century. In 1867 Canada became the name of the new federal Dominion extending ultimately from the Atlantic to the Pacific and the Arctic coasts. Canada obtained legislative autonomy from the United Kingdom in 1931, and had its constitution (including a new rights charter) patriated in 1982. Canada's constitution includes the amalgam of constitutional law spanning this history.

== Treaty of Paris (1763) ==
On February 10, 1763, France ceded most of New France to Great Britain. The 1763 Treaty of Paris confirmed the cession of Canada, including all its dependencies, Acadia (Nova Scotia) and Cape Breton Island to Great Britain. A year before, France had secretly signed a treaty ceding Louisiana to Spain to avoid losing it to the British.

At the time of the signing, the French colony of Canada was already under the control of the British army since the capitulation of the government of New France in 1760. (See the Articles of Capitulation of Montreal.)

== Royal proclamation (1763) ==
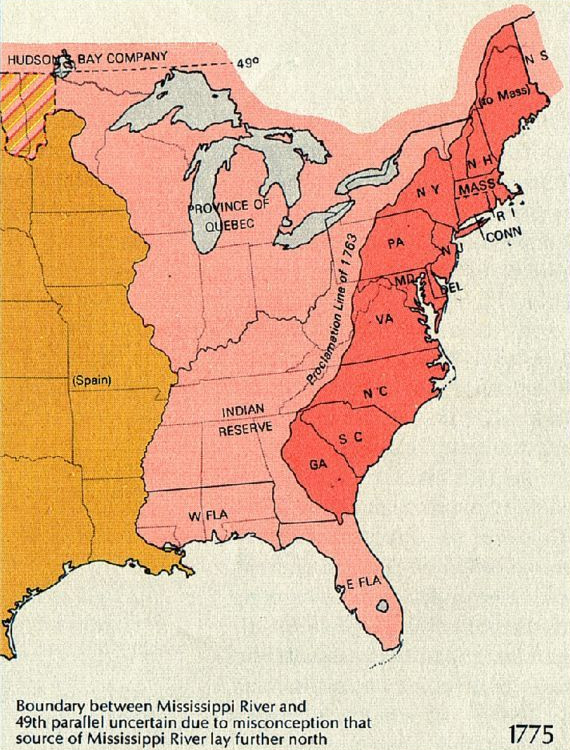
A portion of eastern North America; the 1763 "Proclamation line" is the border between the red and the pink areas.

The policy of Great Britain regarding its newly acquired colonies of America was revealed in a Royal Proclamation, issued on October 7, 1763. The proclamation renamed Canada "The Province of Quebec", redefined its borders and established a British-appointed colonial government. Although not an act of Parliament, the proclamation expressed the will of the British Crown to govern its new possessions. The proclamation was thus considered constitution of Quebec until the passing of the Quebec Act 1774 (14 Geo. 3. c. 83), by which the colony was granted a legislature. The new governor of the colony was given "the power and direction to summon and call a general assembly of the people's representatives" when the "state and circumstances of the said Colonies will admit thereof".

The governor was also given the mandate to "make, constitute, and ordain Laws, Statutes, and Ordinances for the Public Peace, Welfare, and good Government of our said Colonies, and of the People and Inhabitants thereof" with the consent of the British-appointed councils and representatives of the people. In the meantime, all British subjects in the colony were guaranteed of the protection of the law of England, and the governor was given the power to erect courts of judicature and public justice to hear all causes, civil or public.

The royal proclamation contained elements that conflicted with the Articles of Capitulation of Montreal, which granted Canadians the privilege to maintain their civil laws and practise their religion. The application of British laws such as the penal Laws caused numerous administrative problems and legal irregularities. The requirements of the Test Act also effectively excluded Catholics from administrative positions in the British Empire.

When James Murray was commissioned as captain general and governor in chief of the Province of Quebec, a four-year military rule ended, and the civil administration of the colony began. Judging the circumstances to be inappropriate to the establishment of British institutions in the colony, Murray was of the opinion that it would be more practical to keep the current civil institutions. He believed that, over time, the Canadians would recognize the superiority of British civilization and willingly adopt its language, its religion, and its customs. He officially recommended to retain French civil law and to dispense the Canadians from taking the Oath of Supremacy. Nevertheless, Murray followed his instructions and British institutions began to be established. On September 17, 1764, the courts of the King's Bench and Common Pleas were constituted.

Tensions quickly developed between the British merchants or old subjects, newly established in the colony, and Governor Murray. They were very dissatisfied with the state of the country and demanded that British institutions be created immediately. They demanded that common law be enforced to protect their business interests and that a house of assembly be created for English-speaking Protestants alone. Murray did not think very highly of these tradesmen. In a letter to the British Lords of Trade, he referred to them as "licentious fanatics" who would not be satisfied but by "the expulsion of the Canadians".

The conciliatory approach of Murray in dealing with the demands of the Canadians was not well received by the merchants. In May 1764, they petitioned the king for Murray's removal, accusing him of betraying the interests of Great Britain by his defence of the Canadian people's interests. The merchants succeeded in having him recalled to London. He was vindicated, but did not return to the Province of Quebec. In 1768, he was replaced by Sir Guy Carleton, who would contribute to the drafting of the Quebec Act 1774.

Murray called in the representatives of the people in 1765; however, his attempt to constitute a representative assembly failed, as, according to historian Francois-Xavier Garneau, the Canadians were unwilling to renounce their Catholic faith and take the test oath required to hold office.

=== Restoration movement (1764–1774) ===
On October 29, 1764, 94 Canadian subjects submitted a petition demanding that the orders of the king be available in French and that they be allowed to participate in the government.

In December 1773, Canadian landlords submitted a petition and a memorandum in which they asked:

- That the ancient laws, privileges, and customs be restored in full
- That the province be extended to its former boundaries
- That the law of Britain be applied to all subjects without distinction

They expressed their opinion that the time was not right for a house of assembly because the colony could not afford it and suggested that a larger council, composed of both new and old subjects, would be a better choice.

In May 1774 the British merchants trading in Quebec responded by submitting their case to the king.

=== Reform movement (1765–1791) ===
As early as 1765, British merchants established in Quebec City addressed a petition to the king to ask for "the establishment of a house of representatives in this province as in all the other provinces" of the continent. Indeed, all the other colonies of British America had parliamentary institutions, even Nova Scotia, which obtained its parliament in 1758.

The movement for reform did not receive any support from the Canadians originally.

== Quebec Act (1774) ==
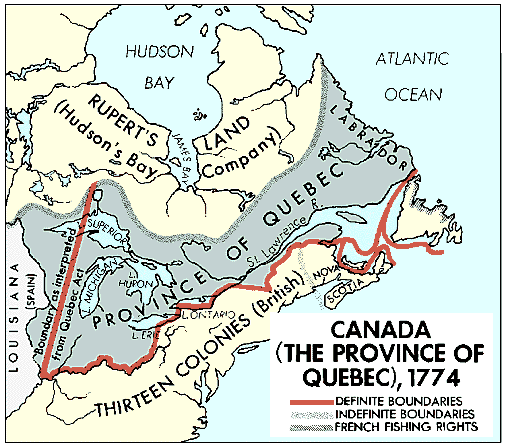
The Province of Quebec in 1774

The Quebec Act granted many of the requests of the Canadians. Enacted on June 13, 1774, the act changed the following:

- The boundaries of the Province of Quebec were greatly expanded to the west and south. The territory now covered the whole of the Great Lakes Basin.
- The free practice of the Catholic faith was confirmed. The Roman Catholic Church was officially recognized and permitted to operate under British sovereignty.
- The Canadians were dispensed of the test oath, which was replaced by an oath to George III that had no reference to Protestantism. This made it possible for Canadians to hold positions in the colonial administration.
- French civil law was fully restored and British criminal law was established. The seigneurial method of land tenancy was thus maintained.
- A British criminal code was established.

No assembly of representatives was created, which allowed the governor to keep ruling under the advice of his counsellors.

The British merchants of Quebec were not pleased by this new act, which ignored their most important demands. They continued to campaign to abolish the current civil code and establish a house of assembly excluding Catholics and French-speakers.

The Quebec Act was also very negatively received in the British colonies to the south. (See the Intolerable Acts.) This act was in force in the Province of Quebec when the American Revolutionary War broke out in April 1775.

=== Letters to the inhabitants of the Province of Quebec (1774-1775) ===
During the American revolution, the Continental Congress attempted to rally the Canadian people to its cause. The delegates wrote three letters (Letters to the inhabitants of Canada) inviting them to join in the revolution. The letters circulated in Canada, mostly in the cities of Montreal and Quebec. The first letter was written on October 26, 1774, and signed by the president of the congress, Henry Middleton. It was translated into French by Fleury Mesplet, who printed it in Philadelphia and distributed the copies himself in Montreal.

The letter pleaded the cause of democratic government, the separation of powers, taxation power, habeas corpus, trial by jury, and freedom of the press.

The second letter was written on May 25, 1775. Shorter, it urged the inhabitants of Canada not to side against the revolutionary forces. (The congress was aware that the British colonial government had already asked the Canadians to resist the call of the revolutionaries.)

On May 22, 1775, Bishop of Quebec Jean-Olivier Briand sent out a mandement asking the Canadians to close their ears to the call of the "rebels" and defend their country and their king against the invasion.

Although both the British and the revolutionaries succeeded at recruiting Canadian men for militia, the majority of the people chose not to get involved in the conflict.

In 1778, Frederick Haldimand became governor in replacement of Guy Carleton. (He served up until 1786, when Guy Carleton (now Lord Dorchester) returned as governor.)

=== Resumption of the reform movement (1784) ===
Soon after the war, which ended with the signing of the Treaty of Paris in 1783, the constitutional question resurfaced.

In July 1784, Pierre du Calvet, a rich French merchant established in Montreal, published a pamphlet entitled Appel à la justice de l'État (Call to the Justice of the State) in London. Printed in French, the document is the first plea in favour of a constitutional reform in Canada. Du Calvet, imprisoned at the same time and for the same reasons as Fleury Mesplet and Valentine Jautard, both suspected of sympathizing and collaborating with the American revolutionaries during the war, undertook to have the injustice committed towards him be publicly known by publishing The Case of Peter du Calvet and, a few months later, his Appel à la justice de l'État.

On November 24, 1784, two petition for a house of assembly, one signed by 1436 "New Subjects" (Canadians) and another signed by 855 "Old Subjects" (British), were sent to the king of Great Britain. The first petition contained 14 demands. "A Plan for a House of Assembly" was also sketched in the same month of November. In December, "An Address to His Majesty in opposition to the House of Assembly and a list of Objections" were printed by the press of Fleury Mesplet in Montreal. The main objection to the house of assembly was that the colony was not, according to its signatories, in a position to be taxed.

At the time the November 24 petition was submitted to the king, numerous United Empire Loyalists were already seeking refuge in Quebec and Nova Scotia. In Quebec, the newly arrived settlers contributed to increase the number of people voicing for a rapid constitutional reform. In Nova Scotia, the immigrants demanded a separate colony.

=== Parliamentary constitution project (1789) ===
In 1786, the British government appointed Guy Carleton, as "governor-in-chief" and also governor of Quebec, New Brunswick, Nova Scotia, and St. John's Island (present-day Prince Edward Island). Carleton, now Lord Dorchester, had been British commander in Canada and governor of Quebec during the American Revolutionary War. When he returned as governor, he was already informed that the arrival of the Loyalists would require changes.

On October 20, 1789, Home Secretary William Wyndham Grenville wrote a private and secret letter to Carleton, informing him of the plans of the king's counsellors to modify Canada's constitution. The letter leaves little doubt as to the influence that American independence and the taking of the Bastille (which had just occurred in July) had on the decision. In the first paragraph, Grenville writes: "I am persuaded that it is a point of true Policy to make these Concessions at a time when they may be received as matter of favour, and when it is in Our own power to regulate and direct the manner of applying them, rather than to wait 'till they shall be extorted from Us by a necessity which shall neither leave Us any discretion in the form, nor any merit in the substance of what we give."

Grenville prepared the constitution in August 1789. But he was appointed to the House of Lords before he could submit his project to the House of Commons. Thus, Prime Minister William Pitt did it in his place.

British merchants established in Quebec sent Adam Lymburner to Britain to present their objections. They objected to the creation of two provinces, suggested an increase in the number of representatives, asked for elections every three years (instead of seven), and requested an electoral division which would have overrepresented the Old Subjects by granting more representatives to the populations of the cities.

Lymburner's revisions were opposed by Whigs such as Charles James Fox, and in the end only the suggestions related to the frequency of elections and the number of representatives were retained.

== Constitutional Act (1791) ==
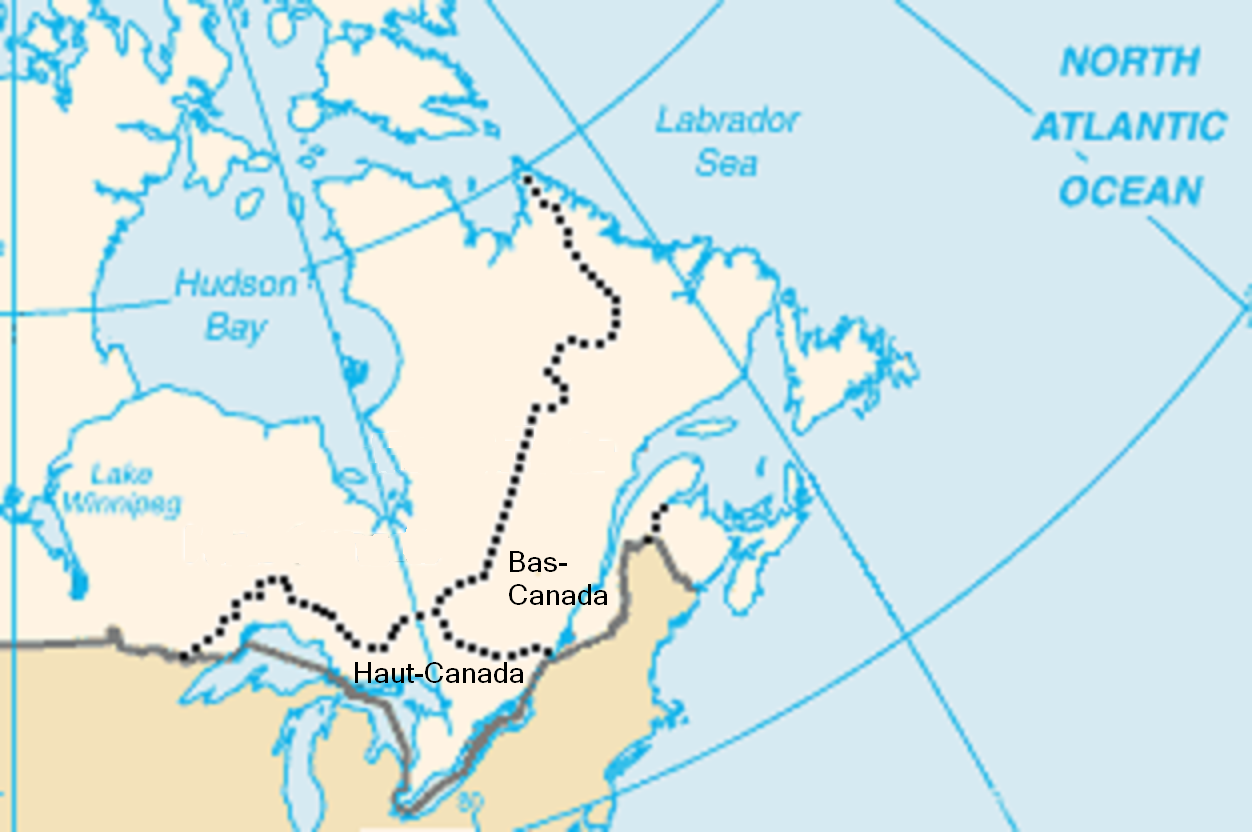
Canada in 1791 after the act.

On June 10, 1791, the Constitutional Act 1791 (31 Geo. 3. c. 31) was enacted in London and gave Canada its first parliamentary constitution. Containing 50 articles, the act brought the following changes:

- The Province of Quebec was divided into two distinct provinces, Province of Lower Canada (present-day Quebec) and Province of Upper Canada (present-day Ontario).
- Each province was given an elected Legislative Assembly, an appointed Legislative Council, and an appointed Executive Council.
- Upper Canada was to be administered by a lieutenant governor appointed by the governor general, while Lower Canada was to be administered by a direct representative of the governor general.
- The Legislative Councils were to be established with no fewer than seven members in Upper Canada and fifteen members in Lower Canada. The members were to hold their seat for life.
- The Legislative Assembly was to be established with no fewer than sixteen members in Upper Canada and fifty members in Lower Canada.
- The governor was given the power to appoint the speaker of the Legislative Council, to fix the time and place of the elections and to give or withhold assent to bills.
- Provisions were made to allot clergy reserves to the Protestant churches in each province.

This partition ensured that Loyalists would constitute a majority in Upper Canada and allow for the application of exclusively British laws in this province. As soon as the province was divided, a series of acts were passed to abolish the French civil code in Upper Canada. In Lower Canada, the coexistence of French civil law and English criminal law continued.

Although it solved the immediate problems related to the settlement of the Loyalists in Canada, the new constitution brought a whole new set of political problems which were rooted in the constitution. Some of these problems were common to both provinces, while others were unique to Lower Canada or Upper Canada. The problems that eventually affected both provinces were:

- The Legislative Assemblies did not have full control over the revenues of the provinces
- The Executive and Legislative Councils were not responsible to the Legislative Assembly

In the two provinces, a movement for constitutional reform took shape within the majority party, the Parti canadien of Lower Canada and the Reformers of Upper Canada. Leader of the Parti Canadien, Pierre-Stanislas Bédard was the first politician of Lower Canada to formulate a project of reform to put an end to the opposition between the elected Legislative Assembly and the Governor and his Council which answered only the Colonial Office in London. Putting forward the idea of ministerial responsibility, he proposed that the members of the Legislative Council be appointed by the Governor on the recommendation of the elected House.

=== Union Bill (1822) ===
In 1822, the Secretary of Colonial Office Lord Bathurst and his under-secretary Robert John Wilmot-Horton secretly submitted a bill to British House of Commons which projected the legislative union of the two Canadian provinces. Two months after the adjournment of the discussions on the bill, the news arrived in Lower Canada and caused a sharp reaction.

Supported by Governor Dalhousie, anglophone petitioners from the Eastern Townships, Quebec City and Kingston, the bill submitted in London provided, among other things, that each of the two sections of the new united province would have a maximum of 60 representatives, which would have put the French-speaking majority of Lower Canada in a position of minority in the new Parliament.

The mobilization of the citizens of Lower Canada and Upper Canada began in late summer and petitions in opposition to the project were prepared. The subject was discussed as soon as the session at the Parliament of Lower Canada opened on January 11, 1823. Ten days later, on January 21, the Legislative Assembly adopted a resolution authorizing a Lower Canadian delegation to go to London in order to officially present the quasi-unanimous opposition of the representatives of Lower Canada to the project of union. Exceptionally, even the Legislative Council gave its support to this resolution, with a majority of one vote. Having in their possession a petition of some 60 000 signatures, the Speaker of the House of Assembly, Louis-Joseph Papineau, as well as John Neilson, Member of Parliament, went to London to present the opinion of the majority of the population which they represented.

Faced with the massive opposition of people most concerned with the bill, the British government finally gave up the union project submitted for adoption by its own Colonial Office.

=== Report of the Special Committee of the House of Commons (1828) ===
A Select Committee of the House of Commons on the Civil Government of Canada was appointed on May 2, 1828 "to enquire into the state of the civil government of Canada, as established by the Act 31 Geo. III., chap. 31, and to report their observations and opinions thereupon to the house."

It reported on July 22 of the same year. It recommended against the union of Upper Canada and Lower Canada and in favour of constitutional and administrative reforms intended to prevent the recurrence of the abuses complained of in Lower Canada.

=== The Ninety-Two Resolutions of the Legislative Assembly of Lower Canada (1834) ===
These constituted a sort of declaration of rights on the part of the patriote party. They were drafted by A. N. Morin, but were inspired by Louis-Joseph Papineau. They demanded the application of the elective principle to the political institutions of the province, after the American model; but did not advocate, in any explicit way, the introduction of responsible government. Lord Aylmer, the governor-general of Canada at that time, in an analysis of the resolutions, maintained that "eleven of them represented the truth; six contained truth mixed with falsehood; sixteen were wholly false; seventeen were doubtful; twelve were ridiculous; seven repetitions; fourteen consisted of abuse; four were both false and seditious; and the remaining five were indifferent."

=== Royal Commission for the Investigation of all Grievances Affecting His Majesty's Subjects of Lower Canada (1835) ===
Following the adoption of the Ninety-Two Resolutions, the Governor Gosford arrived in Lower Canada to replace governor Aylmer. Gosford set up royal commission of inquiry conducted by Charles E. Gray and George Gipps. The Royal Commission for the Investigation of all Grievances Affecting His Majesty's Subjects of Lower Canada reported on November 17, 1836, and the Ten resolutions of John Russel were mostly based on it.

=== John Russell's Ten Resolutions (1837) ===
On March 2, 1837, John Russell, the British Colonial Secretary, submitted ten resolutions to Parliament in response to the ninety-two resolutions. Parliament adopted the resolutions on March 6.

Most of the recommendations brought forth by the elected assemblies were systematically ignored by the Executive Councils. This was particularly true in Lower Canada with an assembly consisting mostly of French-Canadian members of the Parti Patriote. This impasse created considerable tensions between the French-Canadian political class and the British government. In 1834 Louis-Joseph Papineau, a French-Canadian political leader, submitted a document entitled the Ninety-Two Resolutions to the Crown. The document requested vast democratic reforms such as the transfer of power to elected representatives. The reply came three years later in the form of the Russell Resolutions, which not only rejected the 92 Resolutions but also revoked one of the assembly's few real powers, the power to pass its own budget. This rebuff heightened tensions and escalated into armed rebellions in 1837 and 1838, known as the Lower Canada Rebellion. The uprisings were short-lived, however, as British troops quickly defeated the rebels and burned their villages in reprisal.

The rebellion was also contained by the Catholic clergy, which, by representing the only French-Canadian institution with independent authority, exercised a tremendous influence over its constituents. During and after the rebellions Catholic priests and the bishop of Montreal told their congregants that questioning established authority was a sin that would prevent them from receiving the sacraments. The Church refused to give Christian burials to supporters of the rebellion. With liberal and progressive forces suppressed in Lower Canada, the Catholic Church's influence dominated the French-speaking side of French Canadian/British relations from the 1840s until the Quiet Revolution secularized Quebec society in the 1960s.

=== Suspension of the Constitutional Act (1838) ===
Approximately four months after having proclaimed martial law in the district of Montreal, Governor Gosford suspended, on March 27, 1838, the Constitutional Act 1791 (31 Geo. 3. c. 31) and set up a Special Council.

=== Report on the Affairs of British North America (1839) ===
Following the rebellions, in May 1838, the British government sent Governor General Lord Durham to Lower and Upper Canada in order to investigate the uprisings and to bring forth solutions. His recommendations were formulated in what is known as "Lord Durham's Report" and suggested the forced union of the Canadas with the expressed purpose of "making [Lower Canada] an English Province [that] should never again be placed in any hands but those of an English population." Doing so, he claimed, would speed up the assimilation of the French-Canadian population, "a people with no history, and no literature" into a homogenized English population. This would prevent what he considered to be ethnic conflicts.

== Act of Union (1840) ==
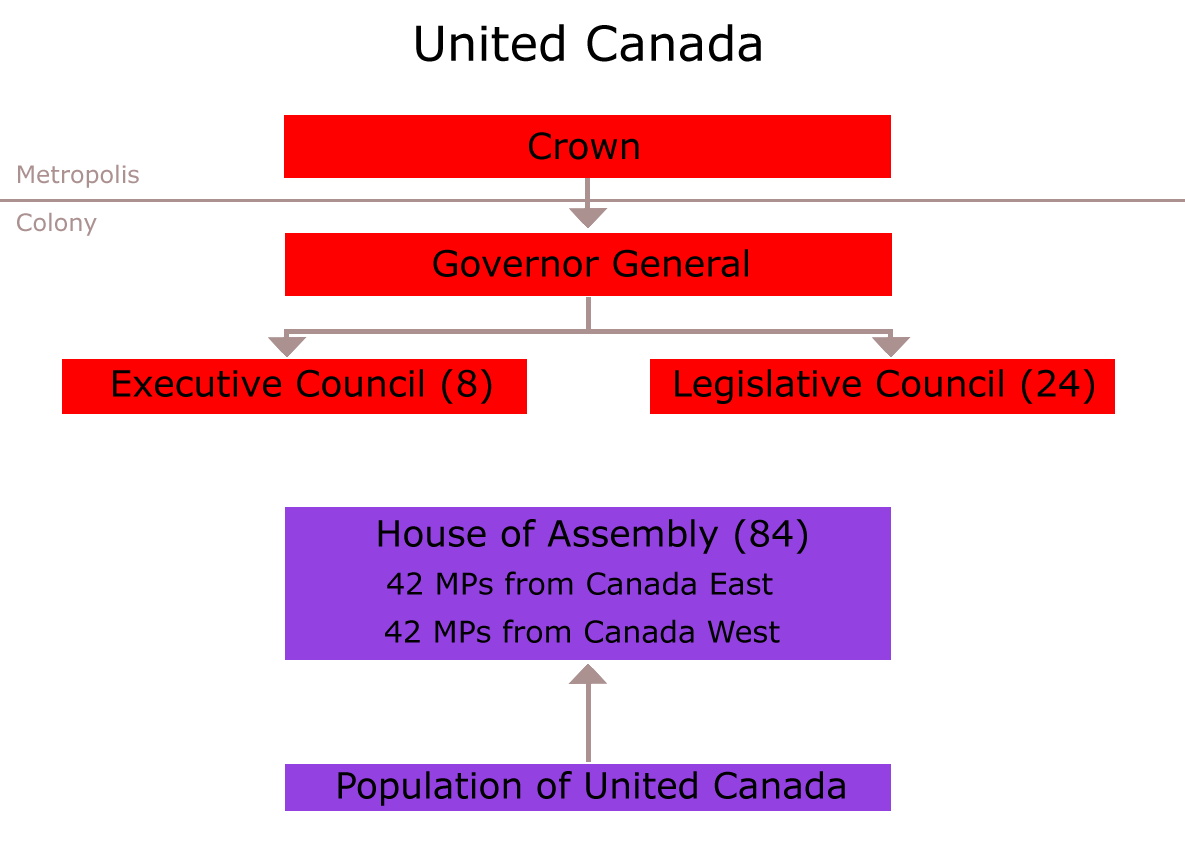
Political organization under the Union Act (1840)

Following the publication of the Report on the Affairs of British North America, the British Parliament adopted, in June 1840, the Act of Union. The new act, which effected the legislative union of Upper Canada and Lower Canada to form a single province named the Province of Canada, implemented the principal recommendation of John George Lambton's report, but did not grant a "responsible government" to the new political entity. Entering into force as of February 1841, the 62 articles of the Act of Union brought about the following changes:

- The provinces of Upper Canada and Lower Canada were unified to form the Province of Canada;
- The parliamentary institutions of the former provinces were abolished and replaced by a single Parliament of Canada;
- Each of the two sections of the province corresponding to the old provinces were allotted an equal number of elected representatives;
- The old electoral districts were redrawn in order to overrepresent the population of former Upper Canada and underrepresent the population of former Lower Canada;
- The candidates to the legislative elections had to prove from then on that they were the owners of a land worth at least 500 pounds sterling;
- The mandates, proclamations, laws, procedures and journals had from then on to be published and archived in the English language only;

As a result, Lower Canada and Upper Canada, with its enormous debt, were united in 1840, and French was banned in the legislature for about eight years. Eight years later, an elected and responsible government was granted. By this time, the French-speaking majority of Lower Canada had become a political minority in a unified Canada. This, as Lord Durham had recommended in his report, resulted in English political control over the French-speaking part of Canada, and ensured the colony's loyalty to the British crown. On the other hand, continual legislative deadlock between English and French led to a movement to replace unitary government with a federal one. This movement culminated in Canadian Confederation.

=== Ministerial responsibility (1848) ===
Ministerial responsibility, the principal object of parliamentary struggles conducted by the Parti Canadien in Lower Canada and the Reformers in Upper Canada, becomes a reality in 1848, when Governor Lord Elgin agreed to let the leaders of the majority parties in Canada-East and the Canada-West, Louis-Hippolyte Lafontaine and Robert Baldwin, form their own Executive Council. The Province of Canada therefore had its first government made up of members taken in the elected House of Assembly. This important change occurred a few months after Governor of Nova Scotia, Sir John Harvey, let James Boyle Uniacke form his own government. Nova Scotia thus became the first colony of the British Empire to have a government comparable to that of Great Britain itself.

=== Confederation projects (1858–1864) ===
In 1858, Joseph-Charles Taché, doctor and journalist from Quebec City, published a detailed project of federation. It was the first time that a project of this type was presented publicly since the proposal that John A. Roebuck had made in the same direction to John George Lambton while he was a governor of the Canadas in 1838.

The same year, Alexander T. Galt, Member of Parliament for Sherbrooke, agreed to become a Minister of Finance in the Macdonald-Cartier government provided that his own project of confederation is accepted.

== British North America Act (1867) ==
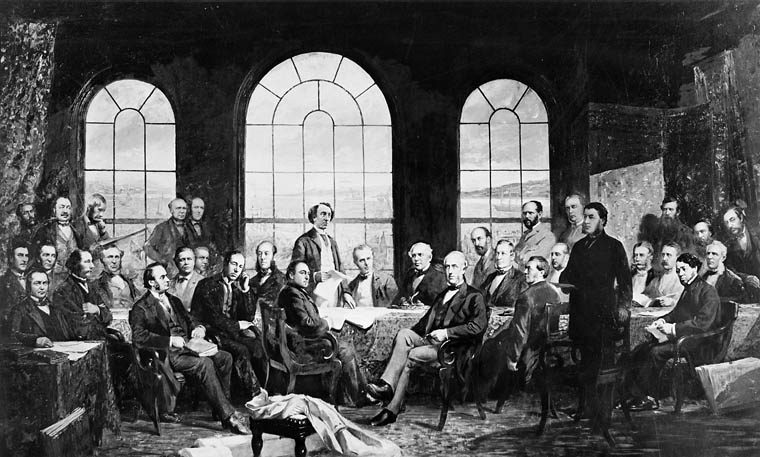
Robert Harris's Fathers of Confederation, an amalgamation of the Charlottetown and Quebec conferences.

The British North America Act 1867 was the act that established Canada, by the confederation of the North American British colonies of the Canada, New Brunswick and Nova Scotia. The former subdivisions of Canada were renamed from Canada West and Canada East to the Province of Ontario and Province of Quebec, respectively. Quebec and Ontario were given equal footing with New Brunswick and Nova Scotia in the Parliament of Canada. This was done to counter the claims of manifest destiny made by the United States, for the defence of Britain's holdings. American claims are evinced by the invasions of the Canadas during the American Revolutionary War and the War of 1812.

Prior to the British North America Act 1867, the British colonies of New Brunswick, Nova Scotia and Prince Edward Island, discussed the possibility of a fusion to counter the threat of American annexation, and to reduce the costs of governance. The Province of Canada entered these negotiations at the behest of the British government, and this led to the ambivalence of Prince Edward Island, which delayed joining the new Dominion until 1873. The constitutional conference, ironically, was held on Prince Edward Island, in Charlottetown. Newfoundland also participated (at the Quebec Conference) and likewise declined to join.

=== Province of Manitoba (1870) ===
On May 12, 1870, the British Crown proclaimed the Manitoba Act, enacted by the Parliament of Canada, effectively giving birth to the province of Manitoba. The 36 articles of the act established the territorial limits, the subjects' right to vote, the representation in the Canadian House of Commons, the number of senators, the provincial legislature, permitted the use of English and French in the Parliament and in front of the courts and authorized the setting-up of a denominational education system.

The coexistence, on the territory of the province, of French-speaking and Catholic communities (the Métis) as well as English-speaking and Protestant communities (British and Anglo-Canadian immigrants) explains the institutional arrangement copied from that of Quebec.

=== Statute of Westminster (1931) ===
Canada and the other British dominions achieved full legislative sovereignty with the passage of the Statute of Westminster 1931, but prior to the Canada Act 1982 the British North America Acts were excluded from the operation of the Statute of Westminster and could only be amended by the British Parliament.

=== The Quiet Revolution (1960s) ===
In the early 1960s, the Quiet Revolution, stemming from a new assertiveness and a heightened sense of national identity among Québécois, dramatically changed the face of Quebec's institutions. The new provincial government headed by Jean Lesage and operating under the slogans "Il faut que ça change!" and "Maître chez nous" ("It must change!", "Masters in our own house") secularized government institutions, nationalized electricity production and encouraged unionization. The reforms sought to redefine the relations between the vastly working-class francophone Québécois and the mostly anglophone business class. Thus passive Catholic nationalism stylized by Father Lionel Groulx gave way to a more active pursuit of independence, and in 1963 the first bombings by the Front de libération du Québec occurred. The FLQ's violent pursuit of a socialist and independent Quebec culminated in the 1970 kidnappings of British diplomat, James Cross and then the provincial minister of labour, Pierre Laporte in what is known as the October Crisis.

The Quiet Revolution also forced the evolution of several political parties, and so, in 1966, a reformed Union Nationale led by Daniel Johnson, Sr., returned to power under the slogan "Equality or Independence". The new premier of Quebec stated, "As a basis for its nationhood, Quebec wants to be master of its own decision-making in what concerns the human growth of its citizens—that is to say education, social security and health in all their aspects—their economic affirmation—the power to set up economic and financial institutions they feel are required—their cultural development—not only the arts and letters, but also the French language—and the Quebec community's external development—its relations with certain countries and international bodies".

=== Fulton Formula (1961) ===
The Fulton Formula was named for federal Minister of Justice E. Davie Fulton. It proposed an amending formula that included unanimous consent of Parliament and all provinces for select areas of jurisdiction, the consent of Parliament and of the provinces concerned for provisions affecting one or more, but not all of the provinces, the consent of Parliament and of all the provinces except Newfoundland in matters of education, and the consent of Parliament and of the legislature of Newfoundland in matters of education in that province. For all other amendments, consent of Parliament and of at least two-thirds of the provincial legislatures representing at least 50 per cent of the population of Canada would be required. Agreement amongst the provinces was not achieved and the proposal was not implemented, but it was revived again with the Fulton-Favreau Formula in 1964, and several components were included in the Constitution Act, 1982.

=== Royal Commission on Bilingualism and Biculturalism (1963) ===
For the federal government, this demand for an enormous shift in power to a province under a threat of a possible unilateral declaration of independence was cause for great alarm. In 1967, on the initiative of Premier John Robarts of Ontario, a provincial first ministers' conference was held in Toronto to discuss the Canadian confederation of the future. From this, a first round of what would become annual constitutional meetings of all provincial premiers and the prime minister of Canada, was held in February 1968. On the initiative of Prime Minister Lester Pearson the conference undertook to address the desires of Quebec. Amongst numerous initiatives, the conference members examined the recommendations of a Bilingualism and Biculturalism Commission, the question of a Charter of Rights, regional disparities, and the timelines of a general review of the constitution (the British North America Act).

In 1968, René Lévesque's Mouvement souveraineté-association joined forces with the Rassemblement pour l'indépendance nationale and the Ralliement national to create the Parti Québécois; Quebec's provincial political party that has since espoused the province's sovereignty. That same year, Pierre Trudeau became prime minister of Canada by winning the leadership race of the federal Liberal Party. He would undertake numerous legislative measures to enhance the status of Quebec within Canada, including the passage into law in 1969 of the Official Languages Act, which expanded upon the original official language status of both French and English from the 1867 British North America Act.

=== Fulton-Favreau Formula (1964) ===
The Fulton–Favreau formula was a proposed formula of amendment of the Constitution of Canada developed by federal justice minister E. Davie Fulton and Quebec Liberal Guy Favreau in the 1960s and approved at a federal-provincial conference in 1965. The formula would have achieved the patriation of the Constitution. Under the formula, all provinces would have to approve amendments that would be relevant to provincial jurisdiction, including the use of the French and English languages, but only the relevant provinces would be needed to approve amendments concerned with a particular region of Canada. The provinces would have been given the right to enact laws amending their respective constitutions, except for provisions concerning the office of Lieutenant Governor. Two-thirds of the provinces representing half of the population, as well as the federal Parliament, would be needed for amendments regarding education. The formula officially died in 1965 when Quebec Premier Jean Lesage withdrew his support. Modified versions re-emerged in the Victoria Charter (1971) and in the Constitution Act, 1982.

=== Victoria Charter (1971) ===
The 1971 Victoria Conference, a meeting between the federal government and the provinces, brought about the Victoria Charter. This Charter sought to establish a formula for amending the Constitution without requiring the unanimous consent of the provinces. Notably, it would give a veto to any province having or having ever had 25 percent of the Canadian population, thus essentially giving Quebec and Ontario veto powers. The provinces were supposed to confirm their acceptance by June 28, 1971, but a change of premiers in Saskatchewan and the reluctance of the federal government to recommend the Charter to Quebec's legislature, due to deficiencies in the clauses dealing with income security, led to the failure of this initiative.

=== Bill C-60, the Constitutional Amendment Bill ===
Bill C-60 was tabled in the House of Commons by the Prime Minister It contained a guarantee of "the right of the individual to the use and enjoyment of property, and the right not to be deprived thereof except in accordance with law." This language was contentious, especially in PEI. and as a result, Bill C-60 was referred to the Supreme Court of Canada, prior to passage. The reference contained questions on the Senate. The SCC ruled, in Re British North America Act and the Federal Senate (1979), 30 NR 271, that the federal government could act in matters related to section 91.1 of the British North America Act only with regards to matters of exclusive federal jurisdiction. The government chose to discontinue Bill C-60 as a result of this decision.

=== Referendum on Sovereignty-Association (1980) ===
In 1976 the Parti Québécois won the provincial election in Quebec with a 41.4 per cent to 33.8 per cent margin over the Parti libéral du Québec, and in the 1980 Quebec referendum the Parti Québécois sought a mandate from the people of Quebec to negotiate new terms of association with the rest of Canada. With an 84-per-cent voter turnout, 60 per cent of Quebec voters rejected the proposal.

After the 1980 referendum was defeated, the government of Quebec passed Resolution 176, which stated, "A lasting solution to the constitutional issue presupposes recognition of the Quebec-Canada duality."

Meeting in Ottawa on June 9, 1980, the newly re-appointed Prime Minister Pierre Elliott Trudeau and the provincial premiers set an agenda and gave their ministers responsibility for constitutional issues and a mandate to proceed with exploratory discussions to create a new Canadian constitution. However, given the separatist government of Quebec's position that there be two nations established first in accordance with Resolution 176, approval by Quebec of any changes to the BNA Act was impossible. This assertion of national duality was immediately followed with Resolution 177 that stated, "Quebec will never agree, under the existing system, to the patriation of the Constitution and to an amending formula as long as the whole issue of the distribution of powers has not been settled and Quebec has not been guaranteed all the powers it needs for its development." As such, Quebec's government refused to approve the new Canadian constitution a year later. This failure to approve was a highly symbolic act, but one without direct legal consequence as no one questions the authority of the Canadian Constitution within Quebec.

After losing the vote to secede from Canada, the government of Quebec made specific demands as minimum requirements for the Province of Quebec. These demands included control by the government of Quebec over:

- the highest court in the province, replacing the Supreme Court of Canada with the Quebec Court of Appeals;
- language and education;
- economic development;
- communications including cable television, radio, and satellite;
- natural resources, including oil and gas;
- all forms of taxation, except customs duties;
- tourism;
- fisheries, including a partitioning of the Gulf of St. Lawrence from the Atlantic Provinces;
- scientific research;
- recreation;
- prisons;
- labour relations;
- the federal government of Canada paying for the above changes using federal tax funds

The province of Quebec already had theoretically full control over education, health, mineral resources, supplemental taxation, social services, seniors' retirement pension funds, inter-provincial trade, and other areas affecting the daily lives of its citizens. Many Canadians viewed the additional demands as too greatly reducing the power of the federal government, assigning it the role of tax collector and manager of the national border with the United States. Others viewed these changes as desirable, concentrating power in the hands of Québécois politicians, who were more in tune with Québécois desires and interests.

Though the Parti Québécois government said that the federal government of Canada would be responsible for international relations, Quebec proceeded to open its own representative offices in foreign countries around the world. These quasi-embassies were officially named "Quebec Houses". Today, the international affairs minister is responsible for the less-expensive Quebec delegation system.

== Patriation: Canada Act (1982) ==
Subsequently, an agreement between the federal government and all provincial governments, except that of Quebec, agreed to Canada's assumption of full responsibility for its own constitution in 1982 (formerly the responsibility of the Parliament of the United Kingdom). The agreement was enacted as the Canada Act by the British Parliament, and was proclaimed into law by Queen Elizabeth II on April 17, 1982. In Canada, this was called the patriation of the Constitution.

This action (including the creation of a new Canadian Charter of Rights and Freedoms) came from an initiative by Prime Minister Pierre Elliott Trudeau to create a multicultural and bilingual society in all of Canada. Some Canadians saw Trudeau's actions as an attempt to "shove French down their throats" (a common phrase at the time). Many Québécois viewed his compromise as a sell-out and useless: Quebec already had a charter enacted in 1975 and was not interested in imposing French on other provinces; rather, it wished to safeguard it inside Quebec. Many Canadians recognize that the province of Quebec is distinct and unique but they do not conclude from this that Quebec merits a position of greater autonomy than the other provinces, which they feel would be the result of granting special powers that are unavailable to the other provinces.

The government of Quebec, in line with its policy of the duality of nations, objected to the new Canadian constitutional arrangement of 1982 (the patriation), because its formula for future constitutional amendments failed to give Quebec veto power over all constitutional changes.

Some believe that the leaders of Quebec used their refusal to agree to the 1982 constitutional amendment as a bargaining tool to gain leverage in future negotiations, because the federal Canadian government desired (though it is not legally necessary) to include all the provinces willingly into the amended constitution. The National Assembly of Quebec rejected the repatriation unanimously. In spite of Quebec's lack of assent, the constitution still applies within Quebec and to all Quebec residents. Many in Quebec felt that the other provinces' adoption of the amendment without Quebec's assent was a betrayal of the central tenets of federalism. They referred to the decision as the "Night of the Long Knives". On the other hand, many federalists believe that Lévesque's goal at the constitutional conference was to sabotage it and prevent any agreement from being reached, so that he could hold it up as another failure of federalism. In this school of thought, patriation without Quebec's consent was the only option.

== Constitutional reform and upheaval (1982 onwards) ==
Since Canada's constitution was patriated without Quebec's consent, later initiatives would seek to ameliorate the constitutional status quo, with varying results. Two formal, and unsuccessful, attempts were made to reform the constitution. A subsequent sovereignty referendum in 1995 – only narrowly lost – shook Canada to its core, and would bring about the Clarity Act .

=== Meech Lake Accord (1989) ===
In 1987, Prime Minister Brian Mulroney attempted to address these concerns and bring the province into an amended constitution. Quebec's provincial government, then controlled by a party that advocated remaining in Canada on certain conditions (the Parti libéral du Québec), endorsed the accord (called the Meech Lake Accord). Premier Robert Bourassa of Quebec referred to it as the "first step" towards gaining new powers from the federal government. The accord failed, however, as the legislature in Manitoba deadlocked after Elijah Harper refused consent to speed up the process enough to pass the Accord, and Clyde Wells refused to grant a vote on the Accord in the Newfoundland House of Assembly.

In 1990, after the Meech Lake Accord had failed, several Quebec representatives of the ruling Progressive Conservative Party and some members of the Liberal Party of Canada formed the Bloc Québécois, a federal political party intent on defending Quebecers' interests while pursuing independence.

=== Referendum on Charlottetown Accord (1992) ===
The federal government, the twelve provincial and territorial governments, and four first peoples' groups then negotiated a second proposed constitutional accord in 1992—the Charlottetown Accord. Despite near-unanimous support from the country's political leaders, this second effort at constitutional reform was rejected in a nationwide October 1992 referendum. Only 32 per cent of British Columbians supported the accord, because it was seen there and in other western provinces as blocking their hopes for future constitutional changes, such as Senate reform. In Quebec 57 per cent opposed the accord, seeing it as a step backwards compared to the Meech Lake Accord.

In the 1993 federal elections the Bloc Québécois became the official opposition. The following year, the provincial Parti Québécois, also separatist, was elected in Quebec. The two parties' popularity led to a second referendum on independence, the 1995 Quebec referendum.

=== Referendum on sovereignty (1995) ===
A referendum held in Quebec on October 30, 1995, resulted in a narrow 50.56%-to-49.44% decision against Quebec sovereignty, with a 93% voter turnout.

=== Clarity Act (1998) ===
Canadian Prime Minister Jean Chrétien referred the matter over whether a province could unilaterally secede from the federation to the Supreme Court of Canada in December 1999. In its Quebec Secession Reference decision, the Court ruled that the Canadian constitution did not give provinces the power to unilaterally secede. However, it also ruled that, in the event that a clear majority of the population voted in favour of a clear referendum question on secession, the democratic principles of the constitution required political leaders to respond to that result in good faith.

Following the Supreme Court's decision, the federal government introduced legislation known as the Clarity Act which set forth the guidelines for the federal government to recognize any future provincial referendum on secession. The act set out that, after such a referendum was held, the Parliament of Canada would determine whether the question was clear and whether a "clear majority" was attained. The legislation was supported by all members of the House of Commons, except for members of the Bloc Québécois. In response, the Quebec government passed Bill 99, asserting that the Quebec government had the right to submit referendum questions to voters, to determine the referendum question's wording, and to accept 50 percent plus one vote as the required winning majority.

== See also ==
- History of Canada
- Politics of Canada
- Politics of Quebec
- Constitution of Canada
- Expulsion of the Loyalists
- List of documents from the constitutional history of Canada
- Constitutional debate in Canada
- Living tree doctrine
