= Francis Maseres =

English lawyer, scholar and judge

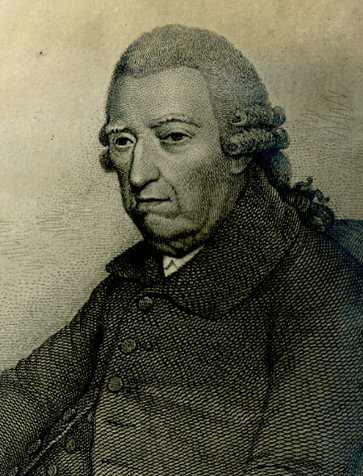
- Francis Maseres
- Born: 15 December 1731; London, England
- Died: 19 May 1824 (aged 92); Reigate, England
- Occupations: lawyer, attorney general, judge, mathematician, historian

Francis Maseres (15 December 1731 – 19 May 1824) was an English lawyer. He is known as attorney general of the Province of Quebec, judge, mathematician, historian, member of the Royal Society, and cursitor baron of the exchequer.

== Biography ==
Francis Maseres was born in London on 15 December 1731. His parents were Magdalene du Pratt du Clareau and Peter Abraham Maseres, physician. The Maseres family (Masères) were French Protestants who left France after the revocation of Edict of Nantes in 1685. He was fluent in French. He had a brother, named Peter.

He studied in Rev. Richard Wooddeson's School in Kingston-upon-Thames, then entered Clare College, Cambridge, where he obtained a Bachelor of Arts (1752) and a Master of Arts (1755). He entered the Inner Temple to study law in 1750, and was admitted to the bar in 1758.

On 4 March 1766, he was appointed attorney general of the new British Province of Quebec, the former French Canada conquered in 1760 and definitively ceded by France through the Treaty of Paris in 1763. He was sworn in office on 26 September 1766 and exercised his functions until the autumn of 1769.

In March 1768, the Carleton government requested of him a report on the reform of the province's law system. He submitted his report in February 1769.

Upon his return to London, he continued to take interest in American colonial affairs. In an essay published in 1770, he recommended that the colonies be represented as quickly as possible in the House of Commons. He was elected member of the Royal Society of London in 1771 and made cursitor baron of the exchequer in August 1773. He was elected senior judge of sheriff’s court in London in 1780.

He involved himself in the movement for a constitutional reform of Quebec which resumed at full speed with the end of the American War of Independence in 1783, and which was concluded with the adoption of the Constitutional Act of 1791 by the British Parliament. He espoused the cause of Pierre du Calvet who intended to bring governor Frederick Haldimand before the courts for violating the British constitution.

He was interested in mathematics, but he maintained a very conservative stance on the subject. He had written his Dissertation on the use of the negative sign in algebra in 1758. This took a strictly nominalistic view of algebraic operations, saying that negatives were invalid "in any other light than as the mark of subtraction of a lesser quantity from a greater." Maseres subsidized many mathematical publications and, in particular, John Hellins's multi-volume edition of John Colson's translation of Maria Gaetana Agnesi's Instituzioni analitiche ad uso della gioventù italiana. This translation was valuable for British mathematics, but Maseres also influenced British mathematics negatively by attacking calculus and other advanced mathematical methods.

He died unmarried at his country house of Reigate on 19 May 1824, at the age of 93 years.

== Works ==
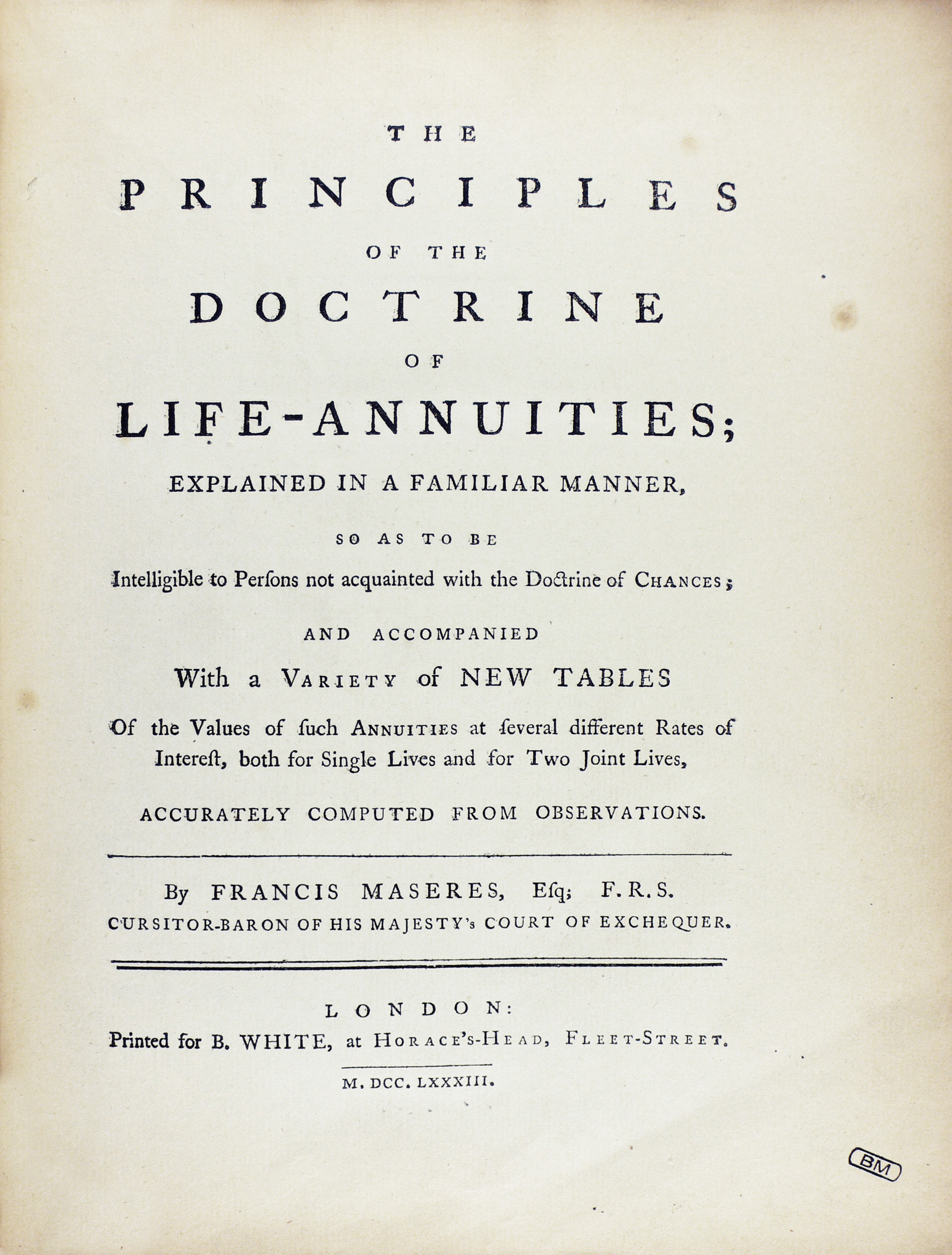
The principles of the doctrine of life-annuities, 1783.

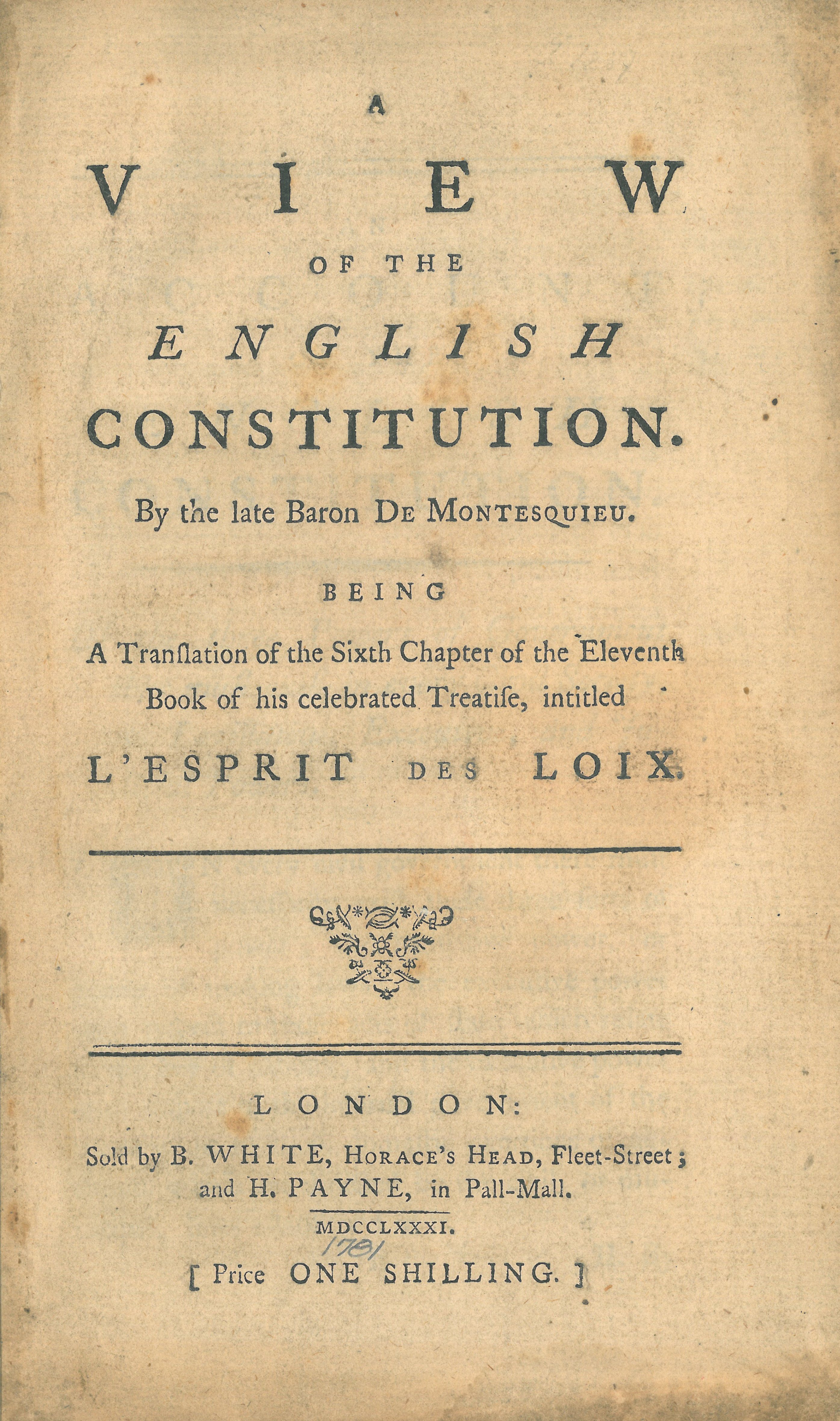
The title page of A View of the English Constitution (1st ed., 1781), a translation by Maseres of part of Montesquieu's De l'esprit des loix (The Spirit of the Laws)

- A Dissertation On the Use of the Negative Sign in Algebra; ..., 1758
- Elements of Plane Trigonometry:..., London, 1760 (online)
- Criminal Libel and the Duty of Juries, London, 1764 with Joseph Towers (online)
- Considerations on the Expediency of Procuring an Act of Parliament for the settlement of the province of Quebec, London, 1766
- Considérations sur la nécessité de faire voter un acte par le parlement pour régler les difficultés survenues dans la province de Québec, London, 1766 (online)
- Considerations on the Expediency of Admitting Representatives from the American Colonies into the British House of Commons, London, 1770
- A Collection of Several Commissions, and Other Public Instruments, Proceeding from His Majesty's Royal Authority, and Other Papers, Relating to the State of the Province in Quebec in North America, Since the Conquest of it by the British Arms in 1760, 1772 (online)
- A Draught of an Act of Parliament for Tolerating the Roman Catholick Religion in the Province of Quebec, and for Encouraging the Protestant Religion Into the Said Province..., London, 1772
- Draught of An Act of Parliament for Settling the Laws of the Province of Quebec, London, 1772
- A Proposal for Establishing Life-Annuities in Parishes for the Benefit of the Industrious Poor, London, 1772
- Mémoire à la défense d'un plan d'acte de parlement pour l'établissement des loix de la province de Québec [...], London, 1773
- Réponse aux observations faites par Mr. François Joseph Cugnet, secrétaire du gouverneur & Conseil de la province de Québec pour la langue françoise, sur le plan d'acte de parlement pour l'établissement des lois de la ditte province [...], London, 1773
- An Account of the Proceedings of the British, and other Protestant Inhabitants, of the Province of Quebeck, in North America, in Order to Obtain An House of Assembly in that Province, London, 1775
- Additional Papers Concerning the Province of Quebeck: Being An Appendix to the Book Entitled, "An Account of the Proceedings of the British and Other Protestant Inhabitants of the Province of Quebeck in North America in Order to Obtain a House of Assembly in that Province", London, 1776
- The Canadian Freeholder: In Two Dialogues Between an Englishman and a Frenchman, Settled in Canada..., London, 1777–1779 (vol. I, II and III)
- Charles-Louis de Secondat, baron de Montesquieu; Francis Masères, transl. (1781), A View of the English Constitution. By the late Baron de Montesquieu. Being a Translation of the Sixth Chapter of the Eleventh Book of his Celebrated Treatise, Intitled L'Esprit des loix, London: Sold by B. White, Horace's Head, Fleet-Street; and H. Payne, in Pall-Mall, OCLC 642722808
- The Principles of the Doctrine of Life-Annuities;..., 1783 (online)
- Questions, sur lesquelles on souhaite de sçavoir les réponses de Monsieur Adhémar et de Monsieur de Lisle, et d'autres habitants de la province de Québec, London, 1784
- The Case of Peter Du Calvet, Esq., of Montreal in the Province of Quebeck: Containing (amongst other things worth notice), An Account of the Long and Severe Imprisonment He Suffered in the Said Province..., London, 1784 [written with Pierre du Calvet] (online)
- A Review of the Government and Grievances of the Province of Quebec, Since the Conquest of it by the British Arms, London, 1788
- Answer to an Introduction to the Observations Made by the Judges of the Court of Common Pleas, London, 1790
- Observations on Tithes .... By William Hales...To Which is Added a Second Edition of The Moderate Reformer..., London, 1794 (online)
- The Principles of Algebra by William Frend, London, 1796 (online) [Appendix by Francis Maseres]
- The Doctrine of Permutations and Combinations:..., London, 1795 (online)
- Tracts on the Resolution of Affected Algebräick Equations by Dr. Halley's, Mr. Raphson's, and Sir Isaac Newton's, Methods of Approximation, London, 1800 (online) [with Edmond Halley, William Frend, and John Kersey]
- Scriptores logarithmici or, A collection of several curious tracts on the nature and construction of logarithms, 1791–1807, 6 volumes, London
- Occasional Essays on Various Subjects: Chiefly Political and Historical..., London, 1809 (online)
- The History of the Parliament of England... by Thomas May, London, 1812 [preface by Francis Maseres]
- Select Tracts Relating to the Civil Wars in England, in the Reign of King Charles the First: by Writers Who Lived in the Time of Those Wars and Were Witnesses of the Events Which They Describe, London, 1815 [as publisher]
- The Maseres Letters, 1766–1768, Toronto, 1919 (online)

== Freemasonry ==
In 1756 in Montréal, together with a coven of jurists and scholars, he founded a lodge that would later go down in history as Masarez (Mispronunciation of the founder's name, due to the oral handing down of codes), which would operate for several decades, on Canadian as well as British soil.
