= Constitution of 1791 =

Constitution of 1791 may refer to:

- Constitution of May 3, 1791, adopted by the Polish–Lithuanian Commonwealth
- French Constitution of 1791, adopted on 3 September 1791

== See also ==
- Constitutional Act 1791, by the Parliament of Great Britain
