= Quebec County (Province of Canada electoral district) =

Electoral district in former Province of Canada

Coordinates: 46.8165°N 71.2741°W

Quebec County Canada East
Province of Canada electoral district

Defunct pre-Confederation electoral district
- Legislature: Legislative Assembly of the Province of Canada
- District created: 1841
- District abolished: 1867
- First contested: 1841
- Last contested: 1863

Quebec County (French: Comté de Québec) was an electoral district of the Legislative Assembly of the Parliament of the Province of Canada, in Canada East, surrounding Quebec City. It was created in 1841 and was based on the previous electoral district of the same name for the Legislative Assembly of Lower Canada.

Quebec County was represented by one member in the Legislative Assembly. It was abolished in 1867, upon the creation of Canada and the province of Quebec.

== Boundaries ==
Quebec County surrounded the municipality of Quebec, but also included some portions of the municipality. The Governor General, Lord Sydenham, drew the boundaries of the Quebec City electoral district to exclude francophone Canadiens, strengthening the influence of voters of British extraction, an example of a linguistic and ethnic gerrymander. He did so to win as much support as possible for the recent union of the two former provinces into the Province of Canada, and for his government. The excluded areas became part of Quebec County.

The Union Act, 1840 had merged the two provinces of Lower Canada and Upper Canada into the Province of Canada, with a single Parliament. The separate parliaments of Lower Canada and Upper Canada were abolished. The Union Act provided that the pre-existing electoral boundaries of Lower Canada and Upper Canada would continue to be used in the new Parliament, unless altered by the Union Act itself.

The Union Act did not directly amend the boundaries of the Quebec County electoral district, so the boundaries of the former Quebec County district continued to be the basis for the new electoral district. Those boundaries had been set by a statute of Lower Canada in 1829:

The County of Quebec shall be bounded on the north east by the south west bounds of the seigniory of Cote de Beaupré until it meets the south east boundary line of the Township of Tewkesbury, thence north easterly along the said south east boundary line to the south east angle of the said Township, thence northward along the north east boundary or lateral line of the said Township to its depth, and from thence by the prolongation of the said line on the south west by the said County of Portneuf, on the north west by the northern boundary of the Province, and on the south east by the River Saint Lawrence; which County so bounded comprises the seigniories of Beauport, Notre Dame des Anges, Dorsainville, Lepinay, fief Saint Ignace, fief Hubert, and the seigniories of Sillery and Saint Gabriel, and the Townships of Stoneham and Tewkesbury and the Parishes of Beauport, Charlesbourg, Saint Ambroise, Jeune Lorette, part of Ancienne Lorette and Sainte Foi, and the Parish, City and Suburbs of Quebec, and all the Parishes in the whole or in part comprehended within the above described limits of the said County.

While the boundaries of Quebec County were not directly affected by the Union Act, that Act gave the Governor General the power to draw the boundaries for the Quebec City electoral district. Lord Sydenham did so by a proclamation issued just before the first general election, which started in March, 1841. His overall goal in drawing the boundaries was to ensure that supporters of the creation of the new Province of Canada and of his government would be elected. The boundaries did not follow the normal municipal boundaries, rather being drawn along certain streets and geographic features. This new electoral district was designed to exclude as many francophone Canadien voters as possible, and to include as many voters of British background as possible, since they generally supported the union and Lord Sydenham's government. It was an example of an ethnic and linguistic gerrymander. The areas of the municipality of Quebec which were not included in the new electoral district of Quebec City instead were included in Quebec County. The result was the effective disenfranchisement of Quebec francophone voters in the 1841 election.

== Members of the Legislative Assembly ==
Quebec County was a single-member constituency.

The following were the members of the Legislative Assembly for Quebec County. "Party" was a fluid concept, especially during the early years of the Province of Canada. Party affiliations are based on the biographies of individual members given by the National Assembly of Quebec, as well as votes in the Legislative Assembly.

Parliament	Members	Years in Office	Party
1st Parliament; 1841-1844	John Neilson	1841–1844	Anti-unionist; French-Canadian Group

== Abolition ==
The district was abolished on July 1, 1867, when the British North America Act, 1867 came into force, creating Canada and splitting the Province of Canada into Quebec and Ontario. It was succeeded by electoral districts of the same name in the House of Commons of Canada and the Legislative Assembly of Quebec.
