= Michel Bastarache dit Basque =

Michel Bastarache dit Basque (7 February 1730 – 15 January 1820) is notable in Canadian history for his role in the expulsion of the Acadians from New Brunswick. More specifically he was part of the expulsion from the Fort Beauséjour area (near Sackville, N.B.). He, and some of his family, became renowned for their bravery during this period.

Michel and his brother Pierre were part of a contingent of 960 Acadians sent to South Carolina in 1755. The next year about a dozen of this group, including Pierre, escaped and headed north on foot. They reached Lake Ontario, were captured by Iroquois, and ransomed by a fur trader who took them to Quebec, where they arrived in September 1756. There they were questioned by Governor Vaudreuil.

The brothers went to Panaccadie, New Brunswick, where a few Acadian families were in hiding. Bastarache learned that his wife had fled to Île Saint-Jean (Prince Edward Island). He brought his wife and children back to New Brunswick where they went into hiding again, where Pierre Du Calvet made note of them living in 1761. They and four children were prisoners at Fort Cumberland in 1763. A large number of families requested deportation to France but were refused permission to leave as they were considered British subjects.

The family eventually were allowed to stay and the long line of the Bastarache family continues to this day.
