= Tommy Schnurmacher =

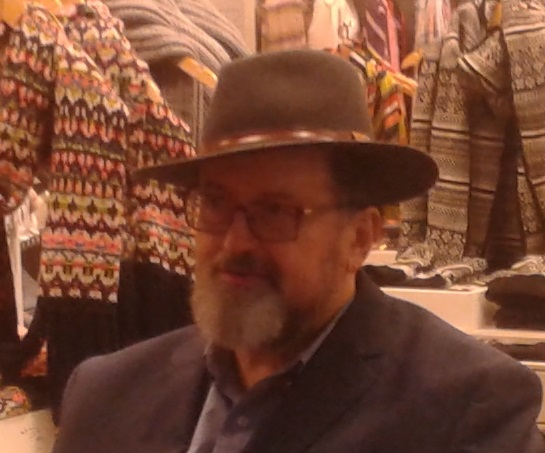
Tommy Schnurmacher photographed in Montréal, Québec, Canada at the Indigo Bookstore of Place Montréal Trust.

Tommy Schnurmacher is a Canadian former radio talk-show host, journalist and political commentator. He was the host of "The Tommy Schnurmacher Show" on CJAD-AM in Montreal, Quebec. From 1996 to 2017 he hosted a talk show airing weekday mornings from 9 o'clock until noon on CJAD, and continues to occasionally return as a guest commentator.

He won a Gold Ribbon Award in 1997 from the Canadian Association of Broadcasters for a bilingual open-line show he hosted with Gilles Proulx. He also has hosted a cross-country radio show with former Prime Minister Kim Campbell.

Year	Film	Role	Notes
2000	2001: A Space Travesty	Conductor James Levine	

== See also ==
- Talk Radio Tommy
