= William Brown (journalist) =

Canadian journalist

William Brown (1737–1789) was a Canadian journalist and the co-founder of the Quebec Gazette.

He was born in Scotland. He arrived in Quebec City on 30 September 1763, a week before the Province of Quebec was declared by the British.
