= Constitutional Act 1791 =

Act of the Parliament of Great Britain creating Lower and Upper Canada

Constitutional Act 1791 (Note: The citation of this act by this short title was authorised by section 1 of, and the first schedule to, the Short Titles Act 1896. Due to the repeal of those provisions it is now authorised by section 19(2) of the Interpretation Act 1978.)
- Act of Parliament
- Parliament of Great Britain
- Long title: An Act to repeal certain Parts of an Act, passed in the fourteenth Year of his Majesty's Reign, intituled, An Act for making more effectual Provision for the Government of the Province of Quebec, in North America; and to make further Provision for the Government of the said Province.
- Citation: 31 Geo. 3. c. 31
- Territorial extent: (Kingdom of Great Britain) Lower Canada; (Kingdom of Great Britain) Upper Canada

Dates
- Royal assent: 10 June 1791
- Commencement: 10 August 1790 (Note: Start of session.)
- Repealed: 10 March 1966
Other legislation
Amends	Quebec Act 1774
Amended by	Act of Union 1840; Statute Law Revision Act 1871; Statute Law Revision Act 1872; Statute Law Revision Act 1888; Statute Law Revision Act 1950
Repealed by	Statute Law Revision Act 1966
Relates to	Customs Act 1826

Status: Repealed

Text of statute as originally enacted

The Constitutional Act 1791 (31 Geo. 3. c. 31) (French: Acte constitutionnel de 1791) was an act of the Parliament of Great Britain which was passed during the reign of George III. The act divided the old Province of Quebec into Lower Canada and Upper Canada, each with its own parliament and government. It repealed the Quebec Act 1774 (14 Geo. 3. c. 83). The act remained in force until 1841, when it was largely repealed by the Act of Union 1840 (3 & 4 Vict. c. 35), which reunited the two provinces into the new Province of Canada. Some provisions relating to the clergy reserves remained in force. The remaining provisions of the act were repealed over time, with final repeal as a matter of British law in 1966.

== History ==
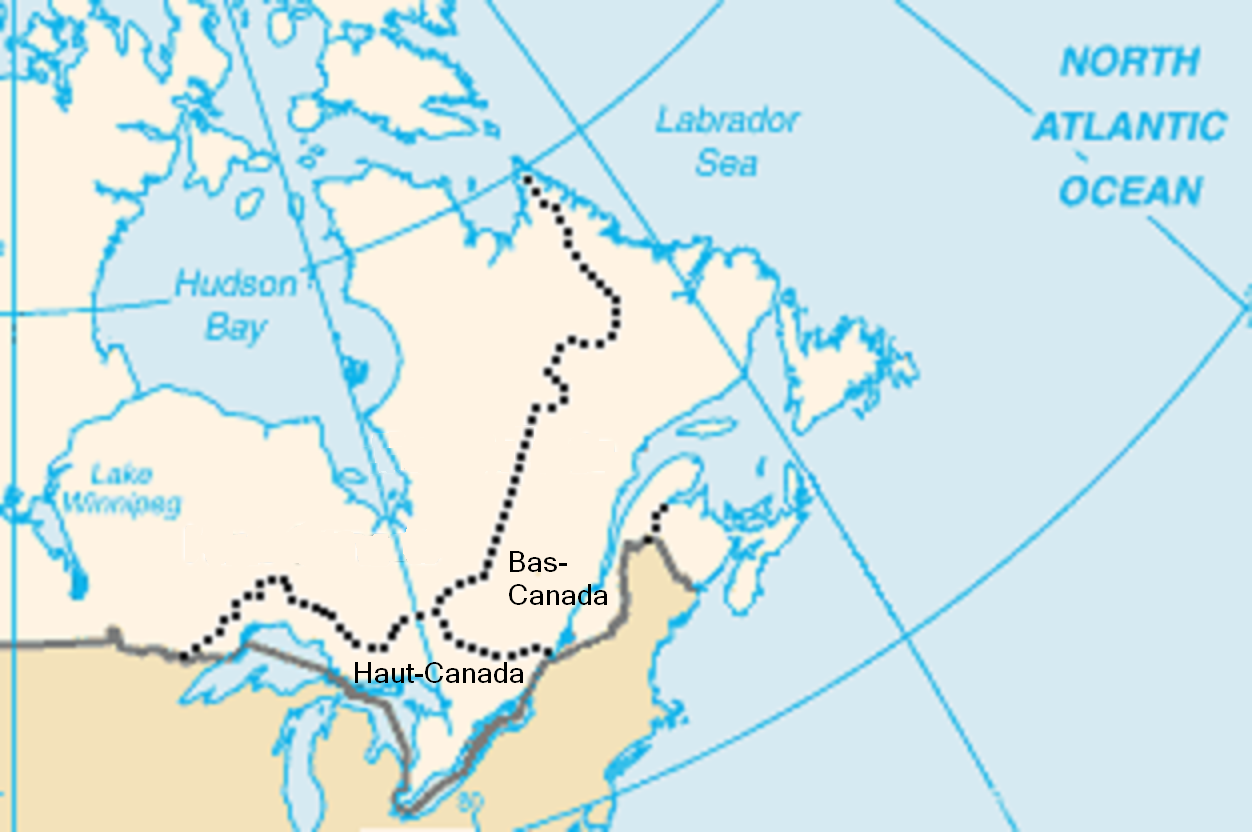
The two Canadas after the enactment of this act.

The act reformed the government of the Province of Quebec (1763–1791) to accommodate, amongst other Loyalists, the 10,000 United Empire Loyalists who had arrived from the United States following the American Revolution. The Province of Quebec, with a population of 145,000 French-speaking Canadiens, was divided in two when the act took effect on 26 December 1791. The largely unpopulated western half became Upper Canada (now southern Ontario) and the eastern half became Lower Canada (now southern Quebec). The names Upper and Lower Canada were given according to their relative elevation along the St. Lawrence River. Upper Canada received English law and institutions, while Lower Canada retained French civil law and institutions, including seigneurial land tenure and the privileges accorded to the Roman Catholic Church.

The legislative Council for the Affairs of the Province of Quebec, with its subset Executive Council cabinet, was continued and reinforced by the establishment of freeholder-elected legislative assemblies. These elected assemblies led to a form of representative government in both colonies; the Province of Quebec had not previously had a legislative assembly.

The Constitutional Act attempted to create an established church by forming the clergy reserves, that is, grants of land reserved for the support of the (Protestant) Church of England. Income from the lease or sale of these reserves, which constituted one-seventh of the territory of Upper and Lower Canada, from 1791 went exclusively to the Church of England and, from 1824 on in a complex ratio, the (Presbyterian) Church of Scotland. These reserves created many difficulties in later years, making economic development difficult and creating resentment against the Anglican church, the Family Compact, and the Château Clique, although it did eventually lead to the growth of an Ottawa neighbourhood known as The Glebe. The act was problematic for both English and French speakers; the French Canadians and the Roman Catholic church in Quebec felt they might be overshadowed by Loyalist settlements and increased rights for Protestants, while the new English-speaking settlers felt the French still had too much power. However, both groups preferred the act and the institutions it created to the Quebec Act which it replaced.

Hierarchy of power under the Constitutional Act 1791.

The act is often seen as a watershed in the development of French Canadian nationalism as it provided for a province (Lower Canada) which the French considered to be their own, separate from English-speaking Upper Canada. The disjuncture between this French-Canadian ideal of Lower Canada as a distinct, national homeland and the reality of continued Anglo-Canadian political and economic dominance of the province after 1791 led to discontent and a desire for reform among intellectual segments of the French and English of Lower Canada. The frustration of French and English Patriots over the nature of Lower Canadian political and economic life in the province fuelled the Lower Canada Rebellion of 1837–38.

== Subsequent developments ==
Most of the act was repealed by the Act of Union 1840 (3 & 4 Vict. c. 35), which merged Lower Canada and Upper Canada into the new Province of Canada. The provisions which were not repealed at that time mainly related to the clergy reserves.

The whole act, except sections 35, 38–40 and 43–45, was repealed by section 1 of, and the schedule to, the Statute Law Revision Act 1871 (34 & 35 Vict. c. 116), which came into force on 21 August 1871.

The whole act, except sections 38–40 and 43–45, was repealed by section 1 of, and the schedule to, the Statute Law Revision Act 1872 (35 & 36 Vict. c. 63), which came into force on 6 August 1872.

Sections 38–40 of the act were repealed by section 1(1) of, and the first schedule to, the Statute Law Revision Act 1950 (14 Geo. 6. c. 6), which came into force on 23 May 1950.

The whole act was repealed as a matter of British law (but not Canadian law) by section 1 of, and the schedule to, the Statute Law Revision Act 1966, which came into force on 10 March 1966.

The act did not originally have a short title, but by custom, it became known as the Constitutional Act, 1791 in Canada. In 1896, the British Parliament authorised a short title: Clergy Endowments (Canada) Act 1791, but that short title was "without prejudice to any other mode of citation". This title was based on the fact that the provisions relating to clergy endowments were the only part of the act still in force at that time. The short title is not the common name of the act in Canada. The federal government, the Supreme Court of Canada and academics continue to refer to it as the Constitutional Act, 1791.

== See also ==
- Constitutional history of Canada
- Guy Carleton, 1st Baron Dorchester
