= Fleury Mesplet =

Canadian printer (1734–1794)

- Born: January 10, 1734; Marseille
- Died: January 24, 1794 (aged 60); Montreal, Lower Canada (now Quebec, Canada)
- Occupations: Printer, publisher
- Known for: Founding the Montreal Gazette

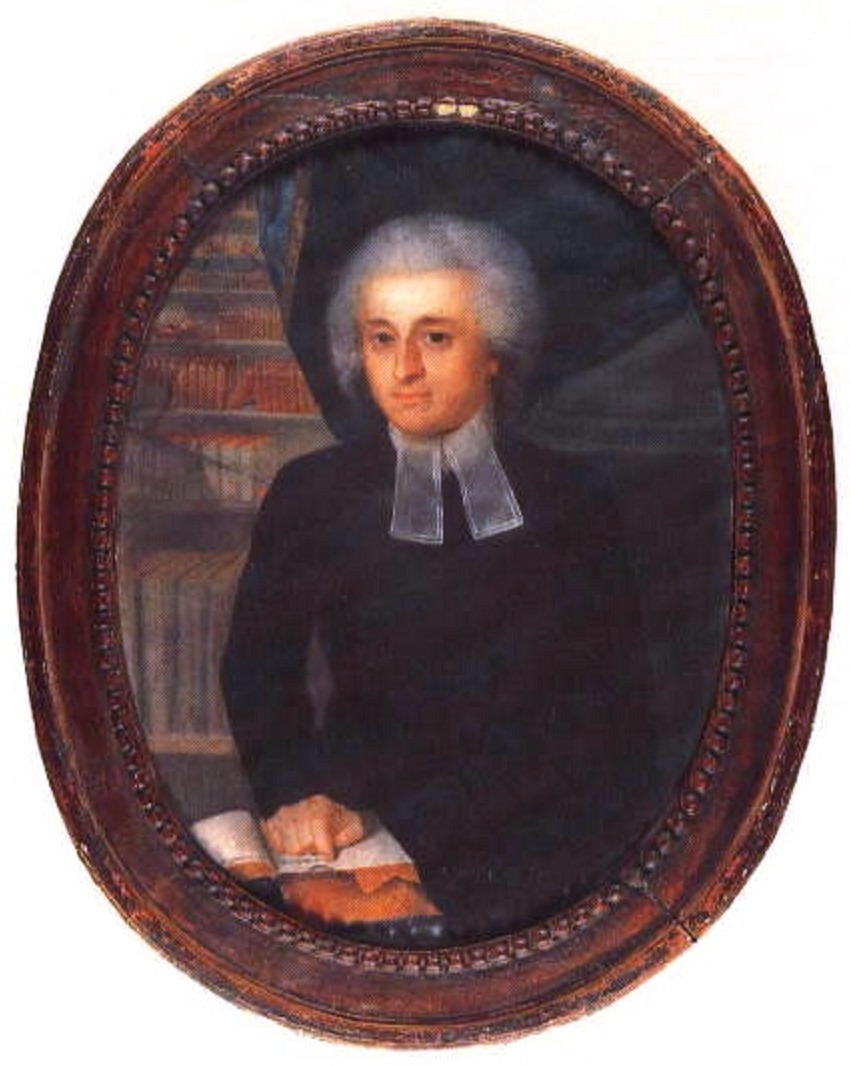
Fleury Mesplet, 1794

Fleury Mesplet (January 10, 1734 – January 24, 1794) was a French-born Canadian printer best known for founding the Montreal Gazette, Quebec's oldest daily newspaper, in 1778.

== Biography ==
Mesplet was born in Marseille, France, and was apprenticed as a printer in Lyon. He emigrated to London in 1773 where he set up shop in Covent Garden.

In 1774, he emigrated to Philadelphia; it is thought that he may have been persuaded to do so by Benjamin Franklin. In Philadelphia he again went into business as a printer, but received little work; he printed the Lettre adressée aux habitants de la province de Québec, ci-devant le Canada (Letter to the Inhabitants of Canada) for the Continental Congress in 1775, and travelled to Montreal the following year to set up a printing press in the newly captured city.

As the Americans withdrew from Montreal, he was arrested and imprisoned, but released later in the year; however, he managed to publish several works in 1776.

In 1778, he founded the Gazette Littéraire de Montréal, edited by Valentin Jautard. Both were arrested in 1779 for sedition, and imprisoned for three years; on his release, Mesplet was $5,000 in debt but quickly dealt with his creditors. In 1785, he published La Gazette de Montréal, now the Montreal Gazette, the successor to the suspended Gazette Littéraire.

In total, he published some seventy or eighty works, in French, English, Latin, and Iroquois; ten of these ran to more than a hundred pages, and another seven were almanacs.
