= Letters to the Inhabitants of Canada =

Three letters written by the First and Second Continental Congresses (1774 - 1776)

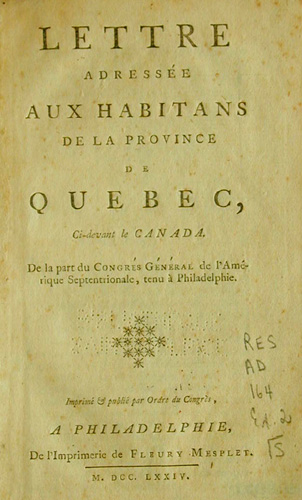
The cover sheet of Pierre Eugene du Simitiere's French translation of the letter drafted by the First Continental Congress in 1774

The Letters to the Inhabitants of Canada were three letters written by the First and Second Continental Congresses in 1774, 1775, and 1776 to communicate directly with the population of the Province of Quebec, formerly the French province of Canada, which had no representative system at the time. Their purpose was to draw the large French-speaking population to the American revolutionary cause. This goal ultimately failed, and Quebec, along with the other northern provinces of British America, remained loyal to Britain. The only significant assistance that was gained was the recruitment of two regiments totaling not more than 1,000 men.

== Background ==
The acquisition of the Province of Quebec as a result of the French and Indian War (1754–1763) gave Great Britain control over nearly the entire eastern seaboard of North America, and brought the former French colony of Canada into a closer relationship with the American colonies. The new province was significantly different from the other provinces of British America, as the vast majority of people in Quebec spoke only French and were Catholic. There were also differences in civic and legal affairs, as the law had, prior to the British conquest, been based on French law.

In 1774, the British Parliament enacted the Quebec Act, along with other legislation that was labeled by American colonists as the Intolerable Acts. This measure, which replaced the Royal Proclamation of 1763 as the governing document of Quebec, was used to fortify the position of the British in Quebec by guaranteeing (among other things) the rights of French Canadians to practice Catholicism. It is largely perceived by historians to be damage control in the province of Quebec, in order to prevent the French Canadians from joining the rebellion in the American colonies. The American colonists interpreted the religious provisions concerning Catholicism as a wedge by which Catholicism might be introduced into all of the colonies, and other provisions concerning the structure of the Quebec government to be an attempt by the British Parliament to assert more control over the province, and deny its people what many considered to be basic rights.

== First letter ==
=== Congress drafts the letter ===
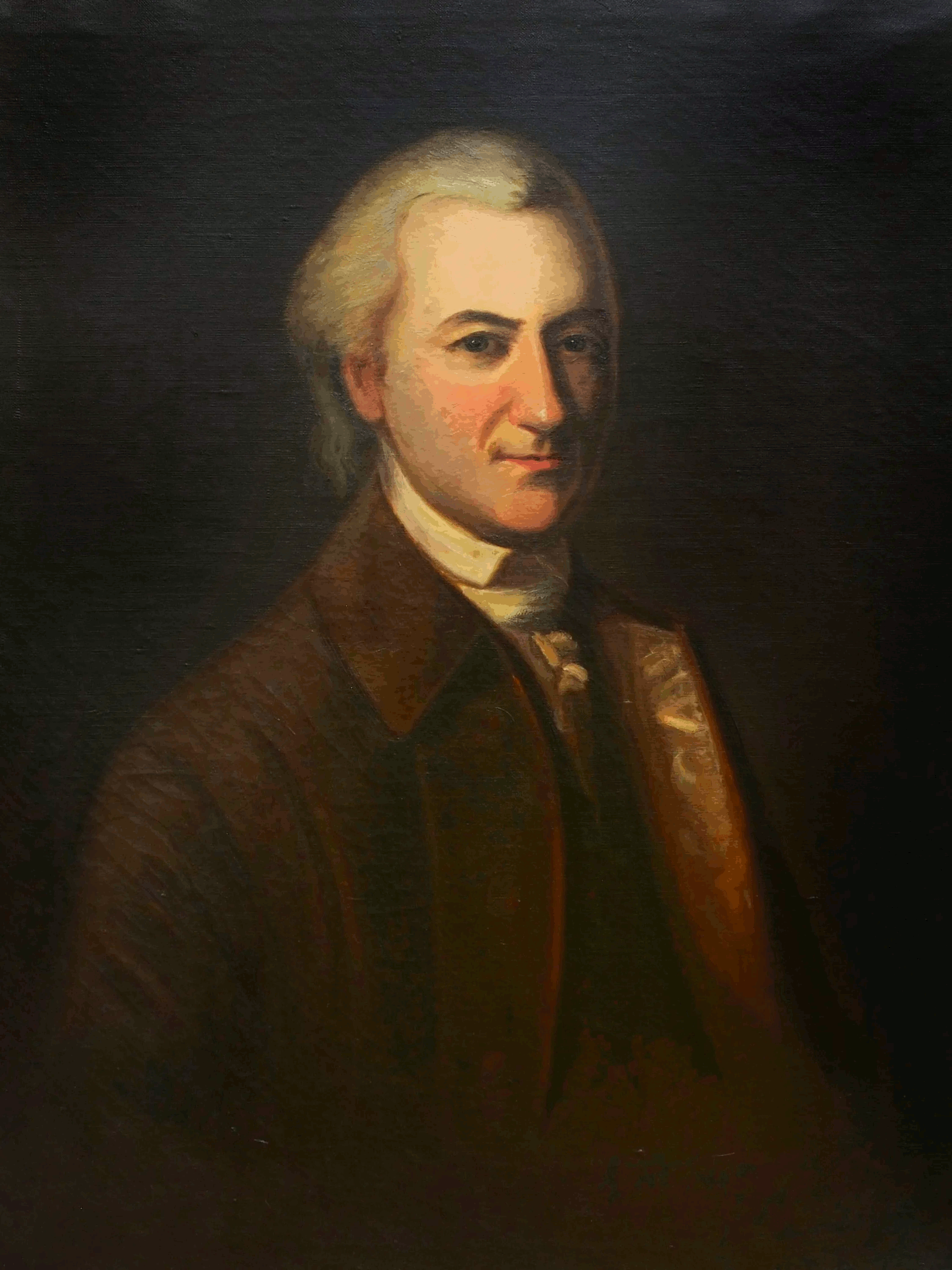
John Dickinson, author of the first letter

On October 21, 1774, the First Continental Congress, meeting to craft a united response to the Intolerable Acts, resolved to address letters to the populations of Quebec, St. John's Island, Nova Scotia, Georgia, East Florida, and West Florida, all being colonies that were not represented by delegates in the Congress. A committee composed of Thomas Cushing, Richard Henry Lee, and John Dickinson was set up to draft those letters. A first draft was presented on October 24, debated and returned to the committee. On October 26, a new draft was presented, debated, amended and adopted. A resolution was passed for the president to sign the letter and ordering the translation and printing of a Letter to the Inhabitants of the Province of Quebec to be done under the supervision of the delegates of Pennsylvania. The letter was translated to French and printed as an 18-page brochure entitled Lettre adressée aux habitans de la Province de Québec, ci-devant le Canada, de la part du Congrès général de l'Amérique Septentrionale, tenu à Philadelphie. The translation is attributed to Pierre Eugene du Simitiere. The final content of the letter is attributed to John Dickinson, as a draft in his own hand very closely resembles the final letter.

=== Contents of the first letter ===
The letter informed the people of Quebec of five important rights of British constitutional law which were not in force in their colony over a decade after the peace treaty of 1763, which ended the French and Indian War, and resulted in every French subject in Canada becoming a new British subject, theoretically equal in rights to all other British subjects. These five rights were representative government, trial by jury, habeas corpus, land ownership, and freedom of the press. The text quotes a passage of Cesare Beccaria's On Crimes and Punishments and multiple excerpts of Montesquieu's The Spirit of Laws. Quebec historian Marcel Trudel believes this first letter to have been "a crash course on democratic government", while Gustave Lanctôt claims that the Congress' letter "introduced [among the inhabitants] the notion of personal liberty and political equality.", calling it their first "political alphabet" and "first lesson in constitutional law".

The people of Quebec were invited to give themselves the provincial representation the Quebec Act did not provide for, and have this representative body send delegates to the upcoming continental Congress, to be held in Philadelphia on May 10, 1775.

=== Distribution and reaction to the first letter ===
The French-born Philadelphia printer Fleury Mesplet printed 2,000 copies of the French translation. Other manuscript French translations of the original English letter (first published in Dunlap's Pennsylvania Packet) were in circulation as well, possibly even arriving in Canada before the "official" translation paid by the Congress. Wide circulation of the letter was prevented by General Guy Carleton, then Governor of the province. However, he reported to his superiors in England that, "a report was spread that at Montreal that letters of importance had been received from the General Congress," and that town meetings were being held, "breathing that same spirit, so plentifully gone forth through the neighbouring Provinces." These town meetings, seemingly dominated by English-speakers, ended without the election of delegates to the Continental Congress.

In early 1775, Boston's Committee of Correspondence sent John Brown into Quebec to gather intelligence, gauge sentiment, and agitate for rebellion in that province. He found mixed sentiment among English-speaking inhabitants, some of whom were concerned that the Congress' adoption of an export boycott would essentially give the lucrative fur trade to French-speakers. The bulk of the French-speaking population was at best neutral with respect to British rule; some were happy with it, but more might be convinced to assist the Americans in their aims. Brown also noted the relatively weak military presence in the province. General Carleton, while aware of Brown's activities, did nothing to interfere, beyond preventing publication of the letter in the local newspaper.

== Second letter ==
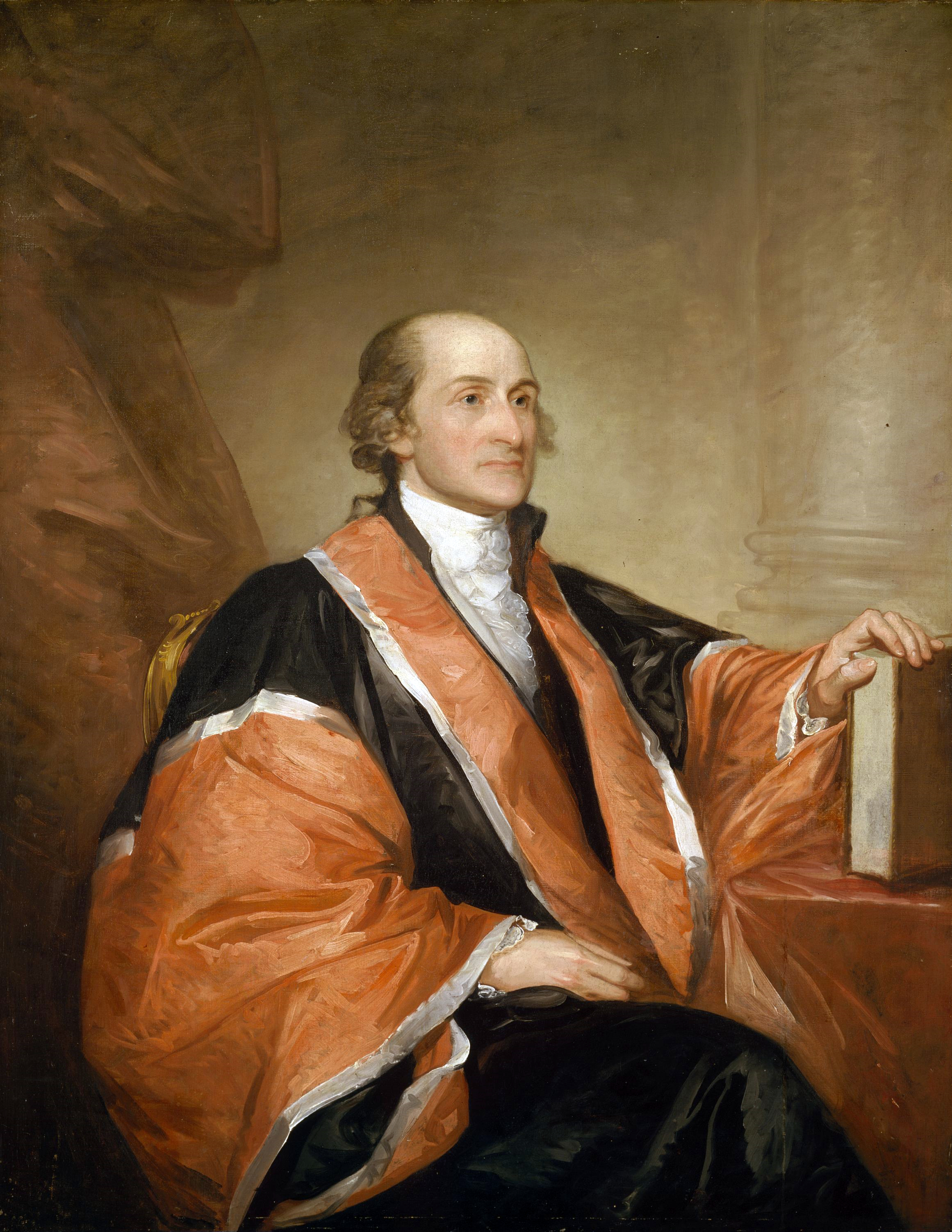
John Jay, author of the second letter

=== Drafting the second letter ===
The Second Continental Congress met on May 10, 1775, following the Battles of Lexington and Concord in which colonial forces resisted a large British force on April 19 and drove it back to Boston. This victory resulted in Congress opening the session with great excitement and hope.

John Brown arrived in Philadelphia on May 17 to report the capture of Fort Ticonderoga and the raid on Fort Saint-Jean, an event that stimulated much discussion in the Congress. On May 26, the Congress resolved to draft a second letter to the inhabitants of Canada. The committee that drafted the letter was composed of John Jay, Silas Deane, and Samuel Adams, the last having previously written a letter to the people of Canada on behalf of the Boston Committee of Correspondence. On May 29, after having heard additional testimony on the situation in Montreal from James Price, a Montreal merchant, the Second Continental Congress approved the letter.

The letter, entitled Letter to the oppressed inhabitants of Canada, was translated as Lettre adressée aux habitants opprimés de la province de Québec, de la part du Congrès général de l’Amérique septentrionale, tenu à Philadelphie. The letter was signed by President John Hancock, and again translated by Pierre Eugène du Simitière; 1,000 copies of it were printed by Fleury Mesplet. The content of the letter has been attributed to John Jay.

=== Contents of the second letter ===
In the letter, the Congress again deplored the form of the civil government introduced by the Quebec Act, which it likened to "tyranny". It further asserted that under this form of government "you and your wives and your children are made slaves." As for the enjoyment of their religion, the Congress believed it uncertain for it depended on "a legislature in which you have no share, and over which you have no controul [sic]". The Congress was clearly hoping to draw French-speaking habitants to their cause, as well as English-speaking residents that had migrated to Quebec from the other colonies.

At the time of the letter's writing, the Congress was already aware that Governor Carleton had called the people to arm themselves to defend their new King from the invasion. The letter warned the population of the danger of being sent to fight against France were it to join the war on the side of the Americans (which it eventually did in 1778). If the Congress insisted again on treating the Canadians as friends sharing common interests with the other colonists, it however warned the people not to "reduce us the disagreeable necessity of treating you as enemies."

=== Distribution and reaction to the second letter ===
Price took the letter to Montreal, along with a similar letter from the New York Provincial Congress, and circulated them in the province. Much of the English-speaking merchant class, which was dependent on the fur trade and the market for it in Europe, was wary of the situation. The French habitants were generally unswayed by appeals to English liberties, with which they had relatively little familiarity. However, they were also not overly supportive of the existing military government, as calls to arms were met with limited success. The habitants much more opportunistically were happy to follow whichever force was winning at the time, as long as they paid for their supplies.

In the end, the Americans gained limited support in Quebec, ultimately raising two regiments that participated in the Continental Army. The 1st Canadian Regiment was raised in November 1775 during the early days of the invasion of Canada, and the 2nd Canadian Regiment was raised in January 1776.

== Third letter ==
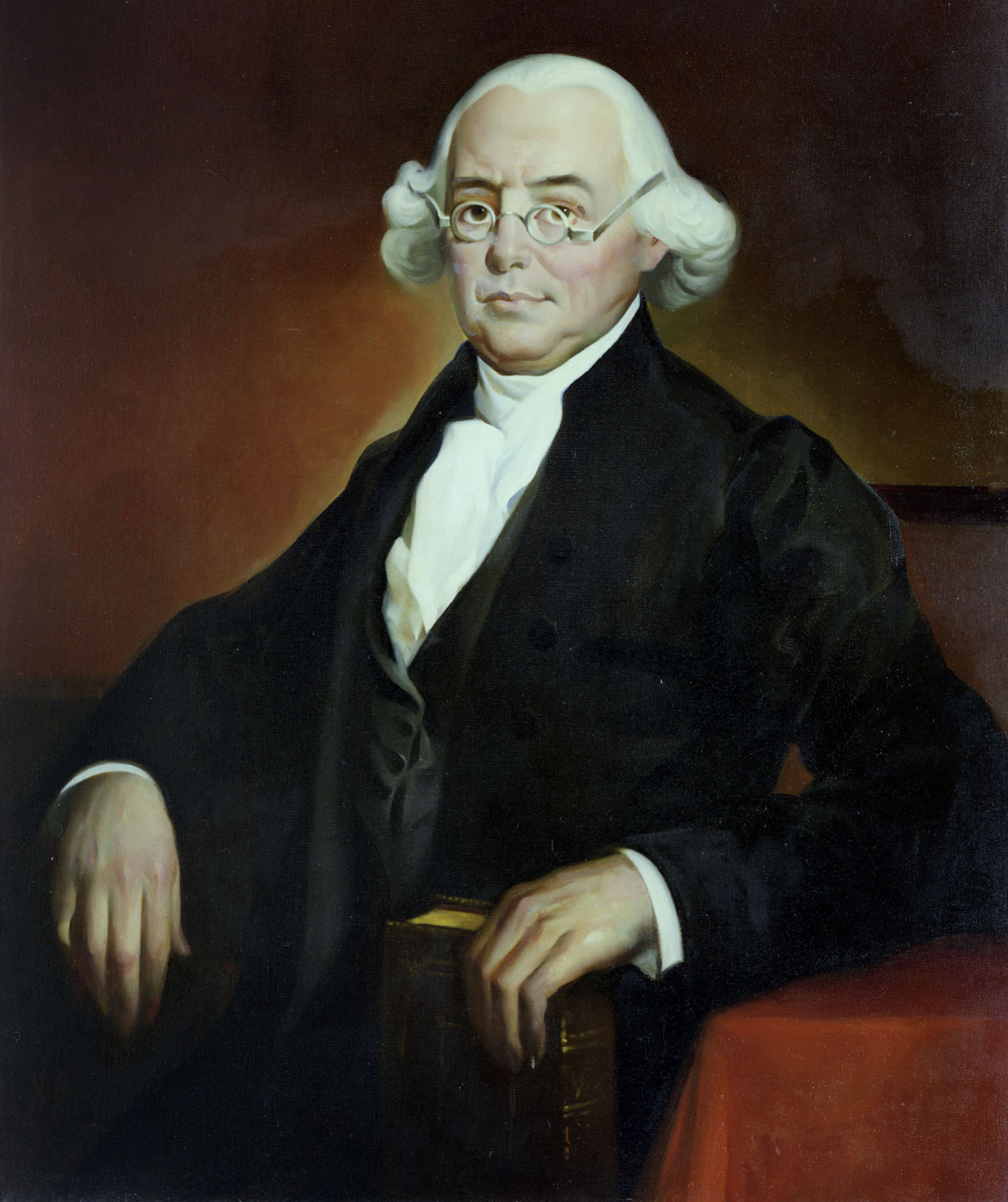
James Wilson, one of the authors of the third letter

In September 1775, after the failure of the second letter to sway public opinion, the American Colonists launched an invasion of Quebec from Fort Ticonderoga and Cambridge, Massachusetts. This invasion culminated in the Battle of Quebec at the end of December 1775, in which the city was successfully defended, and the invaders dug in for the winter. Following the battle, Moses Hazen and Edward Antill traveled from Quebec to Philadelphia to bring the news of the American defeat.

=== Drafting the third letter ===
After hearing of the defeat, the Congress, on January 23, 1776, set up a committee to which was entrusted the drafting of another letter to the Canadian population. The members of the committee this time were William Livingston, Thomas Lynch Jr, and James Wilson. The letter was approved the day after, and signed by John Hancock.

=== Contents ===
The Congress thanked the population for the services it rendered to its cause and ensured them that troops to protect them were on the way, and would arrive before British reinforcements. It also informed them that the Congress had authorized the raising of two battalions in Canada to assist in the cause. The people were once again invited to organize local and provincial assemblies, which could choose delegates to represent the province in the Continental Congress.

=== Distribution and reaction to the third letter ===
The French translation was again printed by Fleury Mesplet; however, it is not certain who in the committee is the author and also if du Simitière was the translator. Hazen and Antill delivered copies of the letter to David Wooster, commanding the colonial forces occupying Montreal. He oversaw distribution of the letter at the end of February.

The letter met with no significant response, as the populace was unhappy about being paid for supplies in paper currency, and was otherwise not enamored of the occupation by the colonial forces.

== Conclusion ==
The 1775 American invasion was a disastrous failure, with the Americans forced to retreat back to Fort Ticonderoga. The province remained in British hands, and its population centers were never threatened again in the war. The goal of these letters, and a variety of other addresses to the Canadian people, to gain political and military support for the revolution were generally not realized. While the Congress succeeded in raising two regiments of Canadians (James Livingston's 1st Canadian Regiment and Hazen's 2nd Canadian Regiment), their numbers were not as large as desired, and the seigneurs and the Catholic clergy ultimately rallied around the British governor. Quebec would remain a relatively strong colony for Britain due in large part to the strict leadership of Guy Carleton, and despite attempts to bring the revolutionary spirit of the American colonies into Quebec.

== Contents of the letters ==
English and French Wikisource have the contents of the letters:

- Letter to the Inhabitants of the Province of Quebec, October 26, 1774 (en, fr)
- Letter to the oppressed inhabitants of Canada, May 29, 1775 (en, fr)
- Letter to the Inhabitants of the Province of Canada, January 24, 1776 (en, fr)
