= Quebec Chronicle-Telegraph =

Canadian newspaper in Quebec

- Front page of the 9 March 2011 edition
- Type: Weekly newspaper
- Owner: Raymond Stanton
- Founder: William Brown
- Editor: Stacie Stanton
- Founded: 21 June 1764; 261 years ago
- Headquarters: 2600, boulevard Laurier; Suite 202; Quebec City, Quebec; G1V 4T3
- Circulation: 2,200
- ISSN: 0226-9252
- OCLC number: 11046661
- Website: The Quebec Chronicle-Telegraph

The Quebec Chronicle-Telegraph, founded by William Brown (c. 1737–1789) as the Quebec Gazette on 21 June 1764, is the oldest running newspaper in North America. It is currently published as an English language weekly from its offices in Quebec City, Quebec, Canada.

Formerly a bilingual French-English publication, the Quebec Chronicle-Telegraph celebrated its 250th anniversary in 2014.

== Origins and history ==
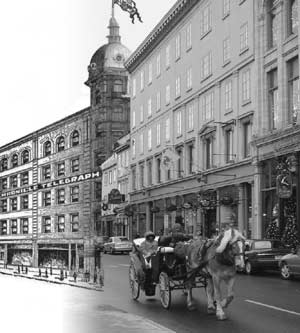
Photo montage showing Quebec Chronicle-Telegraph's old offices at 27 Buade Street. The Chronicle-Telegraph sign is hidden under an awning on du Tresor Street.

Founded as the Quebec Gazette in 1764, it is a descendant of several newspapers published during the past three centuries. Until 1842, the newspaper published editions in both French and English. At its inception it originally began as a weekly, but in May 1832, it began appearing in English on Mondays, Wednesdays and Fridays, and in French on Tuesdays, Thursdays and Saturdays. The Quebec Gazette merged with the Morning Chronicle in 1873 to become the Quebec Chronicle and Quebec Gazette.

On 25 July 1925 another merger occurred with the Quebec Daily Telegraph and the paper was then published under the banner of the Chronicle-Telegraph until 1934, when it added Quebec to its masthead, where it remains to this day.

In 1959, the paper was sold to the Thomson Publishing Group (then owned by Canadian media mogul Roy Thomson, 1st Baron Thomson of Fleet, now part of Thomson Reuters) which later sold the newspaper to publisher Herb Murphy. In 1972 it went from being a daily to its current weekly edition format. Quebec City is a virtually monolingual francophone city, and the area's anglophone population was too small for the paper to be viable as a daily. Then as now, its readership came mainly from anglophone provincial government workers and anglophone members of the National Assembly of Quebec.

The paper was sold again in 1979 to lawyers David Cannon, Jean Lemelin, Ross Rourke and broadcaster Bob Dawson, who later passed it on to David Cannon. It was then bought by Karen Macdonald and François Vézina on 1 January 1993. On 1 August 2007 it was sold to Peter White, former Hollinger executive and Mr. White sold it to Pierre Little in 2009, a New Brunswick native. In November 2010, majority shares were sold to Ray Stanton of London, Ontario.

== Claims of seniority ==
The Quebec Chronicle-Telegraph claims to be North America's oldest newspaper due to the following:

- The Maryland Gazette began publication in 1727, though it ceased publication in its tenth year and the name was only revived in 1922.
- The New Hampshire Gazette began publication on 7 October 1756 and continues as a weekly today. However, the name disappeared for a time and the new version was started from scratch by a different owner who had not purchased the paper from a previous owner.
- In Canada, the Halifax Gazette, founded in 1752, claims to be "Canada's first newspaper." However, its official descendant, the Royal Gazette, is a government publication for legal notices and proclamations rather than a proper newspaper.
- The Newport Mercury began as a weekly in 1758 and still publishes news today under the same name, ceasing publication only for a short period during the American Revolution.
- Finally, there is the Hartford Courant, founded 29 October 1764, a few months after the Quebec Chronicle-Telegraph. However, the Courant claims that it, not the Chronicle-Telegraph, is the oldest newspaper in North America, since it has never missed a day of publication since its foundation while the Chronicle-Telegraph briefly ceased publication during the 1775 Siege of Quebec.

The Quebec Chronicle-Telegraph therefore has a defendable claim to being the oldest surviving newspaper that still publishes news in Canada.

== Archive scanning partnership with Google News ==
In 2008 the Quebec Chronicle-Telegraph joined the Google News microfilm scanning project to make its newspaper archives more accessible via Google's free news archive search service.

Publisher Pierre Little stated that:

This effort will open up a new world of possibilities for today's Internet users. You can search for everything from news of loved ones of past generations to news of major historical events

and that:

... many readers visit the newspaper's Web site to look for obituaries and conduct research on their ancestors. We could envision that thousands of families would be attracted to our archives to search for people who came over to the New World. ... We hope that will be a financial windfall for us.

== See also ==
- Google News
- List of early Canadian newspapers
- List of newspapers in Canada
- List of online newspaper archives
