= Valentin Jautard =

Canadian lawyer and journalist

Valentin Jautard (c. 1738 – 8 June 1787) was a French-born Canadian lawyer and journalist. Born in Bordeaux, He is best known for his welcome of invading American troops in 1775 during the American Revolution, saying "our chains are broken, blissful liberty restores us to ourselves."

== Park ==
Place Valentin-Jautard, a small park in Montreal on Mont-Royal Avenue East, near the building of the Journal de Montreal newspaper, is named after Jautard.

== Sources ==
- ALAQ., dans le site de l'ALAQ, 2002
- Nova Doyon. « Valentin Jautard, premier critique littéraire au Québec », Cap-aux-Diamants, no 69 (printemps), 2002, page 55.
- Nova Doyon. « L’Académie de Montréal : fiction littéraire ou projet utopique ? », dans Mens, Revue d’histoire intellectuelle de l’Amérique française, vol. 1, no 2, printemps 2001, pages 115 to 140.
- Jacques G. Ruelland. Figures de la philosophie québécoise à l'époque de la Révolution française : Fleury Mesplet, Pierre du Calvet, Valentin Jautard, Pierre de Sales Laterrière, Montréal, UQAM, coll. Philosophie québécoise no P-4, 1989, 198 p.
- Jacques G. Ruelland et Jean-Paul de Lagrave. Valentin Jautard (1736–1787), premier journaliste de langue française au Canada, Sainte-Foy, Éditions Le Griffon d'argile, 1989, coll. Fleury-Mesplet, 390 p.
- Bernard Andrès. « Le fantasme du champ littéraire dans la Gazette de Montréal (1778–1779) », in Études françaises, volume 36, number 3, 2000, Les Presses de l'Université de Montréal.
