= Edward Hale (politician) =

Canadian businessman, politician and MLC

The Honourable Edward Hale D.C.L.
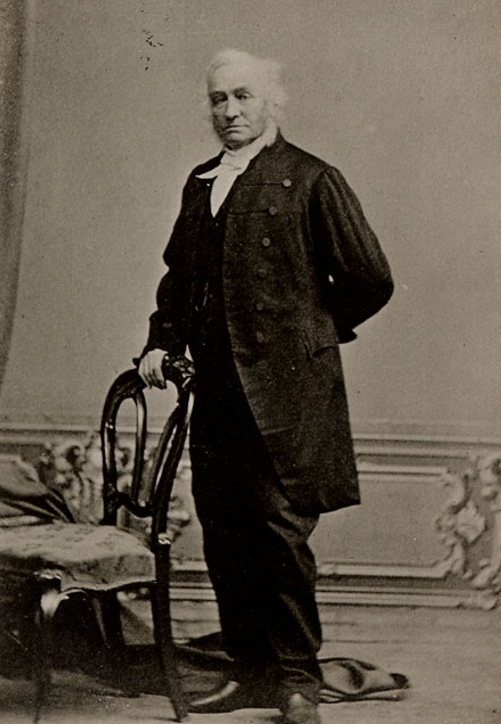

Member of the Special Council of Lower Canada
- In office September 19, 1839 – February 10, 1841
- Succeeded by: Position abolished

Warden, District Council of Sherbrooke
- In office 1840 onwards

Member of the Legislative Assembly of the Province of Canada for Sherbrooke (two elections)
- In office 1841–1848
- Preceded by: New position
- Succeeded by: Bartholomew Gugy

Member of the Legislative Council of Quebec for Wellington
- In office 1867–1875
- Preceded by: New position
- Succeeded by: William Hoste Webb

Personal details
- Born: December 6, 1800 Quebec City, Lower Canada
- Died: April 26, 1875 (aged 74) Quebec City, Quebec
- Party: Quebec: Conservative
- Spouse: Eliza Cecilia Bowen
- Relations: Lt. General William Amherst (grandfather); William Amherst, 1st Earl Amherst (uncle); Edward Hale (uncle); Edward Bowen (father-in-law); Jeffery Hale (brother)
- Children: 7
- Parent(s): John Hale and Elizabeth Amherst Hale
- Occupation: Businessman, farmer and landowner

Edward Hale, D.C.L. (December 6, 1800 – April 26, 1875) was a Quebec businessman and political figure. He was Chancellor of Bishop's University and a significant figure to Bishop's College School.

== Family and early life ==
Hale was born in Quebec City in 1800, the son of John Hale and Elizabeth Amherst Hale, who were well-connected in the colonial government and society of Lower Canada.

His father was a British army officer who had settled in Lower Canada. John Hale was appointed to the Legislative Council of Lower Canada in 1808 and served as a member until the constitution was suspended in 1838. He was also a member of the Executive Council of Lower Canada from 1820 until his death in 1838.

His mother was the sister of William Pitt Amherst, 1st Earl Amherst. Their father, Lieutenant General William Amherst, had fought for Britain in the Seven Years' War and had defeated French troops at the Battle of Signal Hill in St. John's, Newfoundland.

His paternal uncle, also named Edward Hale, was seigneur of Portneuf. He later served on the Special Council of Lower Canada, which replaced the Parliament of Lower Canada after the suspension of the constitution in 1838.

Edward Hale was educated at a private school in England, obtaining a good education. He returned to Lower Canada in 1820, where he was named secretary to the auditor general for the province. From 1823 to 1828, he was secretary to his maternal uncle, Lord Amherst, who was the Governor of the Bengal Presidency in India. He then travelled in Europe. After he returned to Lower Canada in 1831, he married Eliza Cecilia Bowen, the daughter of Edward Bowen, a former member of the Legislative Assembly of Lower Canada and later judge of the Court of King's Bench. The couple had seven children.

== Business, agricultural and educational interests ==
Hale and his wife settled on a property in the Sherbrooke area, on the Saint-François River in the Eastern Townships, around 1834. He was active in agriculture in the area, and gradually acquired significant land-holdings. He was also involved in business developments. He was a shareholder in the British American Land Company which was established to sell land in that part of the province.

Hale was also president of the Stanstead and Sherbrooke Mutual Fire Insurance Company. Along with Alexander Tilloch Galt, also of Sherbrooke, Hale was involved in the establishment of the St. Lawrence and Atlantic Railroad, linking Montreal to Portland, Maine. The railway ran through the Eastern Townships and Hale was on the sub-committee planning the local route.

In 1866, he was named chancellor for Bishop's College, a post previously held by his father-in-law, Judge Bowen. The appointment was in recognition of the services he had provided to the Church of England in the Sherbrooke area. He was also a founder of Bishop's College School. He was also on the administrative board of the Jeffrey Hale Hospital, which his brother had established in his will.

== Political career ==
=== Lower Canada ===
In November 1837, the Lower Canada Rebellion broke out. Hale served as secretary to the colonel of the local Sherbrooke militia during the rebellion, but did not participate in any of the military engagements.

In March 1838, the British government suspended the provincial government of Lower Canada, under the authority of an act passed by the British Parliament. For the next two years, Lower Canada was governed by the Governor General, assisted by the Special Council of Lower Canada, whose members were appointed by the Governor General. Hale was considered a leading local figure from Sherbrooke and was appointed to the Special Council in September 1839. His uncle Edward Hale was also a member of the Special Council at the same time.

The British government was considering re-unifying Lower Canada and Upper Canada into a single province. As a member of the Special Council, Hale voted in favour of the resolutions calling for the re-unification. Since the Parliament had been suspended, the issue of re-unification was never proposed to the elected members.

During the period of government by the Special Council, the Governor General, Lord Sydenham, created a system of local governance by municipal districts. Each district had an elected council, chaired by a warden appointed by the Governor General. The districts were responsible for municipal governance and education. In 1840, Sydenham appointed Hale the warden of the Sherbrooke district. His correspondence from the time showed that he discharged his duties diligently.

=== Province of Canada ===
Following the rebellion in Lower Canada, and the similar rebellion in 1837 in Upper Canada (now Ontario), the British government decided to merge the two provinces into a single province, as recommended by Lord Durham in the Durham Report. The Union Act, 1840, passed by the British Parliament, abolished the two provinces and their separate parliaments. It created the Province of Canada, with a single Parliament for the entire province, composed of an elected Legislative Assembly and an appointed Legislative Council. The Governor General initially retained a strong position in the government.

Hale was apparently encouraged to stand for election to the Legislative Assembly in the new Parliament. His opponent was Colonel Bartholomew Gugy. Both men were supporters of the union and the government of Lord Sydenham. Gugy tried to persuade Hale to abandon the campaign, but Hale persisted and was elected to the Assembly, for Sherbrooke.

In the first session of the Parliament, the major issue was the union of the Canadas. The leader of the French-Canadian Group, John Neilson, introduced a resolution condemning the way union had been imposed on Lower Canada. The Neilson motion was defeated in the Assembly. Hale was one of the members who supported the union and voted against the resolution. Throughout the first Parliament, Hale was a consistent supporter of the Governor General. He criticised proposals for greater control of the government by the Assembly, particularly in 1842 when the ministry was reconstituted in 1842 with a stronger Reform balance and an aim of greater control of government by the Assembly.

Hale was re-elected by acclamation in 1844. He continued to be a consistent supporter of the Governor General, in the group called "British" Tories. He was diligent in his attendance and participation in the affairs of the Assembly, but found that his business interests suffered by his lengthy absences, first in Kingston, later in Montreal. In 1847 he announced that he would not stand for election in the 1848 election. Col. Gugy was elected in his place.

=== Quebec Legislative Council ===
In 1867, Confederation created Canada, and divided the Province of Canada into Quebec and Ontario, each with its own parliament. Hale was named to the Legislative Council of Quebec for the Wellington division, sitting as a Conservative. He served until his death at Quebec City in 1875. He was buried in Sherbrooke.

== See also ==
- 1st Parliament of the Province of Canada
- 2nd Parliament of the Province of Canada
