= Charest =

Charest may refer to:

- Charest (surname)
- Charest River, a tributary of the Sainte-Anne River in Quebec, Canada
- Lake Charest (Mékinac), in Québec, Canada
- Autoroute Charest, a superhighway located in Quebec City, Canada
