= Saint-Anne Seignorial Estate =

Coordinates: 46.5678°N 72.1911°W

The Saint-Anne Seignorial Estate (French: Domaine seigneurial Sainte-Anne) is a historic manorial estate located in Sainte-Anne-de-la-Perade, Quebec, on the north shore of the St. Lawrence River, in Mauricie, Quebec, Canada.

It includes the ruins of the old manor house. In 2010, it was named a Heritage Site by the municipality of Sainte-Anne-de-la-Perade.

Since 2003, it has presented a permanent exhibition "When the story is told ..." (French: Quand l'histoire se raconte...). This exhibition traces the story of three famous people who lived in the Domaine seigneurial: Madeleine de Verchères, heroine of Fort Verchères; the artist Elizabeth Hale, wife of politician John Hale; and Honoré Mercier, Premier of Quebec from 1887 to 1891.

Since 1995, the site has been run by the "Society of Madeleine Verchères site" (French: Société du site Madeleine de Verchères). The mission of the hosts is to conserve, manage, facilitate and promote the historical site. Every summer, a temporary art exhibition is also presented in the lobby of the "manorial Domaine Sainte-Anne".

== See also ==
- Lordship of Sainte-Anne-de-la-Perade
