= Joseph-Louis d'Haussonville =

French army officer

Lieutenant General Joseph-Louis d'Haussonville
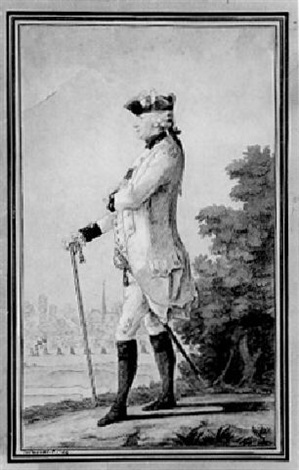
- Born: March 6, 1737; Nancy, France
- Died: November 1, 1806 (aged 69)
- Rank: Lieutenant General
- Awards: Order of the Holy Spirit

Joseph-Louis de Cléron, Comte d'Haussonville (1737-1806) was a French army officer who successfully captured St. John's from British forces in 1762 during the Seven Years' War.

== Biography ==
On June 20, 1762, Comte d'Haussonville landed in St. John's and successfully took it over. On September 13, William Amherst's fleet landed in Torbay and marched to Signal Hill.

On September 15, Comte d'Haussonville and the French forces fought the English upon Signal Hill. The French forces would lose the battle and flee the city. The battle was the last in the North American theater of the Seven Years' War.

Back in France, he was promoted to Maréchal de camp in 1776. From 1778, he served with this rank in the Army of the Coasts of Brittany and Normandy.

In 1780, he was appointed Grand Louvetier of France. He was the last to hold this position until the Revolution.
In 1784, he was promoted to the rank of Lieutenant General of the King's Armies..

=== Marriage and children ===
In 1768 he was married to Antoinette-Marie de Régnier, daughter of Claude Louis François Régnier de Guerchy
They had 5 children :

- Bernard Gabriel Gaspard (1769-1770)
- Charles Louis Bernard (1770–1846), chamberlain at the court of Napoleon I
- Louise Charlotte (1773-1853), married with Anne Charles de Clermont, marquis de Montoison. Had issue.
- Adélaïde Françoise Louise (1784-1824), married with Louis Henri Casimir de Laguiche. Had issue.
- Marie Anne Victoire (died 1826), married with Gabriel Joseph Elzéar de Rosières, marquis de Sorans. Had issue.
