= John Hale (Canadian politician) =

Canadian politician

John Hale (1765 – 24 December 1838) was a member of the Legislative Council of Lower Canada.

He was born in England. John Hale was the first born son of General John Hale, who fought with Major General James Wolfe at The Battle of Quebec 1759. He entered into the Royal Marines in 1776 and became a lieutenant in the 2nd Foot Regiment in 1779, and then captain. He was the military secretary of Prince Edward Augustus and accompanied him to Halifax, Nova Scotia. After a brief return to England, he went to Quebec City in 1799 and eventually became inspector-general of public accounts in 1807. In 1819 he acquired the seigneurie of Sainte-Anne-de-La-Pérade. He was president of a bank from 1821 to 1823.

In 1799, he married Elizabeth Frances Amherst.

He was a member of the Legislative Council of Lower Canada from 1808 until its dissolution in 1838 in the wake of the Lower Canada Rebellion, and was its deputy speaker on several occasions. He replaced John Caldwell as receiver-general in 1823, until his death in Quebec City.

His brother Edward and his son (also named Edward) served on the Special Council that ushered in the Act of Union.

He wrote Observations on crickets in Canada.

Family

John Hale married Elizabeth Amherst. The daughter of William Amherst and Elizabeth Patterson, she was born Elizabeth Frances Amherst in England and grew up there. They had two children. Edward was a member of the province's legislative council, and Jeffery was a prominent philanthropist.
