= Notre-Dame-des-Anges, Mauricie, Quebec =

Coordinates: 46°52′39″N 72°18′30″W

Notre-Dame-des-Anges (French pronunciation: [nɔtʁə dam dez‿ɑ̃ʒ]) was a former village, and later a former municipality, in the Mauricie region of Quebec. It was located in the territory of what would later be the Mékinac Regional County Municipality.

The village was established in 1919. In 1969, it merged with the municipality of Notre-Dame-des-Anges-de-Montauban to form a municipality which took the name Notre-Dame-des-Anges. Then, in 1976, there was another merger with Montauban (commonly known as Montauban-des-Mines) to form the modern-day municipality of Notre-Dame-de-Montauban.
