= Jeffery Hale =

Canadian philanthropist (1803–1864)

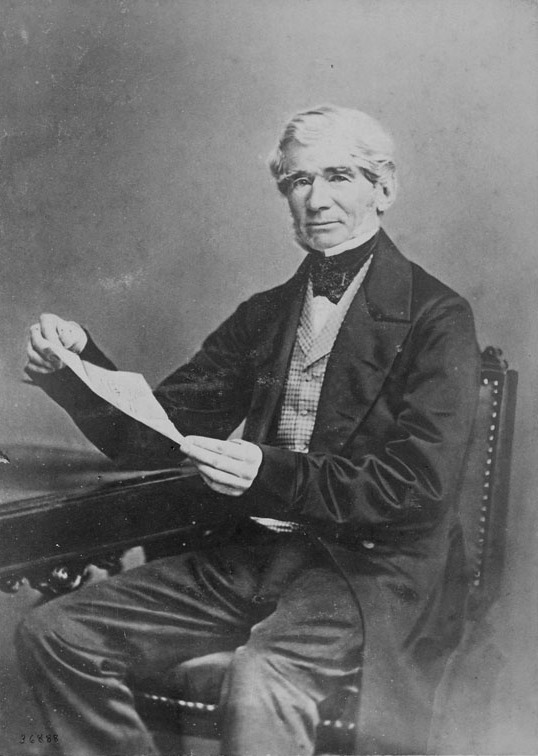
- Hale, taken by William Notman in the 1860s
- Born: April 19, 1803; Quebec City, Quebec, Canada
- Died: November 13, 1864 (aged 61); Tunbridge Wells, Kent, England
- Occupation: Philanthropist
- Known for: Founding roles: Jeffrey Hale Hospital; Mount Hermon Cemetery; 1st Quebec City English Sunday school; Quebec Provident and Savings Bank
- Parents: John Hale (father); Elizabeth Amherst Hale (mother)
- Relatives: Edward Hale (brother); William Pitt Amherst, 1st Earl Amherst, GCH, PC (maternal uncle); Edward Hale (paternal uncle)

Jeffery Hale (April 19, 1803 – November 13, 1864) was a philanthropist in Lower Canada.

== Biography ==
The son of Elizabeth Frances Amherst and John Hale, he was born in Quebec City and was educated in England. Hale served in the Royal Navy from the age of 14 until he was 24, when he returned to Lower Canada to assist his father, who was suffering from poor health, as receiver general for the province. Although Hale temporarily replaced his father, he did not secure the post of receiver general after his father died. He became involved in various charitable organizations and Anglican religious societies. In 1833, he established the first English Sunday school at Quebec City. Hale was a director of the British and Canadian School Society of the District of Quebec and he also provided funds for the establishment and maintenance of other schools. He was a founder of the Quebec Provident and Savings Bank, and also aided in the founding of Mount Hermon Cemetery in Sillery.

Hale died in England at Tunbridge Wells in Kent at the age of 61 and he is buried in Woodbury Park Cemetery. In his will, he provided funds for the establishment of a hospital, the Jeffrey Hale - St Brigid's Hospital.
