= Charles Louis Bernard de Cléron, comte d'Haussonville =

French aristocrat and political figure

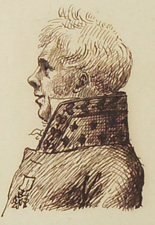

Charles Louis Bernard de Cléron, comte d'Haussonville (1 November 1770– 1 November 1846). was a French aristocrat and political figure, the father of Joseph d'Haussonville.

== Biography ==
He was the son of Joseph-Louis d'Haussonville and Antoinette-Marie de Régnier.

He first fought against the French Revolution in the Armée des Émigrés and the British Army.
He returned to France at the time of the French Consulate.

A chamberlain at the court of Napoleon I, and a count of the French Empire, under the Bourbon Restoration d'Haussonville became a Peer of France and an opponent of the conservative Jean-Baptiste Villèle ministry.
