= Elizabeth Amherst Hale =

Canadian artist (1774–1826)

Elizabeth Frances Amherst Hale
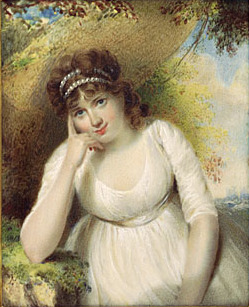
- Born: Elizabeth Frances Amherst; 1774
- Died: June 18, 1826 (aged 51–52); Quebec, Canada
- Spouse: John Hale
- Children: Edward Hale; Jeffery Hale
- Father: William Amherst
- Relatives: William Amherst, 1st Earl Amherst (brother)

Elizabeth Frances Amherst Hale (1774 – 18 June 1826) was a Canadian artist living in Lower Canada (later Quebec). The daughter of William Amherst and Elizabeth Patterson, she was born Elizabeth Frances Amherst in England and grew up there. Hale moved to Canada in 1799 when her husband, John Hale, an officer in the British Army, was posted to Quebec City. She is known for her drawings and paintings of landscapes, particularly a watercolour of the new city of York (now Toronto) in 1804. During the War of 1812 she took her children to England to avoid the conflict, returning after the war ended. After her husband purchased the seigneury of Sainte-Anne-de-la-Pérade, she filled a sketchbook with drawings of the buildings on the property and the surrounding area.

Colin Coates credited her with bringing an "English noble aesthetic" to Quebec. Hale's work is found in the collections of the National Gallery of Canada, the Art Gallery of Ontario, Library and Archives Canada, the Eastern Townships Resource Centre, the Canadian Women Artists History Initiative Documentation Centre and the Musée du Québec.

Her son Edward was a member of the province's legislative council. Her son Jeffery was a prominent philanthropist.

She died at Quebec City in 1826.

Her correspondence with her brother William Amherst, 1st Earl Amherst was published as The Rising Country: the Hale-Amherst Correspondence, 1799-1825 (ISBN 0968931715). Her work is included in the collection of the Musée national des beaux-arts du Québec.
