= Claude Louis François Régnier de Guerchy =

French diplomat (1715–1767)

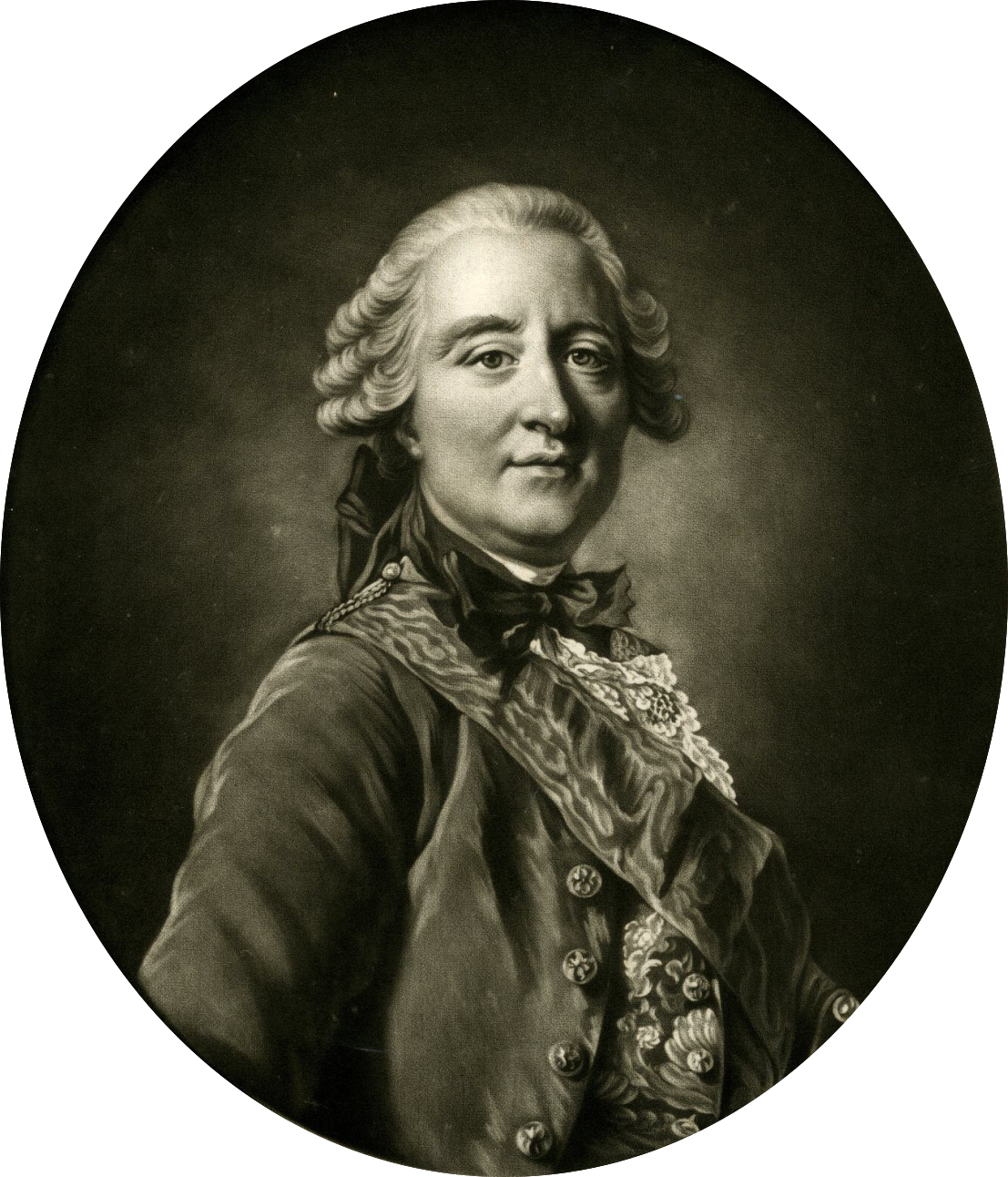
The Marquis of Blosset

Claude-Louis-François Régnier, Count of Guerchy (1715–1767), later Marquis of Blosset, was a French diplomat, Knight of the King's Order and Lieutenant General of his armies.

== Biography ==
Born in an old Burgundy family, he was the eldest son of Louis de Régnier, Marquis of Guerchy, Count of Druy and Jeanne-Louise de Marion de Druy.

In 1742, he inherited the Château de Nangis and title of Marquis de Nangis from his distant cousin Louis Armand de Brichanteau.

=== Military career (1729–1763) ===
Guerchy entered military service in 1729 and gained his first experience in 1730 with the King's Musketeers under his father. He distinguished himself during a series of campaigns: he served in Italy (1733–1734), then on the Rhine (1735), in Bavaria (1741), in Flanders (1741–1747), in the Netherlands (1748), and again in Germany (1757–1760).

During the War of the Austrian Succession, he served at the Sieges of Ypres, Veurne (1744), and Tournai (1745). In the Battle of Fontenoy, he led his regiment in three attacks on the English column.

In June 1745, he was promoted to Maréchal de Camp. That same year, he served in the Siege of Oudenaarde, in 1746 in the capture of Brussels, and in the sieges of Charleroi, Mons, and Namur. Also in 1745, he served in the Battle of Rocoux, and in 1747 in the Battle of Lauffeldt, where he was wounded.

In 1748, he became Governor of Huningue in Alsace and participated in the Siege of Maastricht. He delivered news of its capture to the King. Later that same year, he was appointed Lieutenant General of the King's Armies.

During the Seven Years' War, he served in Germany. He participated in the battles of Hastenbeck (1757), Krefeld (1758), and Minden (1759).

=== Ambassador to London (1763–1767) ===
Guerchy succeeded Louis Jules Mancini, Duke of Nevers as ambassador to London in 1763. He was faced with numerous unresolved issues following seven years of war, such as the return of the prisoners of war, the fortifications of Dunkirk, and the disputes over fishing off Newfoundland and the Falkland Islands.

Leboucher and Bontemps, his two secretaries, assisted the ambassador and performed the bulk of the work. He was also assisted by Charles de Beaumont, Chevalier d'Éon, who had been interim ambassador and who was meant to guide him through the complexities of his highly delicate post. But the Chevalier d'Éon was a spy for King Louis XV, who received secret instructions directly from the King. Because Guerchy only learned of these instructions indirectly, conflicts arose with the Chevalier d'Éon. This led to heated, sometimes written, disputes, for which the ambassador enlisted the help of two literary figures, Ange Goudar and Treyssac de Vergy.

Although Guerchy won a court case, he found himself in such dire straits that on 17 May 1764, he sent a memorandum to Lord Halifax, demanding the protection of national and international law, but to no avail. After these legal defeats in London, the ambassador felt he was no longer able to adequately represent his country.

His departure from London resembled more of an escape, during which he, for safety's sake, presented himself as his own secretary. He had been recalled by the king at his own request, especially since he was suffering from health problems. On 20 July 1767, he left his post.

While still in Paris, he was blackmailed by means of a malicious satire entitled La Guerchiade, but Guerchy died in the capital on 17 September 1767. Thus, the work was never printed.

=== Marriage and children ===
In 1740 he was married to Gabrielle-Lidie de Harcourt, daughter of François d'Harcourt, Marquis de la Mailleraye, Captain of the Corps Guards of His Majesty, Governor of Sedan.
They had 6 children, 2 of whom reached adulthood :

- Antoinette Marie (1748-1837), married with Joseph Louis Bernard de Cléron d'Haussonville (1737-1806). Had issue.
- Anne Louis (1755-1806), marquis de Guerchy, marquis de Nangis. Had issue.

== See also ==
- List of Ambassadors of France to the United Kingdom
