= Château de Nangis =

Castle in Seine-et-Marne, France

Coordinates: 48°33′16″N 3°0′49″E

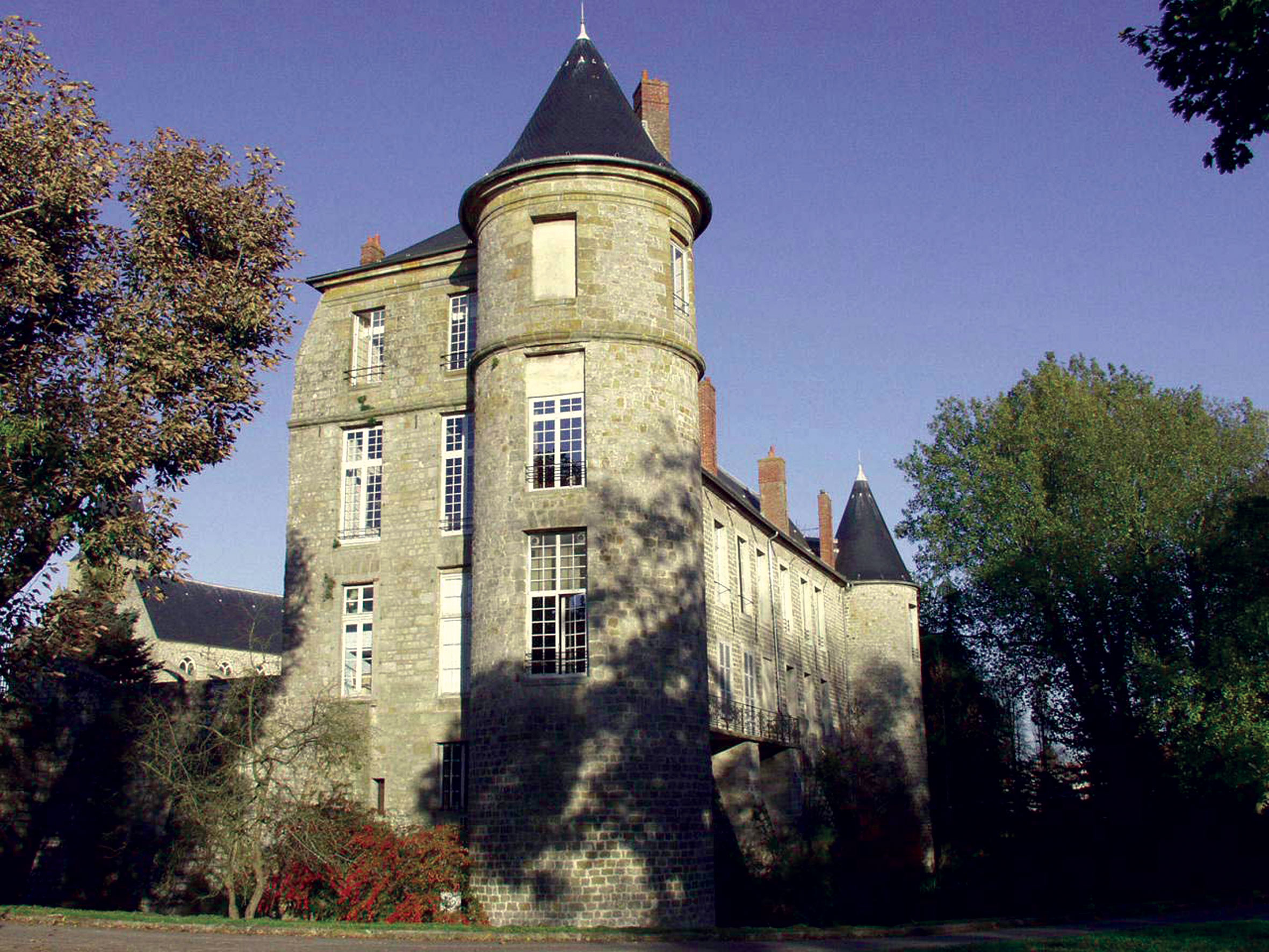
View from the back

The Motte-Beauvoir or Beauvais Castle is a modernised castle located in the heart of the town of Nangis, in the Seine-et-Marne département of France. It protected the population of the "seigneurie" (lord's domain) during the Hundred Years' War. Today, it houses the town hall.

== History ==
The name "La Motte" suggests the motte-and-bailey that indicates the middle-age origin of the place. Fleury (c. 1093-† c. 1147), son of the king Philip I of France, is its oldest known lord ("seigneur"). In 1245, the castle came into the ownership of the Montmorency family. A well known fortress in 1397, the English inflicted important damage to the castle in 1429. The king Charles VII the Well-Served gave the domain to Denis de Chailly from Chailly-en-Bière as a reward for his help to Jeanne d'Arc. He rebuilt the fortress in 1436.

By marrying Marie de Vères in 1507, Louis de Brichanteau became the new lord; his descendants kept the domain until the French Revolution. Around 1590, Antoine de Brichanteau modernised the residential building. The domain became a marquisate in 1612. The castle was visited by Louis XIV in 1678. When Armand de Brichanteau died in 1742, a distant cousin, the count of Guerchy, became the new marquis. His son, Anne-Louis of Guerchy, the last marquis of Nangis, almost ruined, sold the castle to a Paris notary in 1795, who destroyed two of the three buildings, keeping only the left wing.

The castle was purchased by the city in 1859 and became the town hall. Viewed from the outside, the left wing has not changed much since then. Six paintings in the marriage room are portraits that were classified as historical monuments despite the fact that the building itself is not.

== Description ==
Today, one can still see the moats of the old motte that were then filled with water. In those days, Jeanne d'Arc had crossed the drawbridge to reach the keep. The left wing that remains today has two corner towers. One can also see a cylindrical outer wall tower including loopholes. The "Mémoire" picture base of the Ministère de la Culture comprises two photos taken around 1907-1909, one showing the front view and the other, an outer wall tower.

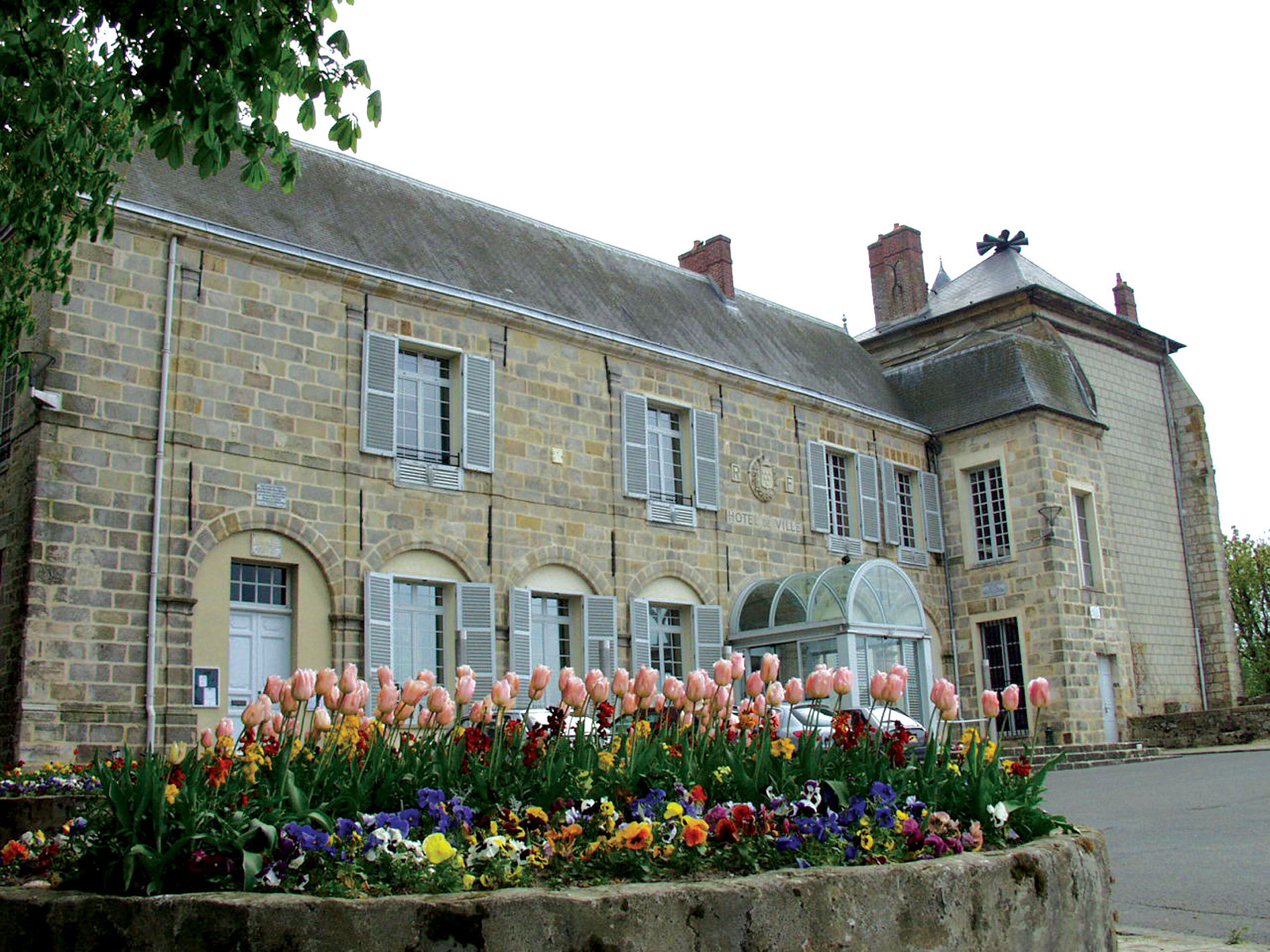
Front view - Hôtel de ville

== See also ==
List of castles in France
