= Notre-Dame-de-Montauban =

- Municipality
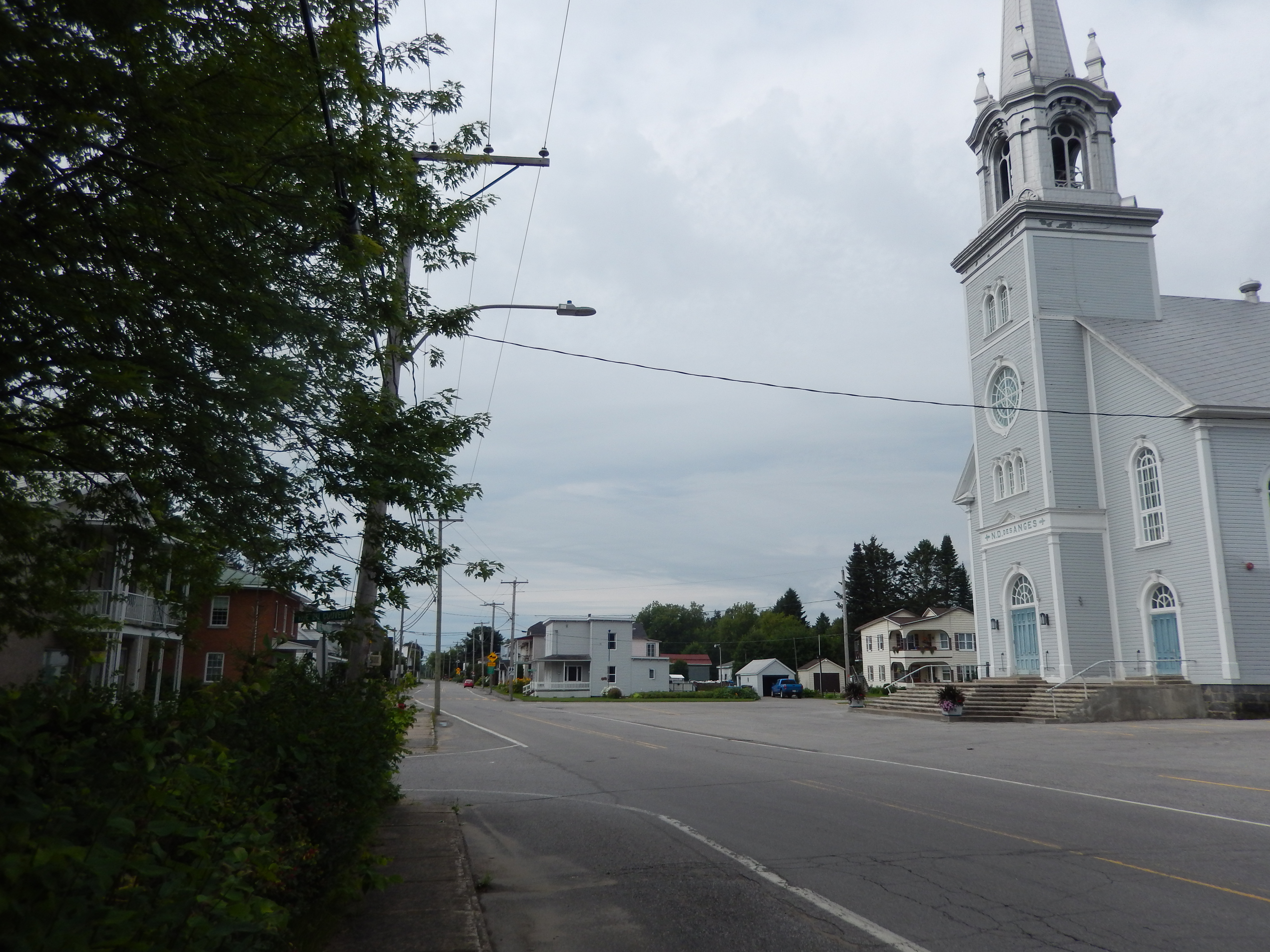

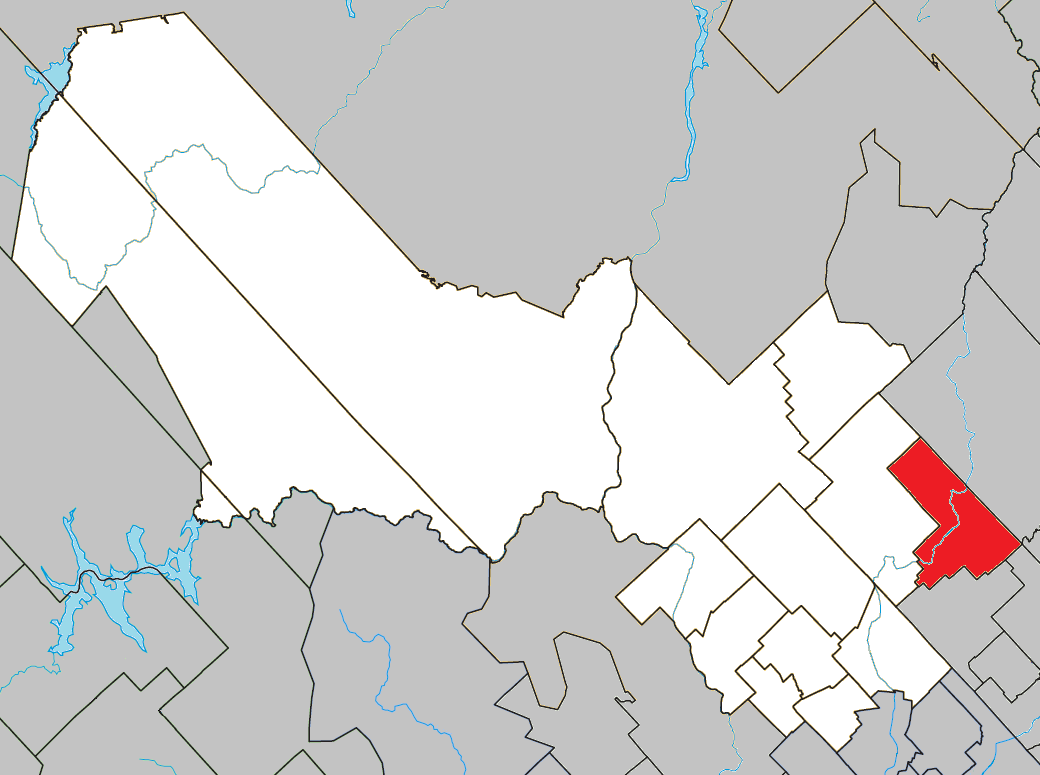
- Location within Mékinac RCM

- Location in central Quebec
- Coordinates: 46°52′N 72°20′W
- Country: Canada
- Province: Quebec
- Region: Mauricie
- RCM: Mékinac
- Settled: 1870
- Constituted: January 3, 1976

Government
  - Mayor: Marcel Picard
  - Fed. riding: Saint-Maurice—Champlain
  - Prov. riding: Laviolette

Area
  - Total: 173.08 km^{2} (66.83 sq mi)
  - Land: 162.40 km^{2} (62.70 sq mi)

Population (2021)
  - Total: 815
  - Density: 5/km^{2} (13/sq mi)
  - Change 2016-21: ▲9.4%
  - Dwellings: 731
- Time zone: UTC−5 (EST)
  - Summer (DST): UTC−4 (EDT)
- Postal code(s): G0X 1W0
- Area codes: 418, 581
- Highways: R-367
- Website: www.municipalite.notre-dame-de-montauban.qc.ca

Notre-Dame-de-Montauban (French pronunciation: [nɔtʁə dam də mɔ̃tobɑ̃]) is a municipality in the Mauricie region in Quebec, Canada. The municipality is on the northern edge of Mékinac Regional County Municipality and the administrative region of Mauricie and includes the population centres of Notre-Dame-des-Anges and Montauban-les-Mines. Both communities are located along route 367 and are about 7 kilometres (4.3 mi) apart.

Tourist activities and the resort are significant industries today. The marked trails for recreational vehicles (snowmobile, ATV, etc.), the hunting, fishing and forest walks attract many visitors. Nine out of the fall of the Batiscan River is the major tourist attraction. On the west bank, the municipality has built a beautiful park with a gateway to reach a large rock in the middle of the fall.

At Notre-Dame-de-Montauban, the population is approximately 850, with a median age of 45 years. The most significant age group is 25-44. In summer season, the population doubles because of country cottages. The town has two Catholic places of worship, the church of Notre-Dame-des-Anges (Our Lady of the Angels) and the chapel of Montauban.

== Geography ==
The municipality covers 163.53 square kilometres (63.14 sq mi) and has 53 lakes. Batiscan River, flowing from north to south, divides the city in two. The village of Notre-Dame-des-Anges is located on the east side of the river, downstream from the breathtaking falls. The village of Montauban-les-Mines is located in the east, near the limit of Saint-Ubalde. The village of Notre-Dame-de-Montauban is part of the Batiscanie, Quebec, being in the watershed Batiscan River. However, an area at the southeast of the municipal territory, at the limit of Saint-Ubalde, Quebec, is rather dependent on the watershed Sainte-Anne River.

== History timeline ==
- 1870: Founding of the Notre-Dame-de-la-Batiscan Parish, renamed to Notre-Dame-des-Anges-de-la-Rivière-Batiscan Parish around 1877, and then to Notre-Dame-des-Anges-de-Montauban in 1879.
- 1882: Creation of the Municipality of Notre-Dame-des-Anges-de-Montauban from the unorganized Portneuf County territories.
- 1919: The Village Municipality of Notre-Dame-des-Anges is created out of Notre-Dame-des-Anges-de-Montauban.
- 1919: The Village Municipality of Montauban is created out of areas ceded by Saint-Ubalde, Notre-Dame-des-Anges-de-Montauban, and Saint-Rémi.
- 1969: Fusion between the Village Municipality of Notre-Dame-des-Anges and the Municipality of Notre-Dame-des-Anges-de-Montauban to form the Municipality of Notre-Dame-des-Anges.
- January 3, 1976: Fusion between the Municipality of Notre-Dame-des-Anges and the Village of Montauban to form the Municipality of Notre-Dame-de-Montauban.

=== Religious chronology ===
- January 1, 2018 - Creation of the new "fabrique" of the parish of Saint-Coeur-de-Marie, merging the factories of Notre-Dame-des-Anges, Saint-Éloi-les-Mines, Saint- Rémi-du-Lac-aux-Sables, St. Leopold of Hervey-Junction, St. Thecla and St. Adelphe.
- June 10, 2018 - Inauguration of the new factory in the presence of the Bishop of the Diocese of Trois-Rivières Mgr. Luc Bouchard.

== Demographics ==
Historical census populations – Notre-Dame-de-Montauban

Year	Pop.	±%
1976	903	—
1981	893	−1.1%
1986	948	+6.2%
1991	895	−5.6%
1996	909	+1.6%

Year	Pop.	±%
2001	817	−10.1%
2006	846	+3.5%
2011	747	−11.7%
2016	745	−0.3%
2021	815	+9.4%

Source: Statistics Canada

Private dwellings occupied by usual residents (2021): 443 (total dwellings: 731)

Mother language (2021):

- French as first language: 98.8%
- English as first language: 0.0%
- English and French as first languages: 0.6%
- Other as first language: 0.6%

== Economy ==
The railway from Hervey-Jonction to Chambord (Lac Saint-Jean) has contributed greatly to the economic growth of the Notre-Dame-des-Anges sector. The railway station was built on the west side of the Batiscan River.

Historically, the local economy was mainly based on agriculture and forestry. The agricultural zone occupies about 8% of the municipal territory in the area; nearly 44% is cultivated and 51% is in oak. Some pastures are also intended for breeding cattle. While the Montauban-les-Mines area experienced an economic boom in the mining industry, since the beginning of the 20th century.

In the history of Notre-Dame-de-Montauban, 34 sawmills have been identified. "Scierie Montauban" (Montauban sawmill) is be the major business in the area and the only sawmill to survive. Other local SMEs operating specialize in construction, mechanical equipment and cabinetry.

== See also ==
- Charest River
- Lake Charest
- Portneuf Wildlife Reserve
