= Battle of Signal Hill =

1762 battle in Newfoundland

- Part of Seven Years' War
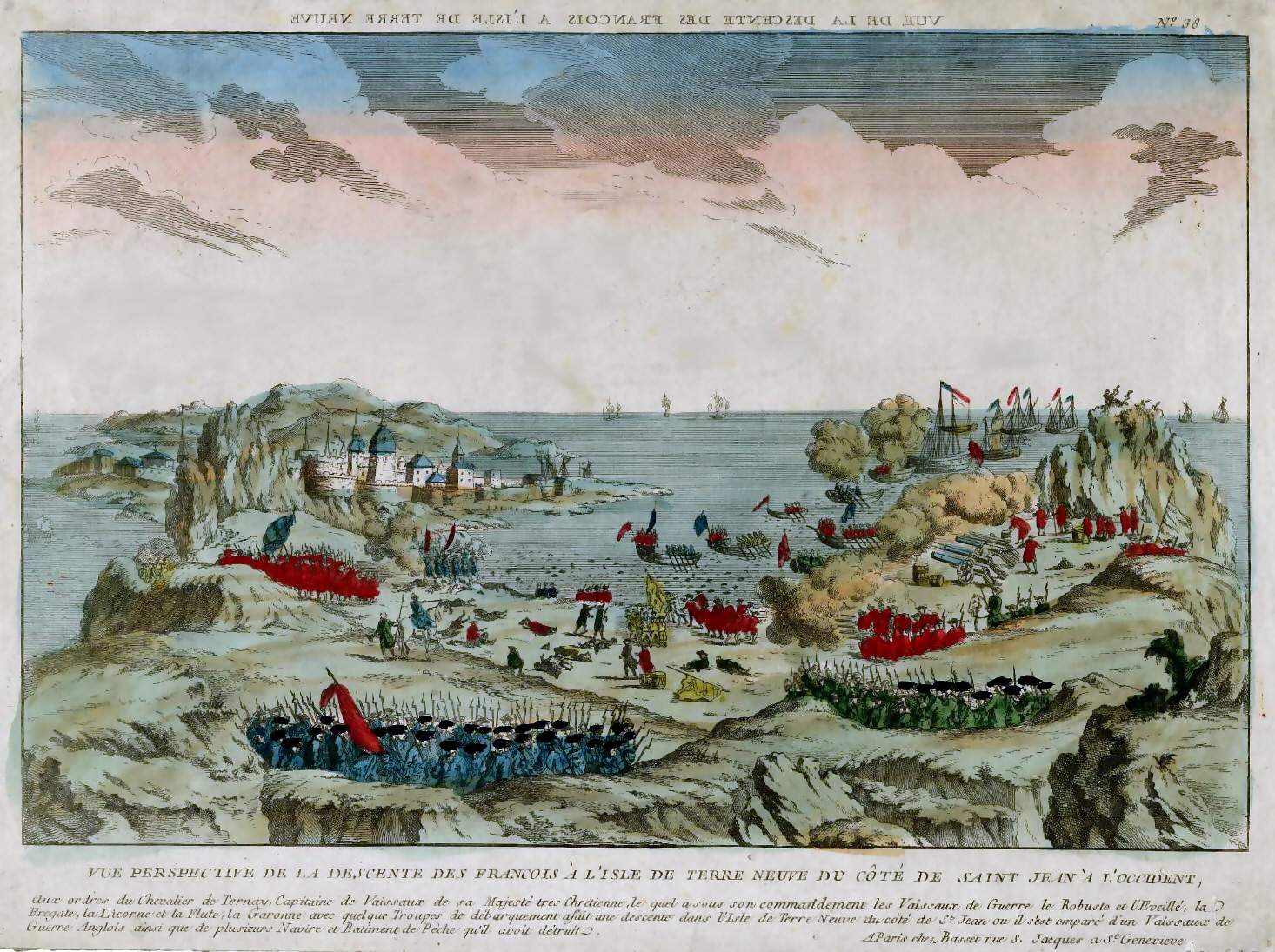
- French illustration of the battle
Date	15 September 1762
Location	St. John's, Newfoundland 47°34′11″N 52°40′55″W
Result	British victory

Belligerents
Great Britain	France

Commanders and leaders
William Amherst	Guillaume de Bellecombe

Strength
1,559	800

Casualties and losses
4–5 killed 19 wounded	20–40 killed 700 captured

The Battle of Signal Hill, fought on 15 September 1762, was the last battle of the Seven Years' War. A British force under Lieutenant-colonel William Amherst recaptured St. John's, which the French had seized earlier that year in a surprise attack described in some accounts as an ambush.

== Background ==
By 1762 France and Britain had been fighting for seven years, and both were contemplating a peace agreement. Britain's long blockade of the French coast had forced the French economy into a decline. It also had prevented the French navy from going to the aid of France's colonies around the globe, and many had been taken over by Britain. To rebuild the French navy during the years of peace, the French believed that they needed access to the Newfoundland fishery and planned an expedition to take the island in anticipation of the coming peace negotiations. In May 1762 a small force under the Chevalier de Ternay slipped out of Brest and past the blockade and headed west into the Atlantic.

=== French occupation ===
On June 27, 1762, the French under Comte d'Haussonville [fr] forced the British capitulation of St. John's. During the following weeks, d'Haussonville, under the orders of the Chevalier de Ternay, consolidated the French position in Newfoundland. His defence system consisted of several advance posts equipped with artillery around Signal Hill, a strategic point dominating the surrounding area.

On September 13, 1762, the British landed at Torbay, a few miles to the north. Ternay and Haussonville were unable to counter this action. To hamper the British advance, they dispatched a detachment to guard the bare summit of Signal Hill.

=== Regional importance ===
St. John's, being the most easterly city in the Americas, excluding those of Greenland, was an important place for docking ships from Europe and preparing them for further inland river journeys. As part of the continuing competition between the French and British in North America, the French took over this valuable territory. In rapid succession, the British fought back and regained the city.

Apart from its seaboard advantages, St. John's was highly regarded for its abundance of natural resources. St. John's had a huge fishing industry; by 1540, Spanish and Portuguese ships were traveling to the point solely to gather fish. The land is also abundant in fir and spruce trees, which were commonly used in building ships and often as sources of food/medicine.

Signal Hill was used throughout the 18th century as a centre for the defence of St. John’s. Along the Atlantic coast and northeast of the Avalon Peninsula (southeastern Newfoundland), Signal Hill is located next to the inlet of the harbour of St. John's. Since sea was the only effective mode of transportation during the battle, troops on Signal Hill could spot seaboard vehicles from far off. Additionally, Signal Hill had to be passed to enter the settlement of St. John’s from the sea. Defenders could attack foreign warships and prevent their destruction of the settlement.

== Battle ==
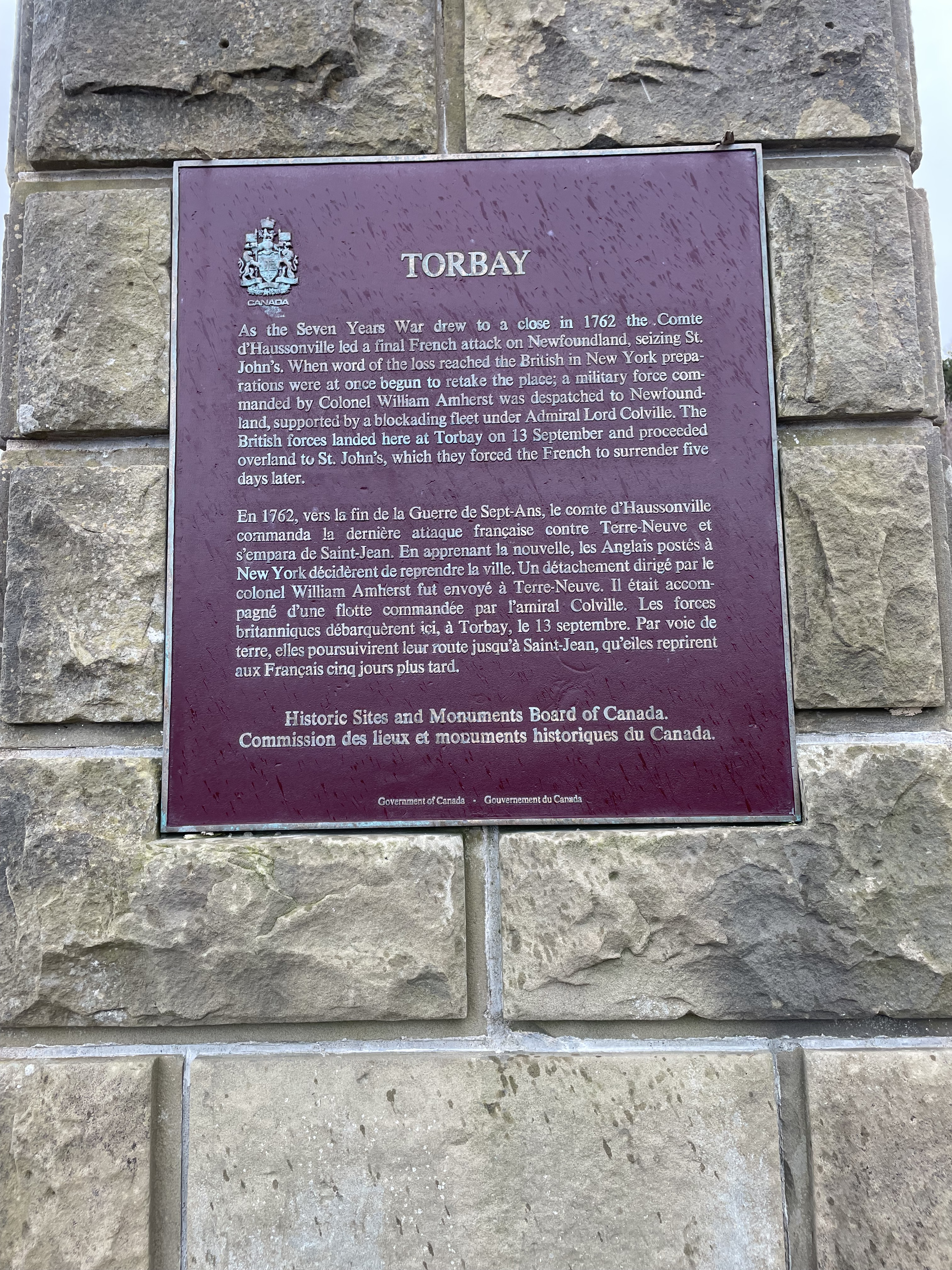
Plaque in Torbay which commemorates the landing of Amherst on 13 September

On 26 August, British warships dispatched by Amherst and under Captain Campbell had reached the now-British Halifax Harbour and hoped to recapture St. John's. Returning to sea on 1 September, three days after the expected date because of contrary winds, those particular men-of-war had reached Louisbourg on 5 September. After leaving on the 7th, Campbell's fleet joined that of Lord Colvill's on the 11th, not far from the southern coast of St. John's. Nearing the 12th, the fleets landed at Torbay, a few miles north of St. John's, and took three prisoners. The French commanders, Count D'Haussonville and Bellecombe, were unable to prevent the British landing at Torbay and so they sent a battalion to guard Signal Hill as an important protection summit for its natural defences. At the break of September 15, British troops climbed the hill held by the French. The surprise was total, and the engagement was brief but fatal. The commander of the French detachment, Guillaume de Bellecombe, was seriously wounded. On the British side, a bullet shattered the legs of one of Amherst's officers, MacDonell. The British attacked about 295 French infantry, which resulted with the remainder of the French (about 600) retreating to Fort William.

== Aftermath ==
At the close of the battle, the British controlled Signal Hill. Strengthened by this gain, the British had numerous artillery pieces delivered to their position from Torbay and began to construct batteries to bombard the fort. Three days later, the French garrison of St. John's surrendered, which consisted of just over 700 French regulars. This was the last major battle of the war in North America.

== Sources ==
- Dull, Jonathan R. (2005). The French Navy and the Seven Years' War. University of Nebraska Press.
- Fowler, Jr., William (2005). Empires at War. New York: Walker & Company. ISBN 0-8027-1411-0.
