= Edward Hale (seigneur) =

Edward Hale (fl. 1812 – October 15, 1862) was a member of the Special Council of Lower Canada that was formed in the aftermath of the Lower Canada Rebellion.

He was the seigneur of Portneuf, a seigneurie located around the present-day town of Portneuf, Quebec. He was an officer in the militia who reached the rank of Major in 1830.

He was appointed to the Special Council on August 1, 1839 and was a member until it was dissolved on February 10, 1841, when the Act of Union went into effect.

He was the brother of John Hale, who was a longtime member of the Legislative Council of Lower Canada, and the uncle of his namesake Edward Hale who was also appointed to the Special Council, on September 19, 1839.
