= Jeffrey Hale - St Brigid's Hospital =

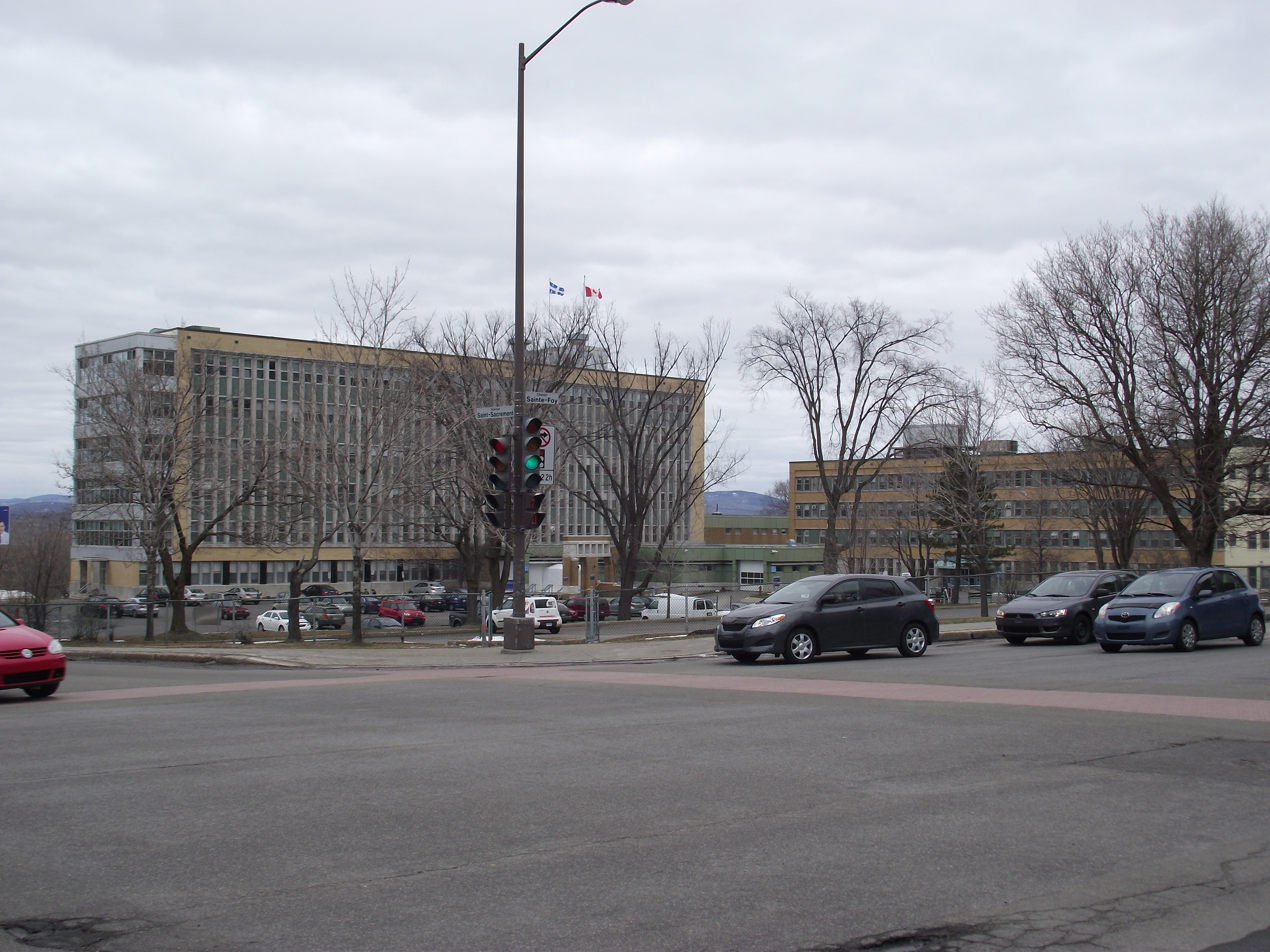
- Jeffery Hale Hospital

Geography
- Location: Quebec City, Quebec, Canada
- Coordinates: 46.7967°N 71.2531°W

History
- Opened: 1856 (St. Brigid's Home)

Links
- Website: www.jhsb.ca
- Lists: Hospitals in Canada

Jeffery Hale - Saint Brigid's is a publicly funded health establishment located in Quebec City, Quebec, Canada. It provides a range of primary health care services to the population of Quebec's Capitale-Nationale (Greater Quebec City) region.

== History ==
In 1856, Reverend Father Bernard McGauran founded Saint Brigid's Home as a shelter for Irish immigrants, widows and orphans. In 1864, philanthropist Jeffery Hale left a sum of money in his will to found a hospital to care for Protestants of all denominations.

== Merger ==
In 2007, these two health establishments merged. Jeffery Hale - Saint Brigid's is legally mandated as a residential and long-term care centre (CHSLD - Centre d'hébergement de soins de longue durée) with complementary missions for hospital centre services and community (CLSC-type) services in English. Jeffery Hale - Saint Brigid's also has the mandate to serve the region's English-speaking population.

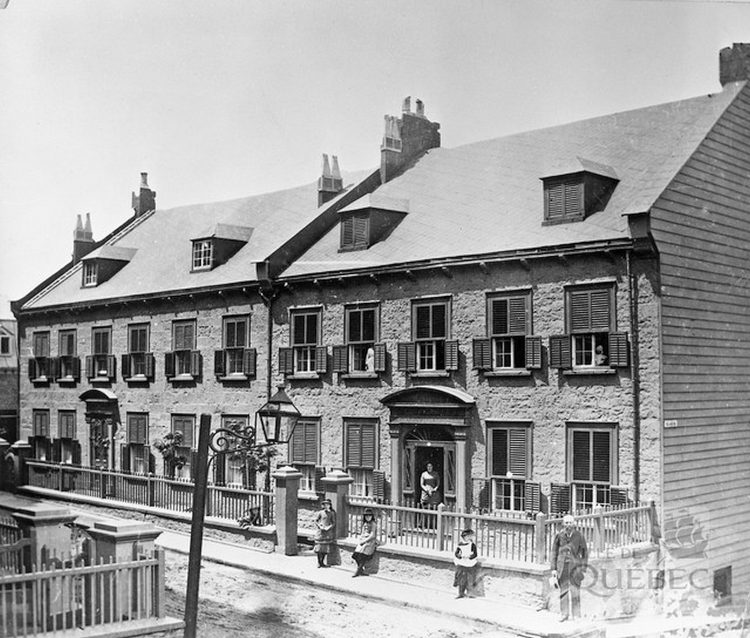
First Jeffery Hale

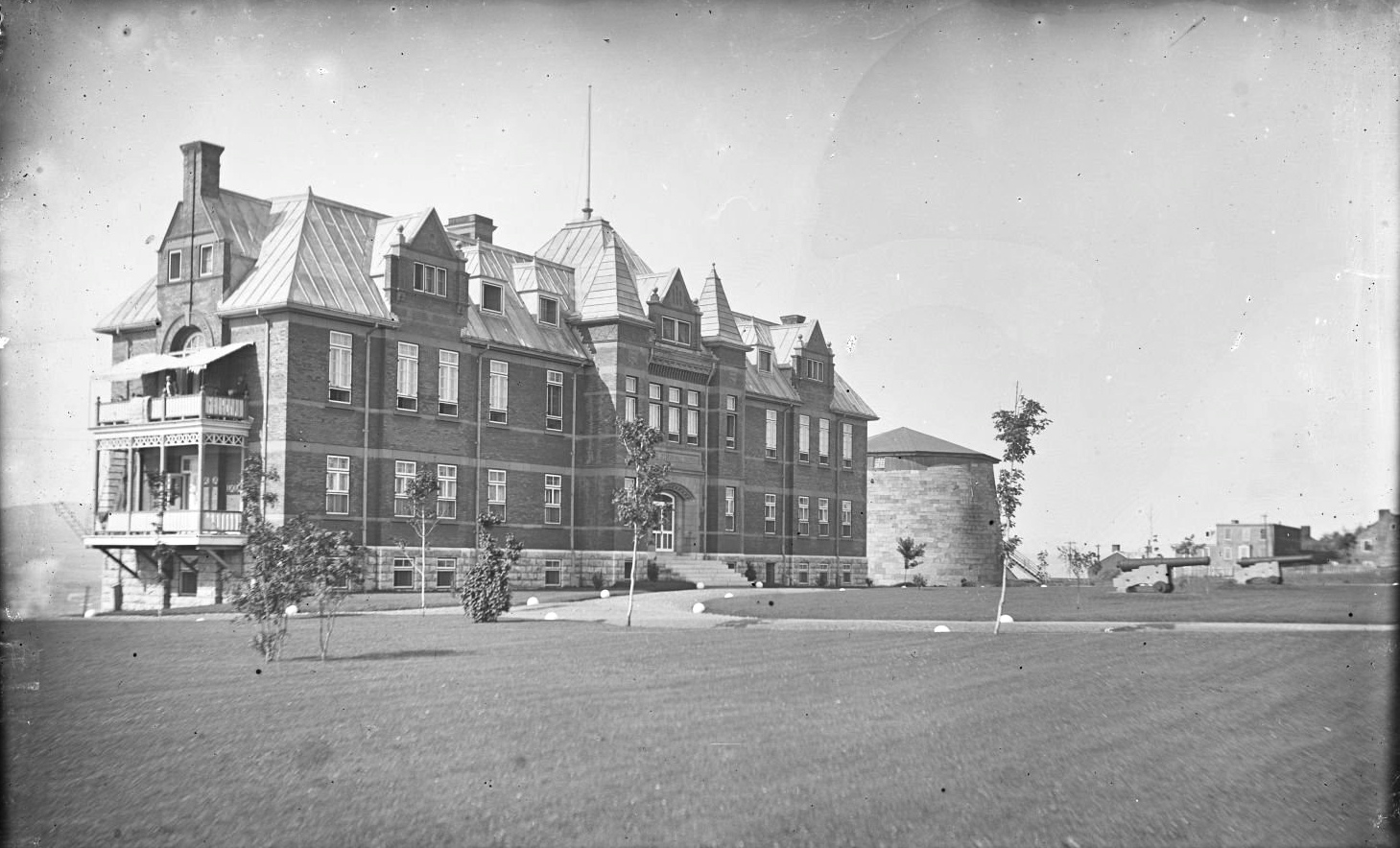
Jeffery Hale in 1904

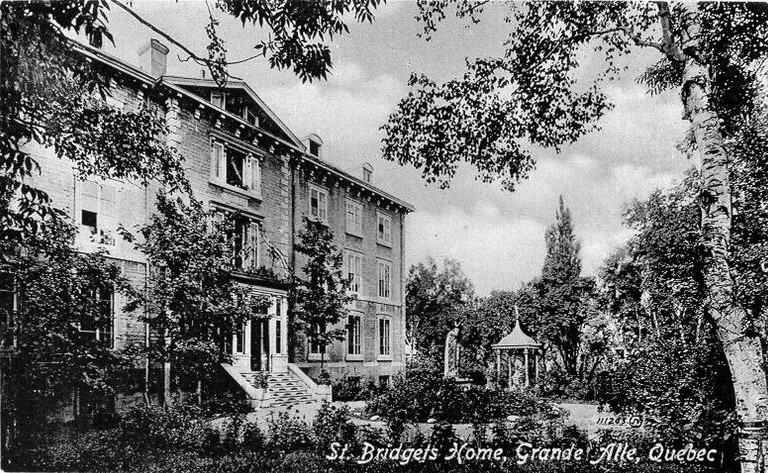
St. Brigid's, Grande Allée, 1930
