= Charest River =

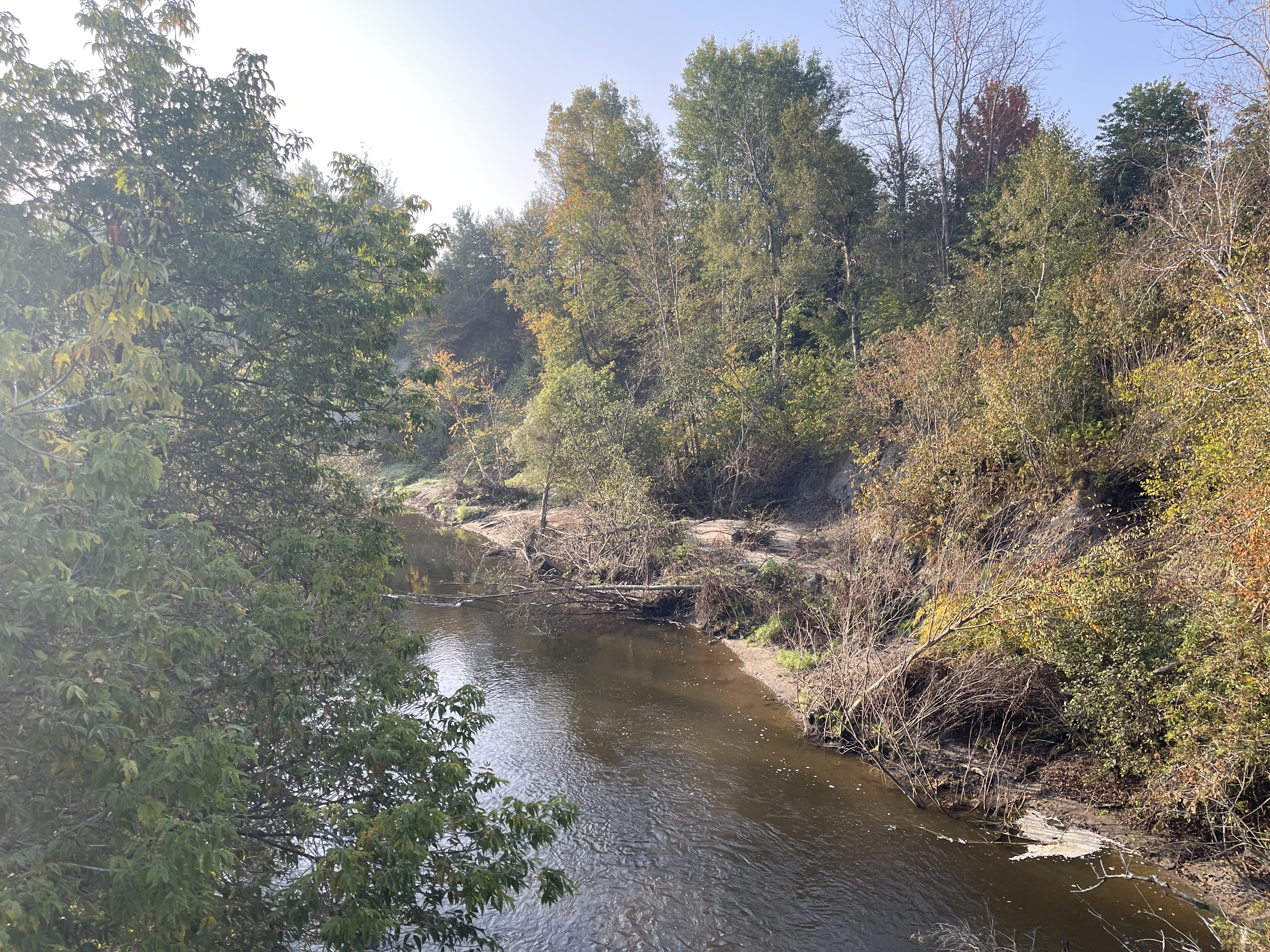
- Downstream, in forest areas, Saint-Prosper-de-Champlain

Location
- Country: Canada
- Province: Quebec
- Region: Mauricie
- Regional County Municipality: Mekinac Regional County Municipality and Les Chenaux Regional County Municipality
- Municipalities: Notre-Dame-de-Montauban, Saint-Ubalde, Lac-aux-Sables, Saint-Prosper-de-Champlain and Sainte-Anne-de-la-Pérade.

Physical characteristics
- Source: Charest Lake
  - location: Notre-Dame-de-Montauban
  - coordinates: 46.83111°N 72.32528°W
  - elevation: 156 m (512 ft)
- Mouth: Sainte-Anne River
  - location: Saint-Anne-de-la-Pérade
  - coordinates
  - elevation: 10 m (33 ft)
- Length: 46 km (29 mi)
- Discharge
  - location: Sainte-Anne-de-la-Pérade

Basin features
- Tributaries
  - left: (Upward from the mouth) Ruisseau Caiphe, ruisseau Hébert, décharge d'un lac non identifié, décharge d'un lac non identifié.
  - right: (Upward from the mouth) Ruisseau Gendron, ruisseau Cloutier, décharge d'un lac non identifié, décharge du lac Leduc, ruisseau du Rang Price, ruisseau Ayotte.

The Charest River originates from Charest Lake in the Montauban-les-Mines area, located in the eastern part of Notre-Dame-de-Montauban, within the Mekinac Regional County Municipality, in the administrative region of Mauricie in the province of Quebec, Canada. It flows southward, passing through several regions and receiving water from lakes such as Mine, Perron, Perreault, and End in its upper course.

The river serves agricultural and recreational tourism activities predominantly, with forestry also playing a significant role in the local economy. During winter, except for rapid zones, the Charest River generally freezes from early December to late March, with safe ice circulation occurring from late December to early March.

== Geography ==
The Charest River flows south, crossing the rows St. Paul, St. Achilles and Sainte-Anne, in Saint-Ubalde and gradually goes away from the boundaries of the Lac-aux-Sables. In his course, going toward the boundary Saint-Ubalde and Saint-Adelphe, receiving water from lakes Sainte-Anne and Perch, and then meanders southeastward, nearly parallel to the Batiscan River) and through 16 lots in the First Price Row in the Eastern section of Saint-Adelphe, where its course becomes very coil.

After descending the moraine more than a kilometer in the northeast row in the municipality of Sainte-Anne-de-la-Pérade, Charest River forks to 90 degrees to the right (southbound) entering Saint-Prosper-de-Champlain, moving towards the village, along the foot of the moraine. Then the river forks again 90 degrees to the left and passes through the agricultural zone lowlands of Saint-Prosper-de-Champlain, and goes to flow into the delta of the Sainte-Anne River near "Ile Rivard" (Rivard island), in the municipality of Sainte-Anne-de-la-Pérade. In its course of 35 kilometres (22 mi) Charest River drains a lot of farmland and forest areas especially in his journey through the moraine.

In 1950, a landslide on the banks of the Charest River in Saint-Prosper-de-Champlain left a mark on an area of 300 by 525 metres (984 by 1,722 ft). This shift has been diverting the course of the channel in a loop and altered the hydrological dynamics.

== Gendron Creek ==
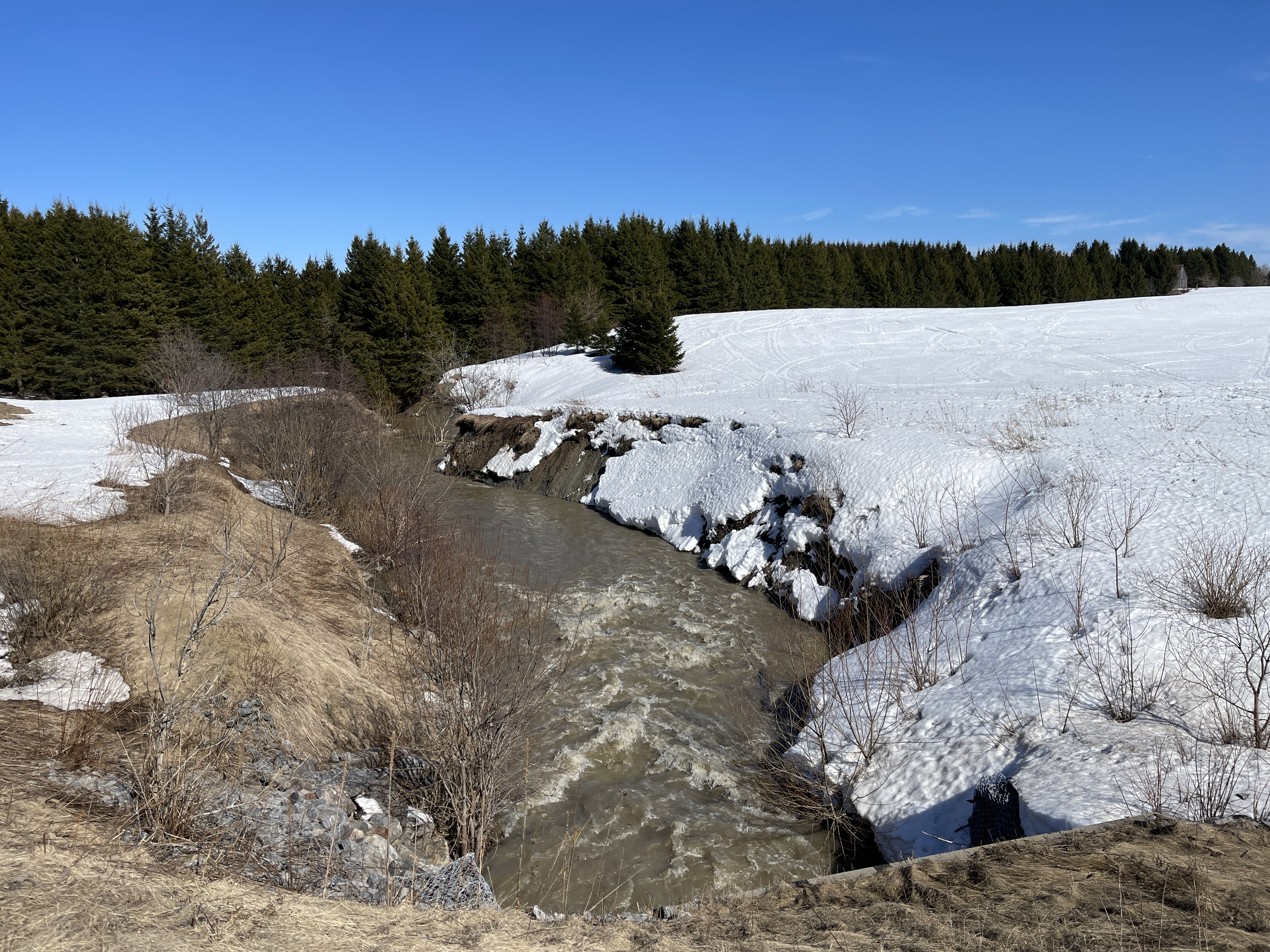
Gendron creek, Charest River's tributary

From its source to the row Price in Saint-Adelphe (far eastern territory of Saint-Adelphe), Gendron stream follows a parallel course to the rivers Charest and Batiscan. After crossing straight rough and not conducive to agricultural land, Gendron creek descends the great moraine in a long crevice. His journey becomes very meander in the St. Lawrence plain through the village of Saint-Prosper-de-Champlain (northeast side), in Chemin des Trente-Trois (First row St. Edward) and row St. Elizabeth. Gendron stream reform constantly meandering channel and on the loamy bottom Lowlands St. Lawrence plain.

Gendron Creek flows into the Charest River, close to the mouth of the latter. In Saint-Prosper-de-Champlain, Edouard Creek is the main tributary of Gendron stream. The flow of Gendron stream is accentuated when the snow melts in the spring, it can also be temporarily after heavy rains. (Localisation of the mouth of the Gendron creek: 46 ⁰ 36 ' 13.07 North, -072 ⁰ 15' 29.24 West).

== Toponymy ==
The name Charest River was entered in the register of place names of the Commission de toponymie du Québec (Geographical Names Board of Québec) on December 5, 1968.

== Photos ==
Charest River

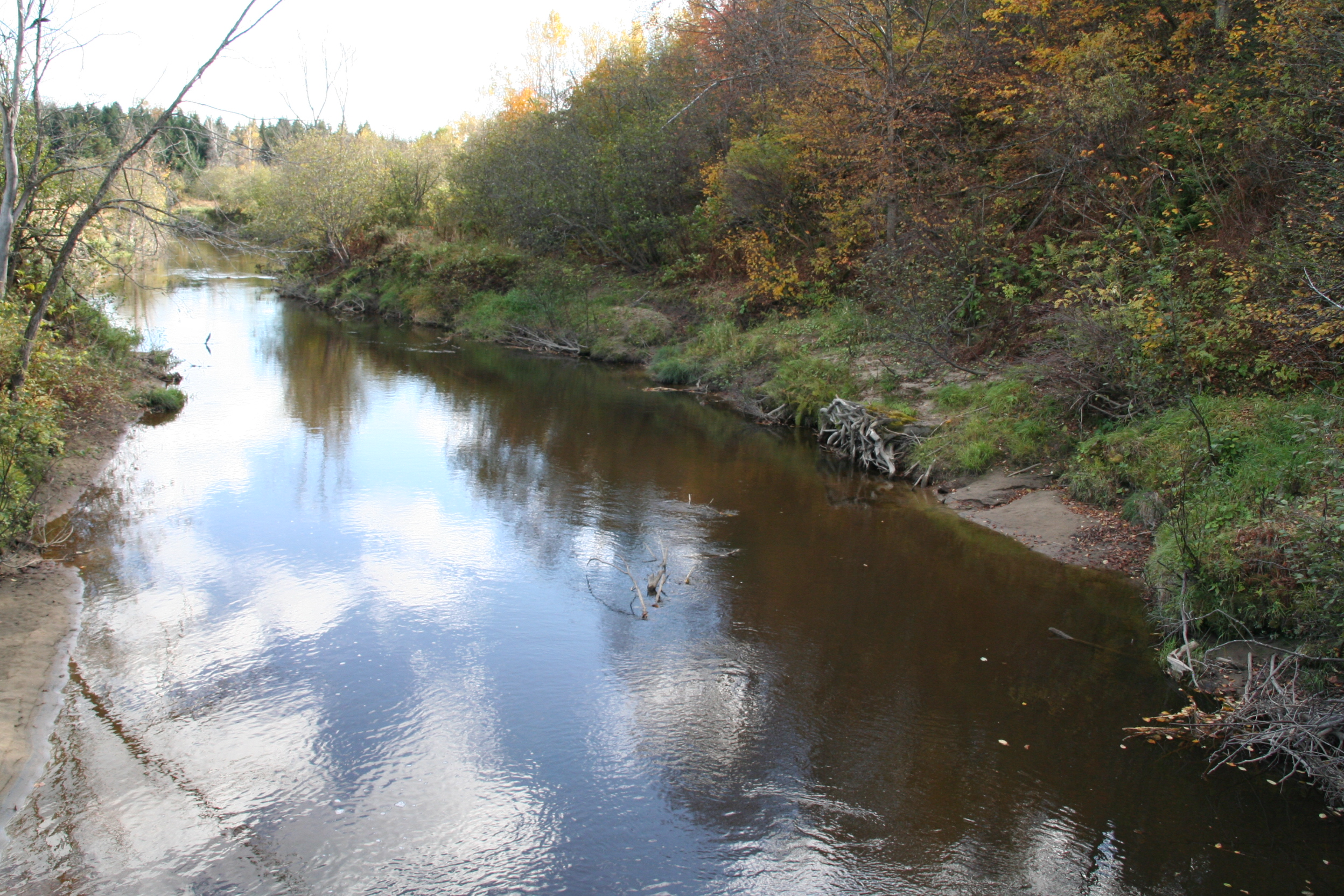
Rang Saint-Charles, from Bridge P-01558, Sainte-Anne-de-la-Pérade

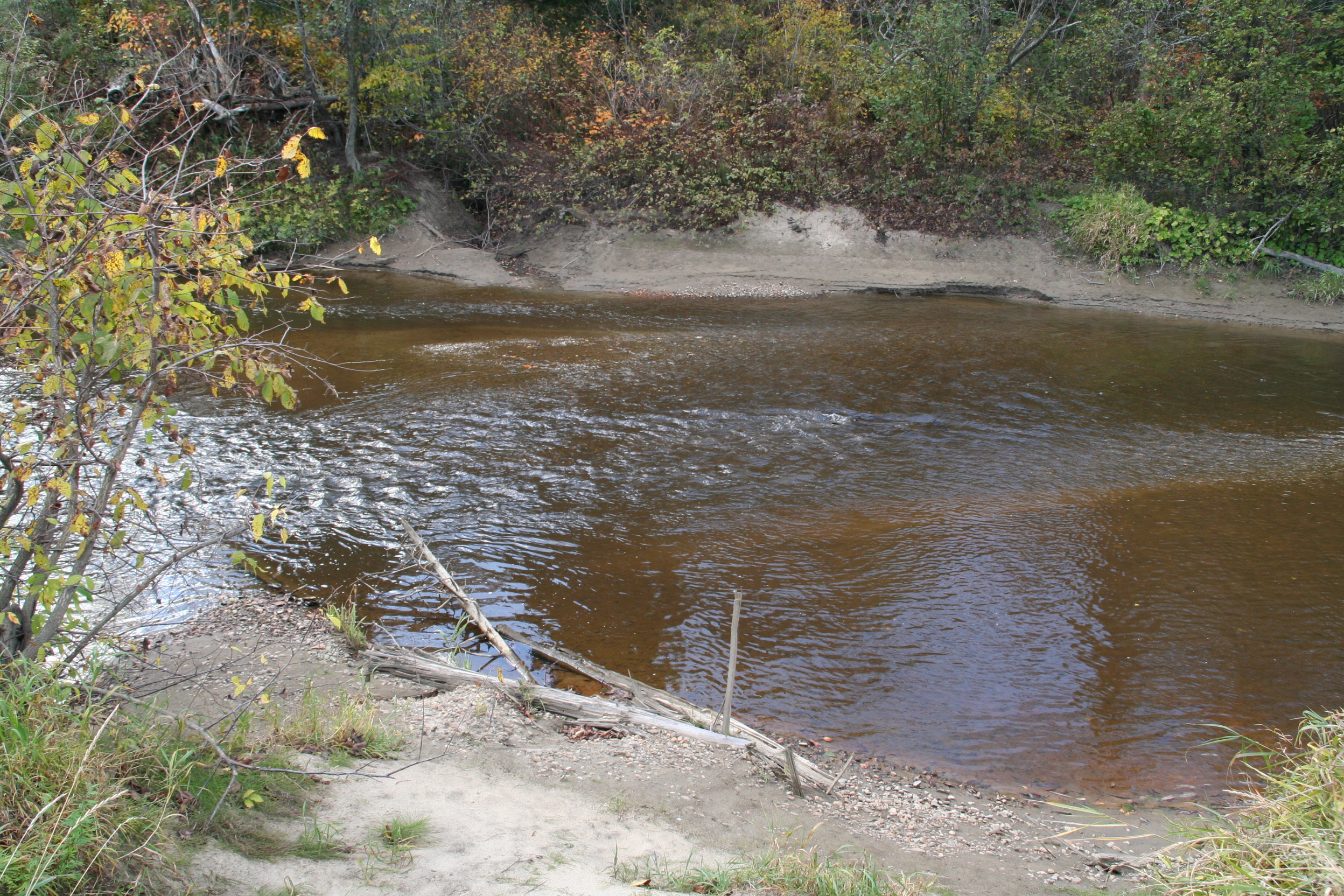
Rang Saint-Charles, from Bridge P-01558, Sainte-Anne-de-la-Pérade

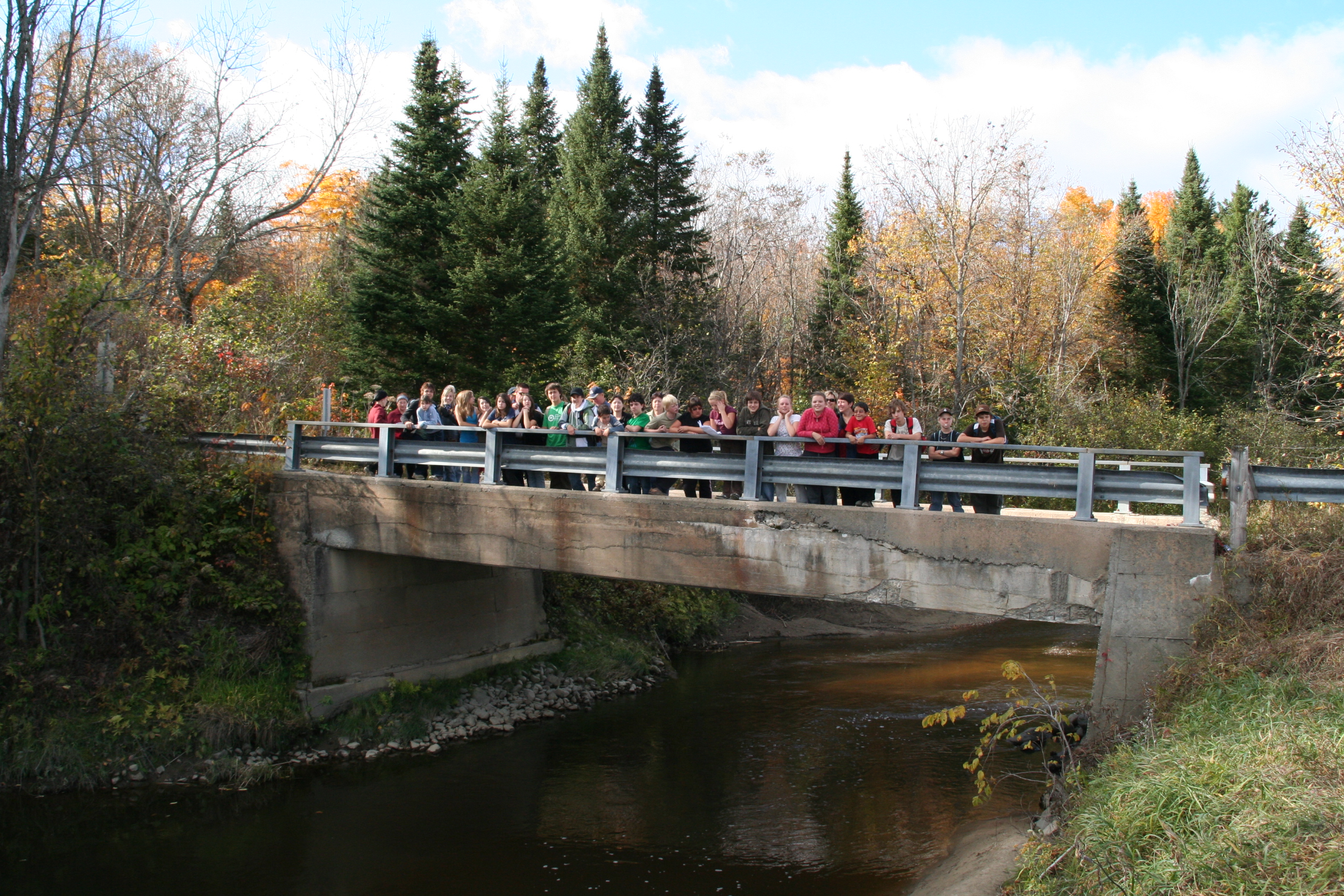
Rang Saint-Charles, Bridge P-01558, Sainte-Anne-de-la-Pérade

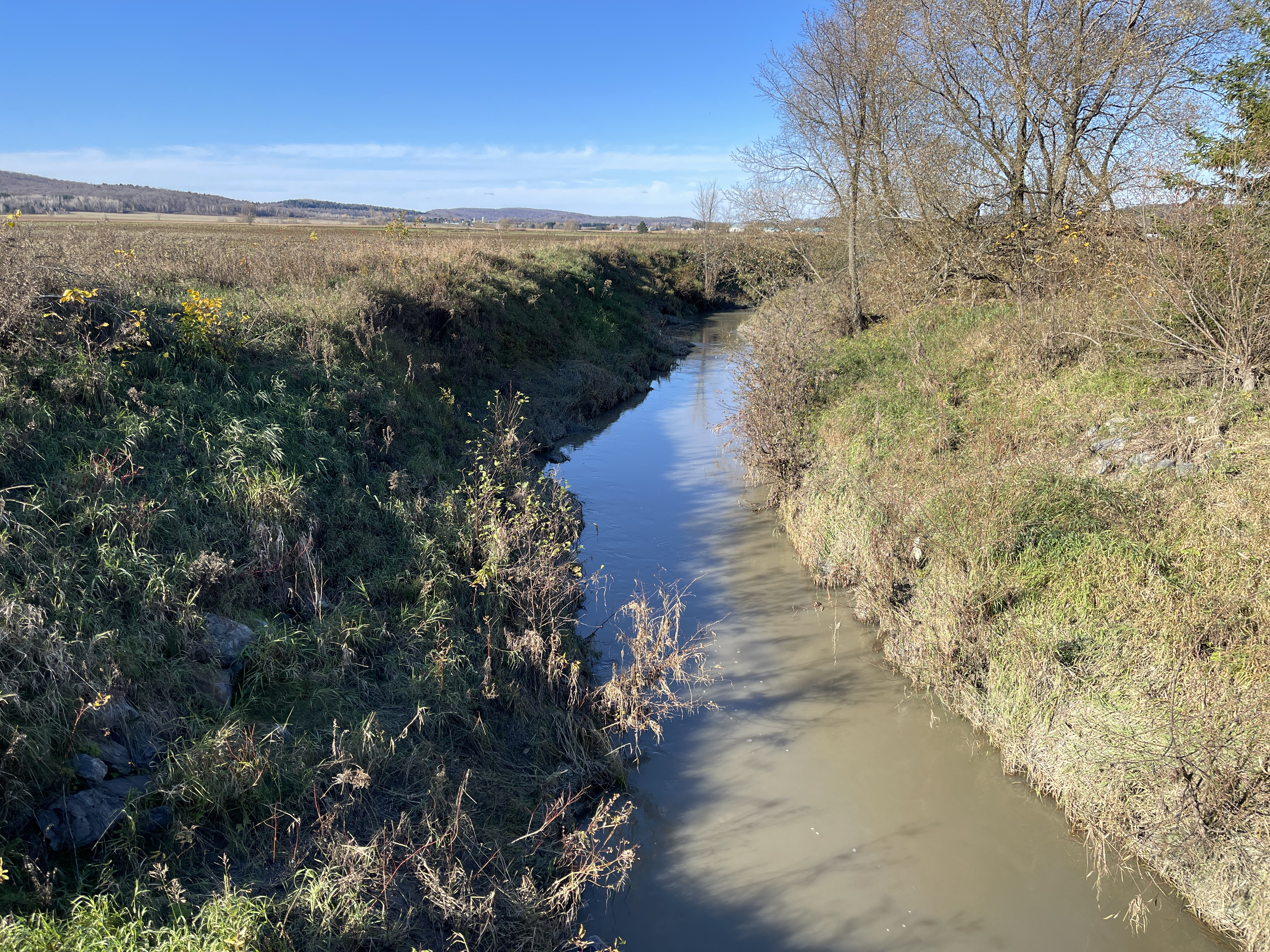
Route Bureau, from Bridge Steel & Wood P-18620, Saint-Ubalde

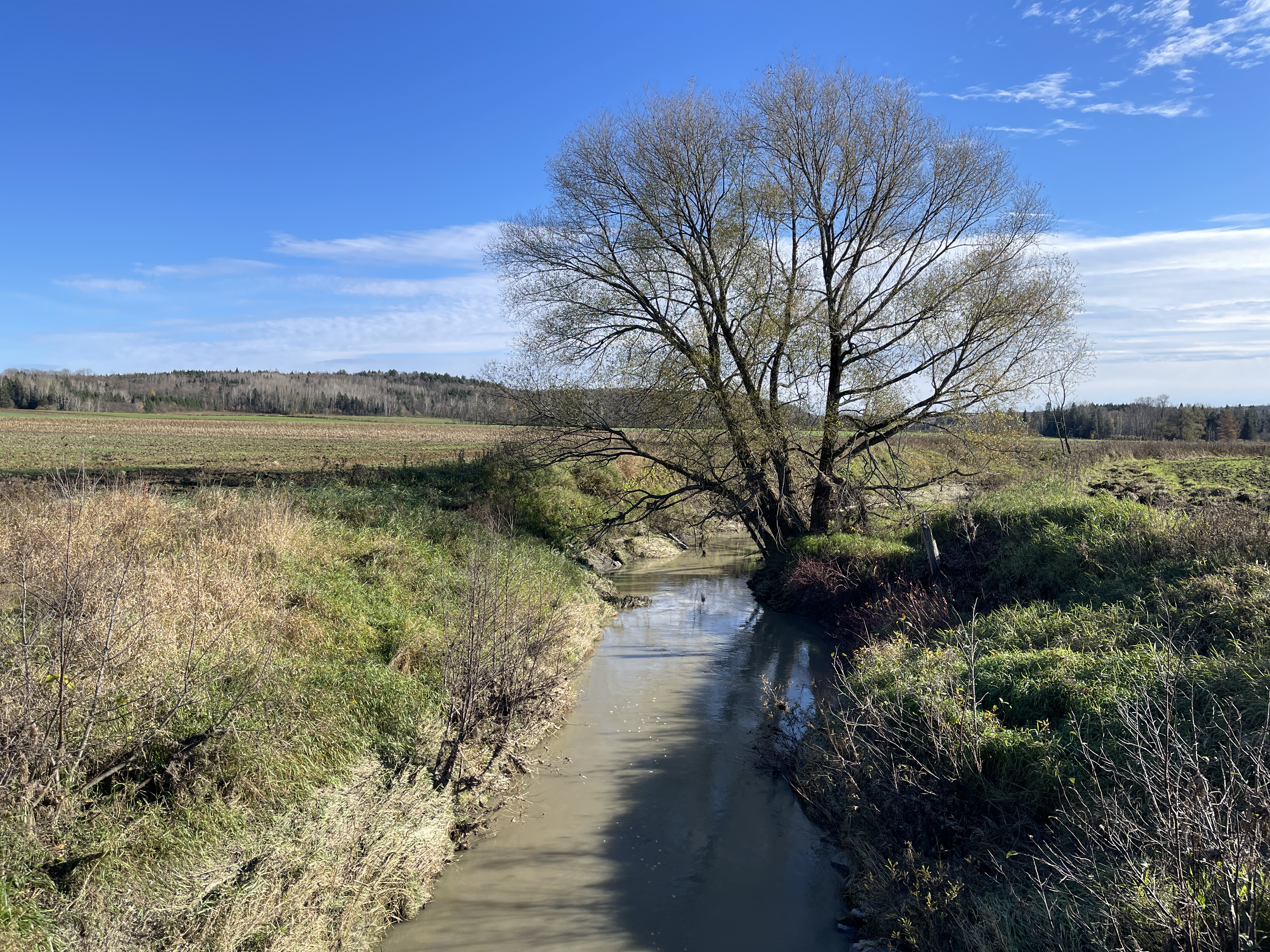
Route Bureau, from Bridge Steel & Wood P-18620, Saint-Ubalde

== See also ==
- Notre-Dame-de-Montauban
- Saint-Adelphe
- Saint-Prosper-de-Champlain
- Sainte-Anne-de-la-Pérade
- Lordship of Sainte-Anne-de-la-Pérade
- Lordship of Batiscan
- Sainte-Anne River
- Batiscan River
- Rivière à Veillet
- Lake Charest
- Mekinac Regional County Municipality
- Les Chenaux Regional County Municipality

== Externals links ==
- Portrait de la ressource en eaux souterraines (quantité et qualité) dans le sud-ouest de la Mauricie, pdf (French)
- CAPSA : organisme de bassin versant des rivières Sainte-Anne, Portneuf et secteur La Chevrotière (French)
