= Lake Charest =

Lake in Notre-Dame-de-Montauban, Quebec, Canada

Lake Charest (Mékinac)
- Location within Quebec
- Location: Quebec
- Coordinates: 46°49′52″N 72°19′31″W
- Type: Natural
- Primary outflows: Charest River
- Basin countries: Canada
- Max. length: 0.56 km (0.35 mi)
- Max. width: 0.27 km (0.17 mi)
- Settlements: Notre-Dame-de-Montauban

Lake Charest (Mékinac) is located in the area Montauban-les-Mines, in the municipality of Notre-Dame-de-Montauban, in the Mékinac Regional County Municipality (RCM), in the extreme east of the administrative region of Mauricie, in Québec, Canada.

== Geography ==
Lake Charest is located just east of the mining village of Montautan-les-Mines. It is located close to the limit of Saint-Ubalde.

The lake turns to be the head of the Charest River which, a priori, flows south-west over 1.5 kilometers in the territory of Notre-Dame-de-Montauban until the limit of Saint-Ubalde.

In Saint-Ubalde’s territory, the river flows through the rows Saint-Paul, Saint-Achilles and Sainte-Anne, going gradually away from the boundaries of the Lac-aux-Sables. In his course in Saint-Ubalde, the river recovers waters of fews lakes, including Sainte-Anne and "à la Perchaude" (perch). Then the river flows south-east (almost in parallel to the Batiscan River) and through 16 lots in the row Price in the eastern section of Saint-Adelphe, where its course becomes very coil down to its mouth.

The shape of the lake Charest resembles to a pear which is raising his hat, and the top facing north. Lake Charest has a length of 0.56 km and a maximum width of 0.27 km. Streets "Des Écureuils" (Squirrels), "du camping" et "Saint-Paul" are surrounding Charest lake.

== Toponymy ==
The name "Lake Charest" was officially registered on December 4, 1982 at the Bank of place names of Commission de toponymie du Québec (Geographical Names Board of Québec). The name "River Charest" takes its name from headwater lake of the same name. Formerly the lake Charest was designated "lake Narcisse"; this name appears on some old maps of the area.

== See also ==
- Charest River
- Sainte-Anne River
- Mauricie
- Notre-Dame-de-Montauban
- Lac-aux-Sables
- Saint-Ubalde
- Mékinac Regional County Municipality
