= Charest (surname) =

Charest is a surname. Notable people with the surname include:

- Benoît Charest (born 1964), Canadian composer and guitarist
- Isabelle Charest (born 1971), Canadian short track speed skater
- Jean Charest (born 1958), Canadian lawyer and politician, Premier of Quebec
- Johanne Charest (born 1975), Canadian chess master
- Micheline Charest (1953–2004), Canadian television producer
- Nancy Charest (1959–2014), Canadian politician
- Réal Charest, Canadian politician
- Solange Charest (born 1950), Canadian politician
- Travis Charest (born 1969), Canadian comic book artist, penciller and painter
