= Sainte-Anne-de-la-Pérade =

- Municipality
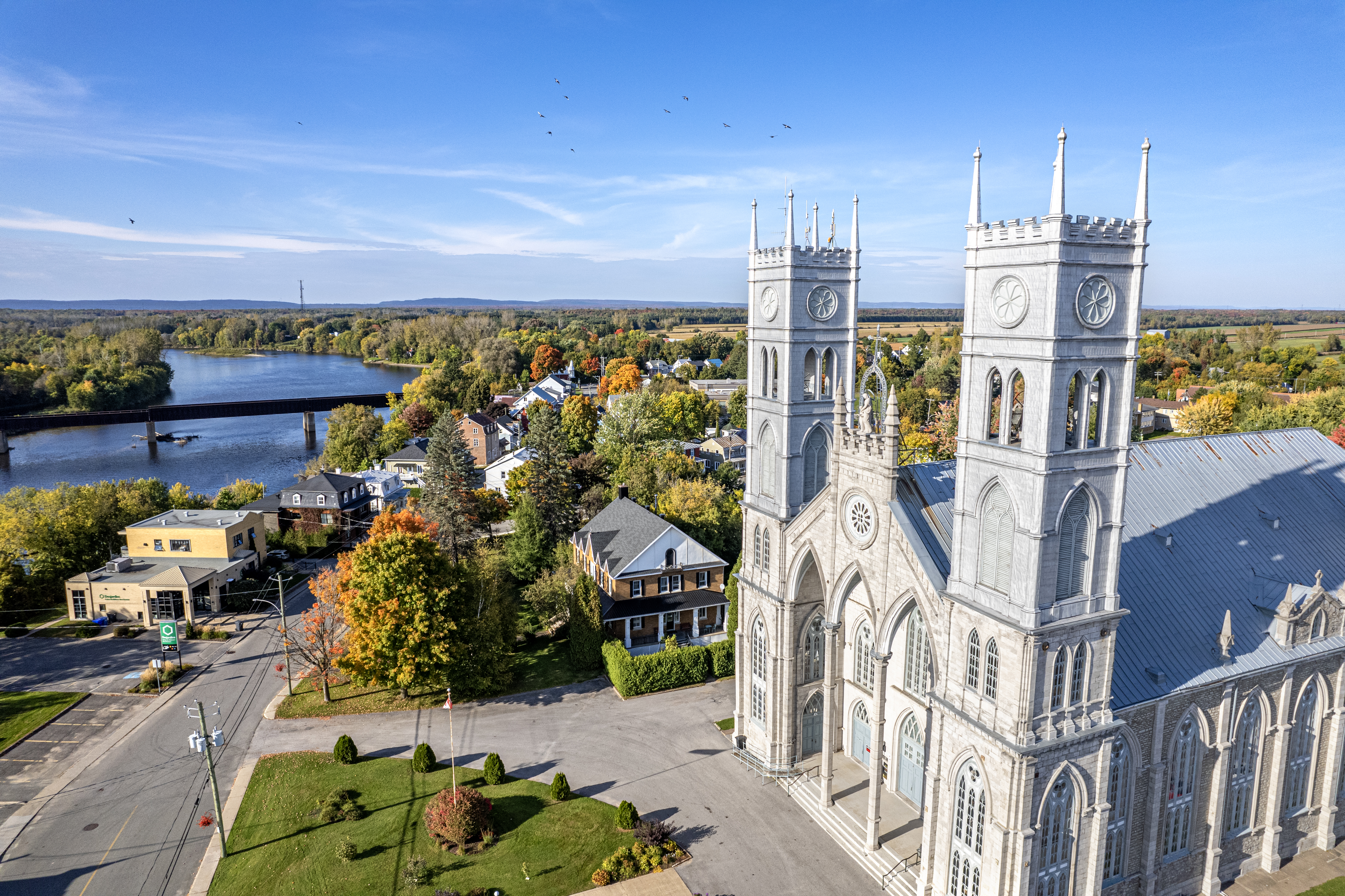
- Sainte-Anne River, Sainte-Anne St., Presbytery and parish Church
- Motto: Unis dans la foi ("United in Faith")
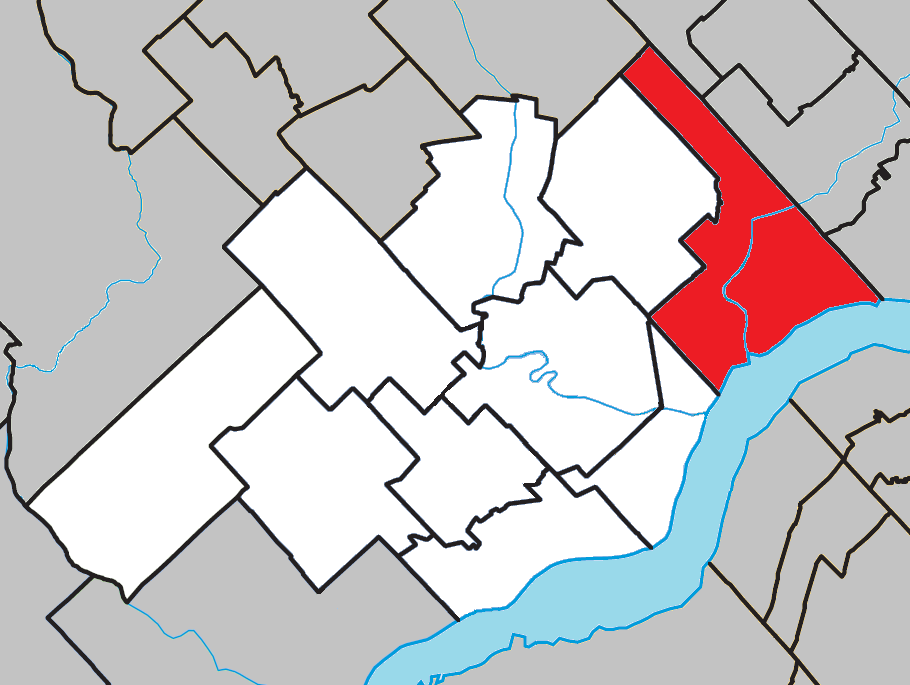
- Location within Les Chenaux RCM

- Location in central Quebec
- Coordinates: 46°35′N 72°12′W
- Country: Canada
- Province: Quebec
- Region: Mauricie
- RCM: Les Chenaux
- Settled: 1690s
- Constituted: May 10, 1989

Government
  - Mayor: Hugo-Pierre Bellemare
  - Fed. riding: Saint-Maurice—Champlain
  - Prov. riding: Champlain

Area
  - Total: 130.18 km^{2} (50.26 sq mi)
  - Land: 109.28 km^{2} (42.19 sq mi)

Population (2021)
  - Total: 2,031
  - Density: 18.6/km^{2} (48/sq mi)
  - Pop (2016-21): ▲0.6%
  - Dwellings: 1,109
- Time zone: UTC−5 (EST)
  - Summer (DST): UTC−4 (EDT)
- Postal code(s): G0X 2J0
- Area codes: 418, 581
- Highways A-40: R-138; R-159; R-354
- Website: sadlp.ca

Sainte-Anne-de-la-Pérade (French pronunciation: [sɛ̃t an də la peʁad]) is a municipality located on the north shore of the St. Lawrence River, in Les Chenaux RCM, Mauricie region, Quebec, Canada.

== History ==
On October 29, 1672, an area measuring 1.5 lieues by 1 lieue (approximately 4.8 km by 3.2 km) along the Sainte-Anne River was granted by Intendant Jean Talon as a seignory to Edmond de Suève and Thomas Tarieu de Lanouguère (also known as Lanaudière). On March 4, 1697, Governor Frontenac and Intendant Champigny granted an additional 3 lieues to Marguerite Denis, widow of Thomas Tarieu. The islands were added to the seignory on April 6, 1697, and their inclusion was confirmed on October 30, 1700. An order dated January 8, 1710, removed co-seigneur François Chorel de Saint-Romain d'Orvilliers and awarded the islands to Pierre-Thomas Tarieu de la Pérade, son of Thomas Tarieu and husband of Madeleine de Verchères, a Quebec heroine, who at the age of 14, successfully defended her parents’ fort against a group of Iroquois. In April 1735, another expansion was granted to Pierre-Thomas Tarieu, after which the Sainte-Anne-de-la-Pérade Seignory came to bear his name.

The Parish of Sainte-Anne-de-la-Pérade was established in 1693. The post office opened in 1820. In 1845, the parish municipality was created, but it was abolished two years later during province-wide municipal restructuring. It was reestablished in 1855. In 1912, the village separated from the parish municipality and was incorporated as the Village Municipality of La Pérade.

In May 1989, the village and parish municipalities merged to form the new Municipality of Sainte-Anne-de-la-Pérade. On December 31, 2001, it was transferred from the Francheville Regional County Municipality to the newly created Les Chenaux Regional County Municipality, following the creation of the new City of Trois-Rivières and the dissolution of the Francheville RCM.

== Geography ==
Sainte-Anne-de-la-Pérade stretches on each side of the Sainte-Anne River until its confluence with the St. Lawrence River.

The main accesses are the Félix-Leclerc highway (Autoroute 40) and the Chemin du Roy that stretches from Montreal to Quebec City, a historic segment of Quebec Route 138. The Sainte-Anne River is no longer navigable since the silting caused by the Saint-Alban 1894 Landslide.

== Demographics ==
In 2021, Statistics Canada counted a population of 2,031 people and 978 private dwellings. The area of the municipality was 109.28 square km (42.19 square mi), and the population density was 18.6 people per square kilometer (7.18 people per square mile).

Historical census populations – Sainte-Anne-de-la-Pérade
Year	Pop.	±%
1991	2,213	—
1996	2,181	−1.4%
2001	2,151	−1.4%
2006	1,991	−7.4%
2011	2,072	+4.1%
2016	2,019	−2.6%
2021	2,031	+0.6%
Source: Statistics Canada

Private dwellings occupied by usual residents (2021): 978 (total dwellings: 1,109)

Mother tongue:

- English as first language: 0.8%
- French as first language: 97.0%
- English and French as first languages: 1.0%
- Other as first language: 1.0%

== Attractions ==
The centerpiece of the municipality is the Sainte-Anne-de-la-Pérade church, a Roman Catholic temple located at the intersection of rue Sainte-Anne and boulevard Lanaudière (Chemin du Roy or Route 138), facing the Sainte-Anne River. Its architecture is inspired by that of the Notre-Dame Basilica (Montreal).

=== Tommy cod fishing ===
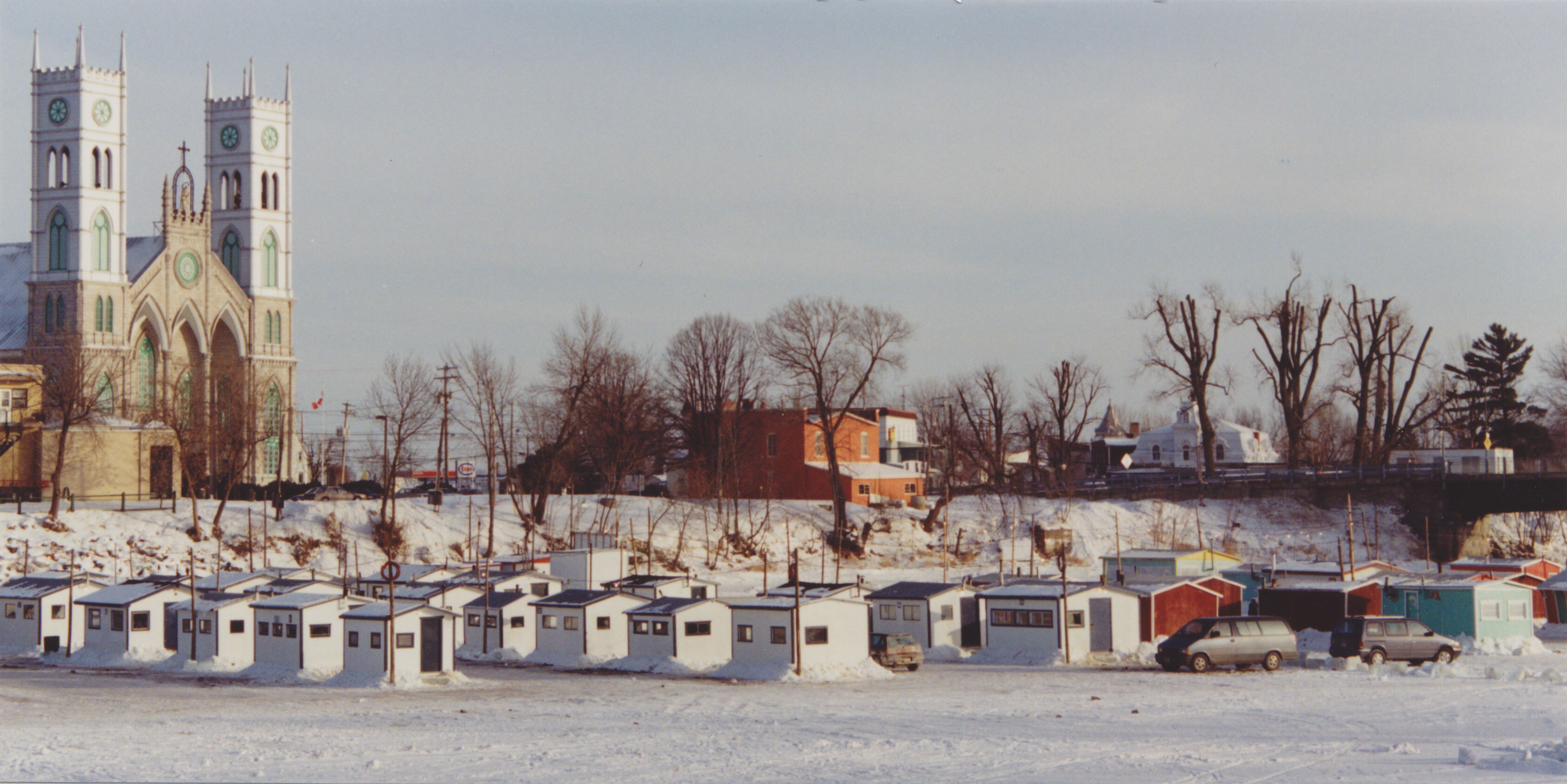
Ice fishing village on the Sainte-Anne River

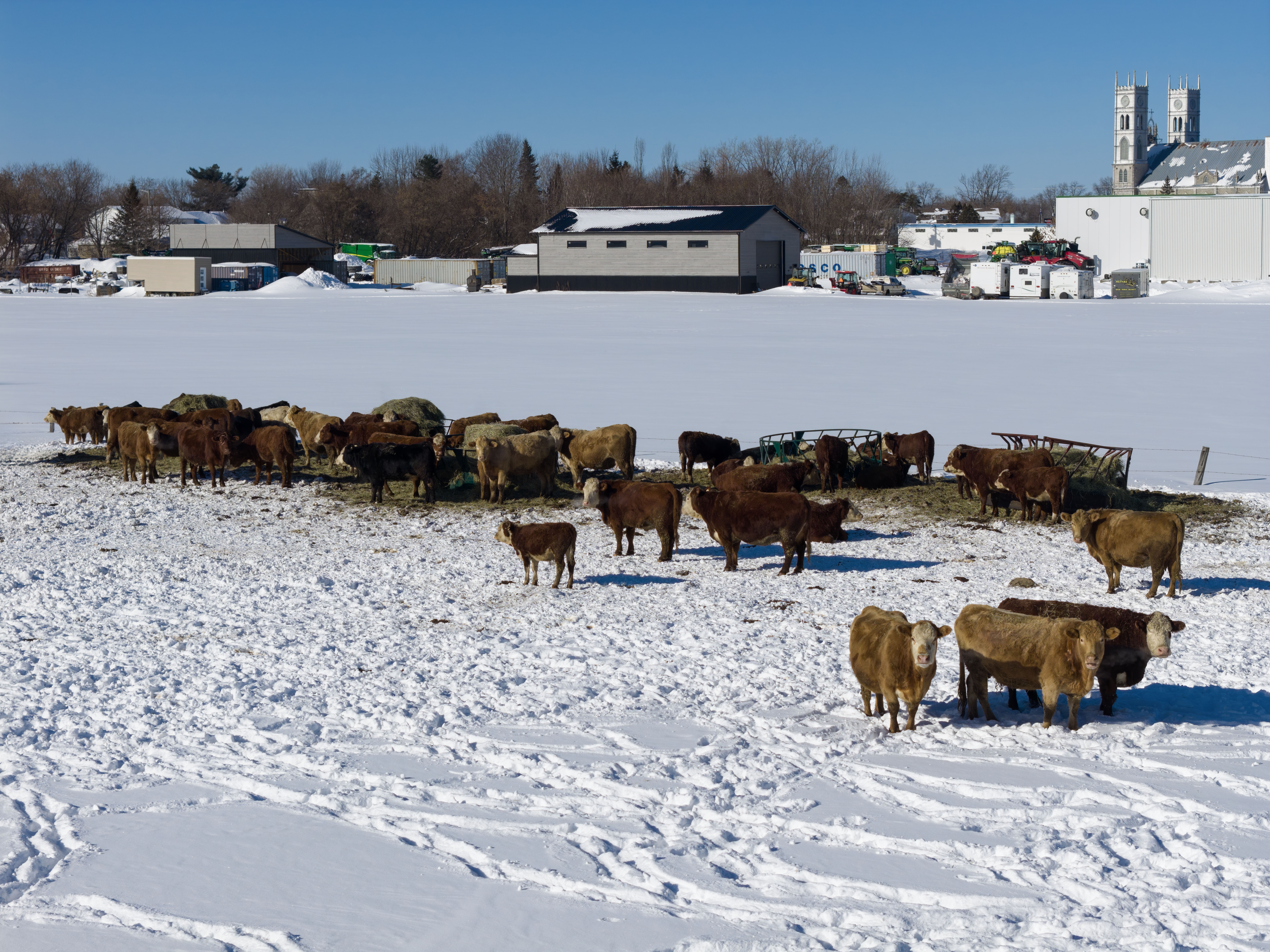
Cattle in a snowy pasture

In the heart of the village, as soon as the ice freezes in December, the mouth of the Sainte-Anne River becomes the world capital of Tommy Cod fishing. During Tommy Cod season, officially from the 26th of December to the 14th of February, thousands of tourists come to Sainte-Anne-de-la-Pérade for ice fishing and a small fishing village is built on the frozen waters of the Sainte-Anne River, which then forms a link between the shores.

=== Environmental protection ===
The Grondines and Sainte-Anne-de-la-Pérade swamp is one of the last remaining large, treed swamps on the river. It extends along seven kilometres of shoreline in the Estuary of St. Lawrence. The swamp is home to several endangered species, including plants that are endemic to the freshwater estuary.

Since 2008, the Nature Conservancy of Canada (NCC) has participated in the restoration of 40 hectares of the Grondines and Sainte-Anne-de-la-Pérade marsh, where 2,500 trees have been planted. In 2018, the project attempted to raise awareness among the local population of the richness of the environment and to encourage actions to protect it, including a conference on birds of prey, a guided tour on the ornithology and entomology of the area, a guided tour on the facilities favorable to wildlife, and school outings.

== Government ==
List of former mayors:

- Gilles Devault (...–2009)
- Yvon Lafond (2009–2013)
- Diane Aubut (2013–2021)
- Suzanne Rompré (2021–2025)
- Hugo-Pierre Bellemare (2025–present)

== See also ==
- Saint-Alban, municipality
- Trou du Diable, cave in Saint-Casimir
- Charest River, tributary of Sainte-Anne River
- Sainte-Anne River (Les Chenaux)
- Saint-Anne Seignorial Estate
