= William Amherst (British Army officer) =

British Lieutenant-General and politician

Lieutenant-General William Amherst
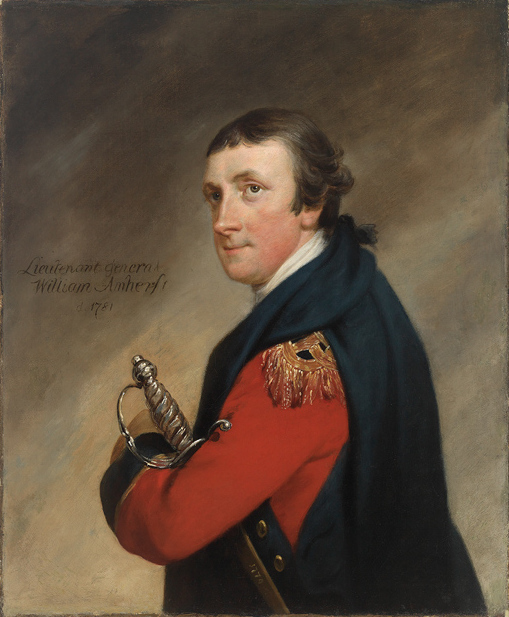

Member of the Great Britain Parliament for Hythe
- In office 1766–1768 Serving with George Germain
- Preceded by: William Glanville; George Germain
- Succeeded by: John Sawbridge; William Evelyn

Member of the Great Britain Parliament for Launceston
- In office 1768–1774 Serving with Humphry Morice
- Preceded by: Peter Burrell; Humphry Morice
- Succeeded by: John Buller; Humphry Morice

Personal details
- Born: 5 March 1732 Sevenoaks, Kent
- Died: 13 May 1781 (aged 49) England
- Military career
- Relatives: William Amherst, 1st Earl Amherst (son); Elizabeth Amherst Hale (daughter)
- Allegiance: Great Britain
- Branch: British Army
- Rank: Lieutenant-General
- Conflicts: Seven Years' War

Lieutenant-General William Amherst (5 February 1732 – 13 May 1781) was a British Army officer and politician. During the Seven Years' War, he led British forces that recaptured St. John's, Newfoundland from the French at the 1762 Battle of Signal Hill.

== Early life ==
William Amherst was born, in Sevenoaks, Kent, into a family of lawyers. He married Elizabeth Amherst (nee Patterson). Their children included:

- William Pitt Amherst, 1st Earl Amherst of Arracan, GCH, PC, a future Governor-General of India
- Elizabeth Frances Amherst

== Seven Years' War ==
Amherst was commissioned as an ensign in the First Regiment of Foot Guards in 1755. He eventually rose to the rank of lieutenant general in 1779. As a lieutenant colonel, Amherst was instrumental in the re-capture of St. John's from the French in 1762 at the Battle of Signal Hill. An area near Signal Hill at the entrance of St. John's harbour is named "Fort Amherst" in commemoration of his victory in 1762.

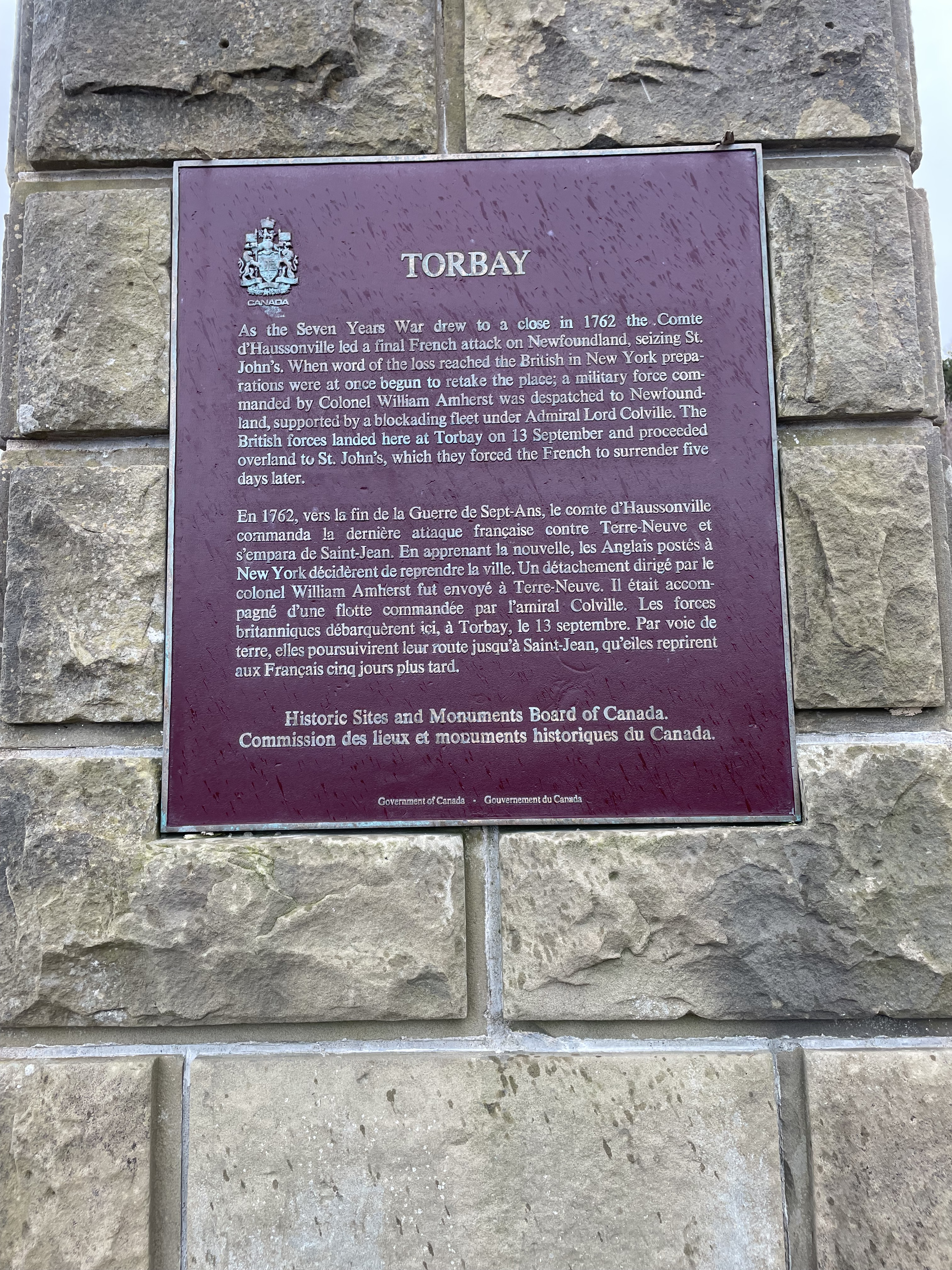
Plaque commemorating Amherst's landing at Torbay

In 1766 he became Member of Parliament for Hythe, and in 1768 he became MP for Launceston until 1774.

In 1769 he built a house in Ryde, on the Isle of Wight. He named the house and estate St John's, after his victory in Newfoundland. The neighborhood of Ryde that surrounds the house is still known by that name.

He was appointed Adjutant-General to the Forces in 1778: he died while serving in that role in 1781.

== Notes ==
Parliament of Great Britain
| Preceded by Lord George Sackville; William Glanville | Member of Parliament for Hythe; 1766 – 1768; With: Lord George Sackville | Succeeded by John Sawbridge; William Evelyn |
| Preceded by Peter Burrell; Humphry Morice | Member of Parliament for Launceston; 1768 – 1774; With: Humphry Morice | Succeeded by John Buller; Humphry Morice |
Military offices
| Preceded by Edward Harvey | Adjutant General; 1778–1781 | Succeeded by Sir William Fawcett |
| Preceded by Robert Robinson | Colonel of the 32nd (Cornwall) Regiment of Foot; 1775–1781 | Succeeded by The Earl of Ross |
