= Reference re Genetic Non‑Discrimination Act =

2020 Supreme Court of Canada decision

- Supreme Court of Canada

Hearing: October 10, 2019 Judgment: July 10, 2020
- Citations: 2020 SCC 17, [2020] 2 SCR 283
- Docket No.: 38478
- Prior history: Reference to QCCA held act ultra vires 2018 QCCA 2193

Court membership
- Chief Justice: Richard Wagner; Puisne Justices: Rosalie Abella, Michael Moldaver, Andromache Karakatsanis, Suzanne Côté, Russell Brown, Malcolm Rowe, Sheilah Martin, Nicholas Kasirer

Reasons given
- Plurality: Karakatsanis, joined by Abella, Martin
- Concurrence: Moldaver, joined by Côté
- Dissent: Kasirer, joined by Wagner C.J. and Brown, Rowe

Reference re Genetic Non‑Discrimination Act, 2020 SCC 17, (Note: Reference re Genetic Non‑Discrimination Act, 2020 SCC 17, Supreme Court (Canada)) is a Supreme Court of Canada decision that held the Genetic Non-Discrimination Act was validly enacted by Parliament under criminal law power of section 91(27) of the Constitution Act, 1867. The Genetic Non-Discrimination Act passed by Parliament in 2017, prohibits requiring an individual to undergo or disclose the results of a genetic test as a condition for accessing goods or services or for entering into a contract. It also establishes rules governing the use and disclosure of genetic test results.

The government of Quebec referred the legislation to the Quebec Court of Appeal, which unanimously held that the Act was ultra vires Parliament's jurisdiction over criminal law under section 91(27) of the Constitution Act, 1867. The matter was subsequently appealed to the Supreme Court of Canada, where a majority held that the Genetic Non-Discrimination Act was a valid exercise of Parliament's criminal law power.

The reference was notable because the Attorney General of Canada argued against the constitutionality of the legislation, which had been enacted as a private member's bill contrary to the Attorney General's advice.

== Background ==
Senators James Cowan and Jennifer O'Connell introduced the Genetic Non-Discrimination Act (Bill S-201) as a private member's bill during the 2nd Session of the 41st Parliament, and again in December 2015 during the 1st Session of the 42nd Parliament. The Act was intended to prevent genetic discrimination in unfair insurance and employment practices.

The Senate passed Bill S-201 in April 2016. Later that year, Minister of Justice and Attorney General Jody Wilson-Raybould stated that the proposed legislation was likely ultra vires Parliament's criminal law power under section 91(27) of the Constitution Act, 1867, citing the Supreme Court's decision in Reference re Assisted Human Reproduction Act. She indicated that the government could not support the bill. Her position raised questions about whether the Attorney General has a duty to defend legislation passed by Parliament that they believe to be unconstitutional.

Despite the government's opposition, the House of Commons passed Bill S-201 on March 8, 2017, in a free vote, with support from Liberal backbenchers and opposition parties.

=== Contents of the Genetic Non-Discrimination Act ===
The Genetic Non-Discrimination Act defined a "genetic test" as "a test that analyzes DNA, RNA or chromosomes for purposes such as the prediction of disease or vertical transmission risks, or monitoring, diagnosis or prognosis." (Note: Genetic Non-Discrimination Act, S.C. 2017, c. 3, s. 2 (Genetic Non-Discrimination Act at CanLII)) It established three main prohibitions: first, requiring an individual to undergo a genetic test as a condition for providing goods or services or for entering into a contract; second, requiring an individual to disclose the results of a genetic test as such a condition; and third, disclosing the results of a genetic test without the individual's written consent. (Note: Genetic Non-Discrimination Act, S.C. 2017, c. 3, s. 3–5 (Genetic Non-Discrimination Act at CanLII))

A breach of any of these prohibitions constituted a hybrid offence. Upon summary conviction, an person was liable to a fine of up to $300,000, imprisonment for up to twelve months, or both. Upon conviction on indictment, the maximum penalty increased to a fine of up to $1 million, imprisonment for up to five years, or both. (Note: Genetic Non-Discrimination Act, S.C. 2017, c. 3, s. 7 (Genetic Non-Discrimination Act at CanLII))

The Act also included exceptions for health care practitioners and related circumstances, such as where the use or disclosure of genetic information was necessary for medical care or research. (Note: Genetic Non-Discrimination Act, S.C. 2017, c. 3, s. 6 (Genetic Non-Discrimination Act at CanLII))

== Quebec Court of Appeal ==
The government of Quebec referred the Genetic Non-Discrimination Act to the Quebec Court of Appeal for a constitutional opinion. A five-judge panel, composed of Chief Justice of Quebec Nicole Duval Hesler, and justices Marie-France Bich, Dominique Bélanger, Manon Savard, and Robert M. Mainville, heard the reference. The Court unanimously held that sections 1 to 7 of the Genetic Non-Discrimination Act were unconstitutional, as they did not fall within Parliament's jurisdiction over criminal law under section 91(27) of the Constitution Act, 1867. (Note: In the matter of the: Reference of the Government of Quebec concerning the constitutionality of the Genetic Non-Discrimination Act enacted by Sections 1 to 7 of the Act to prohibit and prevent genetic discrimination, 2018 QCCA 2193 at para 27, Court of Appeal (Quebec, Canada))

The reference question asked: "Is the Genetic Non-Discrimination Act enacted by sections 1 to 7 of the Act to prohibit and prevent genetic discrimination, ultra vires to the jurisdiction of the Parliament of Canada over criminal law under paragraph 91(27) of the Constitution Act, 1867?" (Note: In the matter of the: Reference of the Government of Quebec concerning the constitutionality of the Genetic Non-Discrimination Act enacted by Sections 1 to 7 of the Act to prohibit and prevent genetic discrimination, 2018 QCCA 2193 at para 1, Court of Appeal (Quebec, Canada))

Because the Attorney General of Canada declined to defend the legislation's constitutionality, the Court appointed Douglas Mitchell as amicus curiae. Interveners included the Canadian Life and Health Insurance Association, the Canadian Human Rights Commission, and the Canadian Coalition for Genetic Fairness.

In its pith and substance analysis, the Court concluded that only section 9 of the Act directly prohibited genetic discrimination, while sections 1 to 7 were primarily intended to "encourage the use of genetic tests in order to improve the health of Canadians by suppressing the fear of some that this information could eventually serve discriminatory purposes in the entering of agreements of in the provision of goods and services, particularly insurance and employment contracts." (Note: In the matter of the: Reference of the Government of Quebec concerning the constitutionality of the Genetic Non-Discrimination Act enacted by Sections 1 to 7 of the Act to prohibit and prevent genetic discrimination, 2018 QCCA 2193 at para 11, Court of Appeal (Quebec, Canada)) The Court determined that promoting positive health outcomes did not constitute a valid criminal law purpose, such as addressing a "real public health evil." (Note: In the matter of the: Reference of the Government of Quebec concerning the constitutionality of the Genetic Non-Discrimination Act enacted by Sections 1 to 7 of the Act to prohibit and prevent genetic discrimination, 2018 QCCA 2193 at para 24, Court of Appeal (Quebec, Canada))

== Supreme Court of Canada ==
On October 10, 2019, the Supreme Court of Canada heard the appeal from the decision of the Quebec Court of Appeal. On July 10, 2020, the Court released its judgment, with a 5–4 plurality holding that the Genetic Non-Discrimination Act was validly enacted under Parliament's criminal law power in section 91(27) of the Constitution Act, 1867.

The majority and dissenting opinions diverged on the law's pith and substance and on whether a threat of harm, as opposed to actual harm, is required to ground a valid criminal law purpose. The majority found that the Act's pith and substance was the protection of individuals' control over their genetic information in a broad number of circumstances. The dissent found the pith and substance instead as the regulation of contracts and the provision of goods and services with the objective of promoting the health of Canadians.

With respect to the criminal law purpose, the justices also disagreed on the scope of "evil" within the meaning of the criminal law power and on the evidentiary threshold for demonstrating harm. The majority held that Parliament may legislate in response to a credible threat of harm to public interests traditionally protected by criminal law, without requiring proof of actual harm, but a "apprehension of harm." The dissent adopted a narrower view, concluding that speculative risks were insufficient to ground a valid criminal law purpose.

=== Circumstances of the appeal ===
The Supreme Court of Canada heard the appeal brought by the Canadian Coalition for Genetic Fairness from the decision of the Quebec Court of Appeal. The Attorney General of Canada did not defend the constitutionality of the Genetic Non-Discrimination Act and instead made submissions asserting that the legislation was ultra vires Parliament's authority.

The Court granted leave to six interveners: the Attorneys General of British Columbia and Saskatchewan, the Canadian Life and Health Insurance Association, the Canadian Human Rights Commission, the Privacy Commissioner of Canada, and the Canadian College of Medical Geneticists.

=== Karakatsanis plurality ===
Justice Karakatsanis, writing for herself and Justices Abella and Martin, held that the Genetic Non-Discrimination Act was a valid constitutional exercise of Parliament's criminal law power.

In characterizing the legislation, Justice Karakatsanis determined that its pith and substance was to "protect individuals' control over their detailed personal information disclosed by genetic tests" in the context of "contracting and provision of goods and services." She further noted that the Act sought to address fears of discrimination arising from genetic test results that threaten an individual's "autonomy, privacy, and equality." (Note: Reference re Genetic Non‑Discrimination Act, 2020 SCC 17 at paras 63–65, 92, Supreme Court (Canada))

Justice Karakatsanis classified the law under Parliament's criminal law power in section 92(27) of the Constitution Act, 1867. Applying the three elements of the criminal law power identified in the Margarine Reference, a prohibition, a penalty, and a valid criminal law purpose, she found that the Act clearly contained both a prohibition and a penalty. With respect to the third element, the criminal law purpose, Justice Karakatsanis, citing Chief Justice McLachlin in the Reference Re Assisted Human Reproduction Act, held that a valid purpose exists where Parliament acts in response to a "reasoned or reasonable apprehension of harm" affecting "a public interest traditionally protected by the criminal law or a similar public interest." (Note: Reference re Genetic Non‑Discrimination Act, 2020 SCC 17 at para 75, Supreme Court (Canada)) Protecting public health was a traditional criminal law purpose. In this case, the legislation sought to prevent genetic discrimination that might deter individuals from undergoing genetic testing, thereby impeding their ability to obtain medical information or treatment for genetic conditions. (Note: Reference re Genetic Non‑Discrimination Act, 2020 SCC 17 at paras 93–102, Supreme Court (Canada))

=== Moldaver concurrence ===
Justice Moldaver, writing for himself and Justice Côté, concurred in the result reached by Justice Karakatsanis, agreeing that the Genetic Non-Discrimination Act was a valid constitutional exercise of Parliament's criminal law power.

Justice Moldaver adopted a narrower view of the Act's pith and substance, concluding that its purpose was to "protect health by prohibiting conduct that undermines individuals' control over the intimate information revealed by genetic testing" through the prohibition of compulsory genetic testing and the regulation of the disclosure of such information. (Note: Reference re Genetic Non‑Discrimination Act, 2020 SCC 17 at para 136, Supreme Court (Canada)) He classified the law's criminal law purpose as relating to the protection of public health, not to combat genetic discrimination per se, but to prevent the adverse health consequences that may arise when individuals avoid genetic testing due to fears that the results could be misused. (Note: Reference re Genetic Non‑Discrimination Act, 2020 SCC 17 at paras 143–150, Supreme Court (Canada))

=== Kasirer dissent ===
Justice Kasirer, writing for himself and Justices Wagner, Rowe, and Brown, held that the Genetic Non-Discrimination Act was ultra vires Parliament's criminal law power.

In characterizing the legislation, Justice Kasirer found that its pith and substance was to "regulate contracts and the provision of goods and services, in particular contracts of insurance and employment, by prohibiting some perceived misuses of one category of genetic tests, the whole with a view to promoting the health of Canadians." (Note: Reference re Genetic Non‑Discrimination Act, 2020 SCC 17 at para 154, Supreme Court (Canada)) He concluded that the protection against genetic discrimination and the control of private information were secondary features of the Act. (Note: Reference re Genetic Non‑Discrimination Act, 2020 SCC 17 at para 203, Supreme Court (Canada))

Justice Kasirer classified the legislation under the provincial head of power over property and civil rights in section 92(13) of the Constitution Act, 1867, as it principally affected insurance and employment contracts. (Note: Reference re Genetic Non‑Discrimination Act, 2020 SCC 17 at para 272, Supreme Court (Canada))

In articulating the scope of the criminal law power, Justice Kasirer held that Parliament must be responding to a threat that is "real," meaning that it has a concrete basis and a reasoned apprehension of harm. (Note: Reference re Genetic Non‑Discrimination Act, 2020 SCC 17 at para 234, Supreme Court (Canada)) In his view, merely addressing undesirable effects was insufficient to satisfy the requirement of an "evil" within the meaning of the criminal law purpose. (Note: Reference re Genetic Non‑Discrimination Act, 2020 SCC 17 at para 232, Supreme Court (Canada)) Instead, the legislation must respond to a well-defined threat supported by an evidentiary foundation demonstrating actual or imminent harm.
