= Adam Mabane =

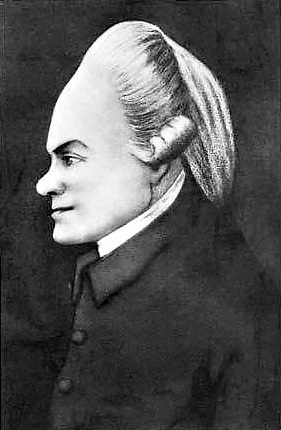

Adam Mabane (c. 1734 – January 3, 1792) was a physician, judge and political figure in the early Province of Quebec.

He was born in Scotland around 1734. He was a surgeon's assistant in the British army led by Amherst and came to Quebec in 1760. Mabane served at the military hospital in the town of Quebec and also set up in private practice as a doctor there. In 1764, he was named to the Council of Quebec and became a judge in the Court of Common Pleas for Quebec district. He was dismissed from the council after the arrival of a new lieutenant governor, Guy Carleton, in 1766. In 1775, he was named to the Legislative Council and became a leader of the French party in the council. After Peter Livius was dismissed from office as Chief Justice of Quebec in 1786, Mabane assumed many of the duties associated with that position. Although the Legislative Council supported the introduction of habeas corpus for criminal cases in 1784, Mabane and the French party opposed the introduction of the principles of English civil law into the province, seeing this as contrary to the Quebec Act.

When new councils were established by the Constitutional Act of 1791, Mabane was named to both the Executive and Legislative Councils. However he died in Sillery, Lower Canada, in January 1792, before he could be sworn into office.
