= Stephen W. Scherer =

Canadian scientist (born 1964)

- Dr. Stephen Scherer, Chief of Research
- Born: Stephen Wayne Scherer; January 5, 1964 (age 62); Windsor, Ontario, Canada
- Education: University of Waterloo (B.Sc.); University of Toronto (M.Sc., Ph.D.)
- Spouse: Jo-Anne Herbrick (m. 2002)
- Children: 2

Stephen Wayne "Steve" Scherer (born January 5, 1964) is a Canadian scientist who serves as the Chief of Research at The Hospital for Sick Children (SickKids) and distinguished University Professor at the University of Toronto. He obtained his PhD at the University of Toronto under Professor Lap-chee Tsui. Together they founded the Centre for Applied Genomics (TCAG). He is a Senior Fellow of Massey College at the University of Toronto. In 2014, he was named an esteemed Clarivate (previously Thomson Reuters) Citation laureate in Physiology or Medicine for the “Discovery of large-scale gene copy number variation and its association with specific diseases.” In 2026, he was the first Canadian to receive the King Salman International Award for Disability Research.

== Background ==
Scherer was born in Windsor, Ontario, and attended Riverside High School. He played competitive hockey and baseball winning provincial and national championships. He completed his Honours Science Degree at the University of Waterloo, Master of Science and Doctor of Philosophy in the Faculty of Medicine at the University of Toronto.

== Research ==
Scherer has co-published over 750 scholarly papers and book chapters. He has been on the World's Most Influential Scientific Minds list (2015–2018). His Google Scholar h-index=175; 153,000 citations. In 2023, with Ronald D. Cohn and Ada Hamosh, he edited Thompson & Thompson Genetics and Genomics in Medicine, 9th Edition, Elsevier Publishers.

=== Chromosome mapping ===
From 1988 to 2003 with Lap-Chee Tsui, Scherer led studies of human chromosome 7, in particular in the mapping phase of the Human Genome Project. Through collaborative research, genes involved in holoprosencephaly, renal carcinoma, Williams syndrome, sacral agenesis, citrullinemia, renal tubular acidosis and others were identified. His group also discovered the largest gene in the genome. The sum of this work, including contributions from scientists worldwide and J. Craig Venter's Celera Genomics, generated a map and sequence of human chromosome 7. In other chromosome studies with Berge Minassian, disease genes causing severe forms of epilepsy were identified.

=== Discovery of frequent gene copy number variation (CNV) events ===
Scherer's research contributed to the description of genome-wide copy number variations (CNVs) of genes, including defining CNV as a highly abundant form of human genetic variation. Previous theory held that humans were 99.9% DNA identical with the small difference in variation almost entirely accounted for by some 3 million single nucleotide polymorphisms (SNPs) per genome. Larger genomic CNV changes involving losses or gains of thousands or millions of nucleotides encompassing one or several genes were thought to be exceptionally rare, and almost always involved in disease. Scherer's observations of frequent CNV events found in the genomes of all cells in every individual, co-published with Canadian-Korean scientist Charles Lee working at Harvard in 2004, opened a new window for studies of natural genetic variation, evolution and disease. Scherer founded the Database of Genomic Variants, a public database utilized by clinical laboratories around the world to interpret CNV and structural variation data in diagnostics. Scherer, Lee and collaborators led by Matthew Hurles at the Wellcome Trust Sanger Institute, as well as scientists at the University of Tokyo and Affymetrix Corp then generated CNV maps of human DNA revealing the structural properties, mechanisms of formation, and population genetics of this ubiquitous form of natural variation. These studies discovered that CNVs number in the thousands per genome and encompass at least ten times more DNA letters than SNPs, revealing a 'dynamic patchwork' structure of chromosomes. These findings were further substantiated through work with J. Craig Venter's team, which contributed to the completion of the genome sequence of an individual.

=== Autism-associated CNVs and genes ===
From 2003 to 2010, Scherer and collaborators went on to discover numerous disease-associated CNVs, and the corresponding disease-susceptibility genes in upwards of 10% of individuals with autism spectrum disorder. These discoveries have led to broadly available tests facilitating early diagnostic information for autism.

Similar discoveries to those made in autism were also found in schizophrenia, intellectual disability and other brain disorders (with often the same genes/CNVs involved), thereby establishing a new paradigm to explain how complex human behavioral conditions can have a genetic (biological) basis. With Jacob Vorstman, Christian Schaaf and colleagues, Scherer developed the EAGLE (Evaluation of Autism Gene Link Evidence), which is a highly utilized resource in diagnostic testing for autism.

=== Determining the genome architecture underlying autism ===
Scherer has led the Autism Speaks MSSNG project, which uses whole genome sequencing to decode the DNA of thousands of families having a diagnosis of autism. The research underpinned the identification of >100 genes and CNVs involved in autism providing explanations of why autism has occurred for approximately 20% of families. These discoveries have enabled faster and more precise diagnoses, early intervention and genetic counselling and have led to the identification of new molecular pathways for the development of therapeutics. In 2022, Scherer's team published a comprehensive description of the genomic architecture in autism using whole genome sequencing data available to facilitate research studies in autism. In 2024, he led a study that identified that rare variants in the DDX53 gene on the X-chromosome contribute to autism. In 2026, Scherer led a study published in Nature that linked the non-coding gene PTCHD1-AS to social and repetitive behavioural traits associated with autism.

=== Genome science, data and public policy infrastructure ===
Scherer co-founded the TCAG genome centre at SickKids in 1998. In 2015 with Marco Marra and Steven Jones at the University of British Columbia and Mark Lathrop at McGill University, the three major Canadian genome centres came together as CGEn, which serves as a Major Science Initiative of the Canada Foundation of Innovation. For the 150th anniversary of Canada (2017), he started the CanSeq150 Project to sequence 150 genomes of species most relevant to Canada's culture/environment/conservation; notable species completed include many of the “canadensis” members such as the Canadian beaver and Canadian wolverine. Canseq 150 is now part of the Canadian Biogenome Project, an international effort aiming to sequence the genetic material for all complex life on earth. CGEn also led the COVID-19 host genome sequencing project, which completed 10,000 Canadian genomes in April 2022.

Scherer and colleagues launched the Personal Genome Project Canada in 2007, a resource of data that supports evaluation of whole genome sequencing in medicine and public health. These experiences along Scherer's advocacy with the Canadian Coalition for Genetic Fairness helped to establish Canada's Genetic Non-Discrimination Act, which passed into law on May 4, 2017. He is also Editor-in-Chief of the scientific journal npj Genomic Medicine, which was co-founded in 2016 with Dr. Magdalena Skipper the current Editor-in-Chief of Nature.

== Media and special presentations ==
Scherer's discoveries have appeared in the Globe and Mail, New York Times, Washington Post, The Independent, Time, Newsweek, Scientific American and many other periodicals. He has appeared on the Canadian Broadcasting Corporation (CBC), PBS Newshour, TVO Agenda, and other national TV, radio, and media, including Quirks and Quarks, explaining scientific discoveries. His research was featured in Roger Martin's book The Design of Business, Bob Wright's autobiography the Wright Stuff: from NBC to Autism Speaks, Steve Silberman’s NeuroTribes: The Legacy of Autism and the Future of Neurodiversity, amongst others. In 2013, he spoke at the Canadian Broadcast Glenn Gould Studio: ‘Cracking the Autism Enigma’, and in 2015 was a special guest speaker at the United Nations, New York for World Autism Awareness Day. He has been featured the Genome Giants series of interviews. He served as the scientific consultant for two documentaries, the MediCinema Film creation Cracking the Code, the continuing saga of genetics, and the Gemini Award-winning documentary, After Darwin by GalaFilms-Telefilm Canada. He also hosts the SickKids Discovery Dialogues which takes attendees behind the scenes of research to discuss their research and the path to scientific discovery.

== Honours ==
- Canada's Top 40 under 40 Award (1999)
- Scholar of the Howard Hughes Medical Institute (2002–2007)
- Genetics Society of Canada Scientist Award (2002)
- Canadian Institute for Advanced Research Explorer Award (2002)
- Steacie Prize in the Natural Sciences (2003)
- Fellow of the Royal Society of Canada (2007)
- Inaugural Distinguished Science Alumni Award-University of Waterloo (2007)
- Premier's Summit Award for Medical Research (2008)
- Fellow of the American Association for the Advancement of Science (AAAS) (2011)
- International Significant Sigma Chi Award (2011)
- Queen Elizabeth II Diamond Jubilee Medal for unique contributions to Canada (2013)
- Distinguished Honorary Affiliate of the Canadian College of Medical Geneticists (2017)
- Clarivate (previously Thomson-Reuters) Citation Laureate in Physiology or Medicine (2014) (2020)
- Maclean's Magazine 50 Most Important People in Canada (2014)
- Killam Prize in Health Sciences (2019)
- Distinguished Fellow of the International Society for Autism Research (2021)
- Debrecen Award for Molecular Medicine (2024)
- Ontario Genomics Luminary Award (2025)
- King Salman International Award for Disability Research (2026)

Scherer holds the Northbridge Chair in Paediatric Research at SickKids and the University of Toronto, and previously held GlaxoSmithKline-CIHR Endowed Chair in Genetics and Genomics from SickKids and the University of Toronto. He also holds Honorary Doctorates from the University of Waterloo (2017), Western University (2018) and the University of Windsor (2001).
