= Michel Robert =

Michel Robert is the name of:

- J. J. Michel Robert (born 1938), Quebec jurist and former Canadian politician
- Michel Robert (equestrian) (born 1948), French show jumping rider
- Michel Robert Roberge

== See also ==
- Robert H. Michel (1923–2017), American politician
