= Ernest Alexander Cruikshank =

Canadian general

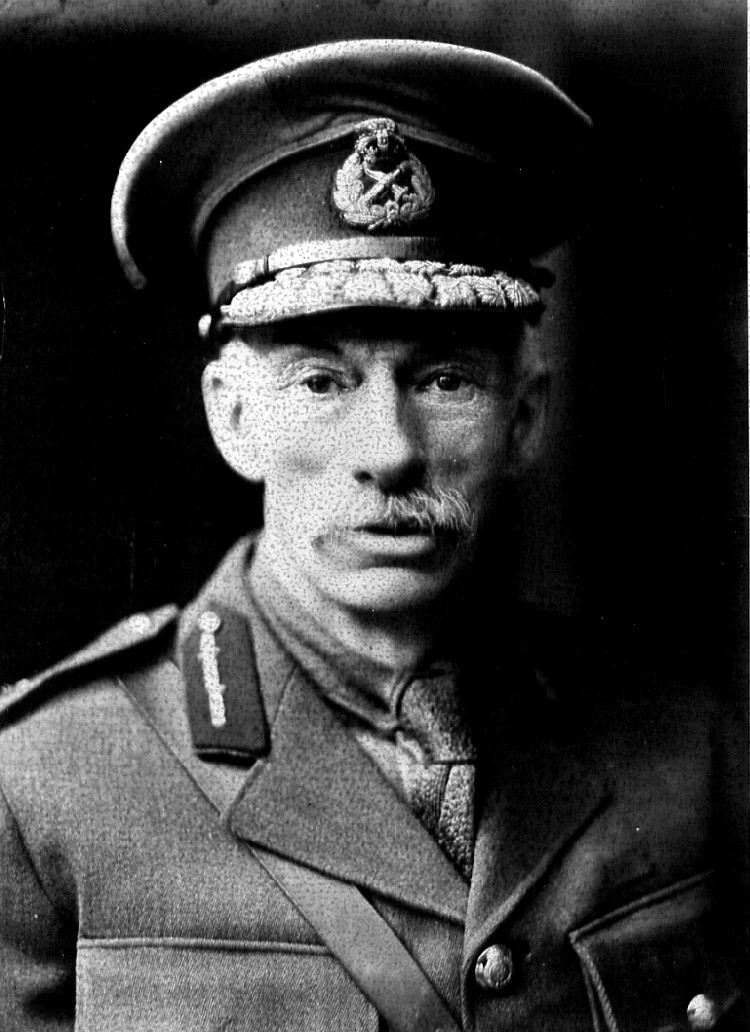
- Born: 29 June 1853; Bertie Township, Canada West
- Died: 23 June 1939 (aged 85) Ottawa, Ontario, Canada
- Allegiance: Canadian
- Service years: 1877 to 1921
- Rank: Brigadier General
- Awards: FRSC
- Other work: Military historian, Chairman of the Historic Sites and Monuments Board of Canada

Ernest Alexander Cruikshank FRSC (29 June 1853 – 23 June 1939) was a Canadian military officer and historian. Specialized in military history, he was the first Chairman of the Historic Sites and Monuments Board of Canada.

== Early life ==
Cruikshank was born in Bertie Township, Canada West in 1853, and was educated at St. Thomas Grammar School and Upper Canada College. He worked as a journalist and translator in the United States, before returning to Canada where he served as Bertie Township's assessor, then its treasurer, then became Reeve of Fort Erie and Warden of Welland County.

In 1879 he married Julia Kennedy of Scranton, Pennsylvania.

== Military career ==
Cruikshank enlisted in the 44th Welland Battalion as an ensign in 1877, becoming Lieutenant Colonel of the regiment in 1899. While serving, he wrote a number of books on the history of Ontario, particularly its military history, and in 1908 he was seconded to the Public Archives of Canada as keeper of military documents. He resigned from the Archives in 1911 to become a Colonel on the permanent staff of the active militia. Rising to the rank of brigadier-general in 1915, he commanded Military District 13, which was headquartered in Calgary, Alberta. In 1917, Cruikshank was assigned to the Western Front in France.

At the end of the First World War, Cruikshank was assigned to Ottawa where he was appointed director of the Historical Section of the General Staff. He retired as a brigadier-general in 1921.

== Historian ==
In 1919, Cruikshank was among the first group of appointees to the Historic Sites and Monuments Board, a new body charged with the task of making recommendations in respect of National Historic Sites of Canada. At the first meeting of the HSMB, Cruikshank was elected Chairman, a role he served until his death in 1939.

Cruikshank was a prolific writer. Among his most notable writings were: The Story of Butler's Rangers and the Settlement of Niagara (1893), A memoir of Colonel the Honourable James Kerby (1931), The Settlement of the United Empire Loyalists on the Upper St. Lawrence and Bay of Quinte in 1784 (1934), The Life of Sir Henry Morgan (1935), The Political Adventures of John Henry: The Record of an International Imbroglio (1936) and the edited volumes of the papers of John Graves Simcoe.

He was a member of the Royal Society of Canada and a President of the Ontario Historical Society. He died at Ottawa.

== Honours ==
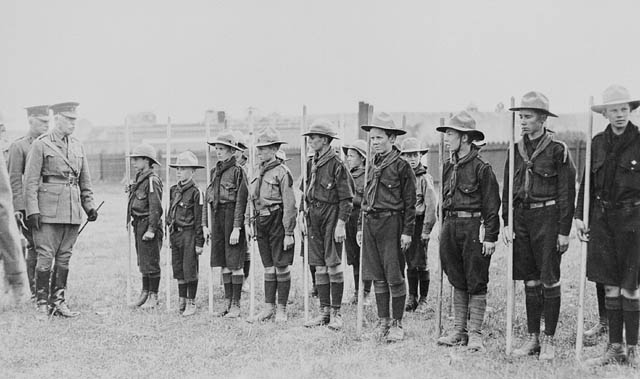
Cruikshank reviewing a troop of Boy Scouts in 1915 in Calgary

He was elected a Fellow of the Royal Society of Canada (F.R.S.C.) in 1905 and was awarded the J. B. Tyrrell Historical Medal for historical research in 1935. Cruikshank is commemorated with a HSMB plaque in the city of Welland, Ontario and an Ontario Heritage Trust plaque in Ottawa. The plaque in Ottawa is located on the grounds of the former Canadian War Museum building and reads: "A noted authority on the history of Ontario, Cruikshank became the first director of the Historical Section of the Adjutant-General's Branch of the General Staff in 1918. From 1919 until his death, he served as the first chairman of the Historic Sites and Monuments Board of Canada."

Cruikshank was named a Person of National Historic Significance in 1943.

== Selected works ==
- Cruikshank, Ernest Alexander (1912). A study of disaffection in Upper Canada in 1812-5. Ottawa : Printed for the Royal Society of Canada.
- —— (1889). The Fight in the Beechwoods. A study in Canadian history. Welland, W.T. Sawle.
- —— (1900). Immigration from the United States into Upper Canada, 1784-1812 - : its character and results. [Toronto] : [Briggs].
- —— (1899). The origin and official history of the Thirteenth Battalion of infantry, and a description of the work of the early militia of the Niagara Peninsula in the War of 1812 and the Rebellion of 1837. Hamilton, Ernest L. Ruddy.
- —— (1898). Blockade of Fort George, 1813. Welland Tribune.
- —— (1900). Drummond's winter campaign, 1813. Ontario, Lundy's Lane Historical Society.
- —— (1888). The battle of Lundy's Lane, 1814. An address delivered before the Lundy's Lane historical society, October 16th, 1888. Ontario, W. T. Sawle, Printer.
- —— (1905). The Siege of Fort Erie August 1st - September 23rd, 1814. Welland Ontario: Printed at the Tribune Office.
- —— (1920). Cruikshank, Ernest Alexander (ed.). Documents relating to the invasion of the Niagara Peninsula by the United States Army, commanded by General Jacob Brown, in July and August, 1814. Niagara Historical Society.
