= Riverside Secondary School =

Riverside Secondary School may refer to:

- Riverside Secondary School (British Columbia), Port Coquitlam, British Columbia
- Riverside Secondary School (Windsor), Windsor, Ontario
- Riverside Secondary School (Singapore)
