= Confederation Life =

Canadian insurance company and financial services provider

Confederation Life Insurance Company
- Type: Public
- Industry: Insurance
- Founded: 14 April 1871
- Founder: John Kay Macdonald
- Defunct: 1994
- Fate: Liquidated
- Headquarters: Toronto, Canada
- Key people: John Kay Macdonald; Charles Strange Macdonald; John Kenneth Macdonald
- Products: Life insurance, investments
- Owner: Macdonald Family

Confederation Life Insurance Company was a Canadian insurance company and financial services provider. Its global head office was located in Toronto in what is now the Rogers Building. The company had operations in Canada, the United States, the United Kingdom, and Bermuda, and an inactive office in Cuba. The company was forced into liquidation in 1994.

== History ==
=== Foundation and growth ===
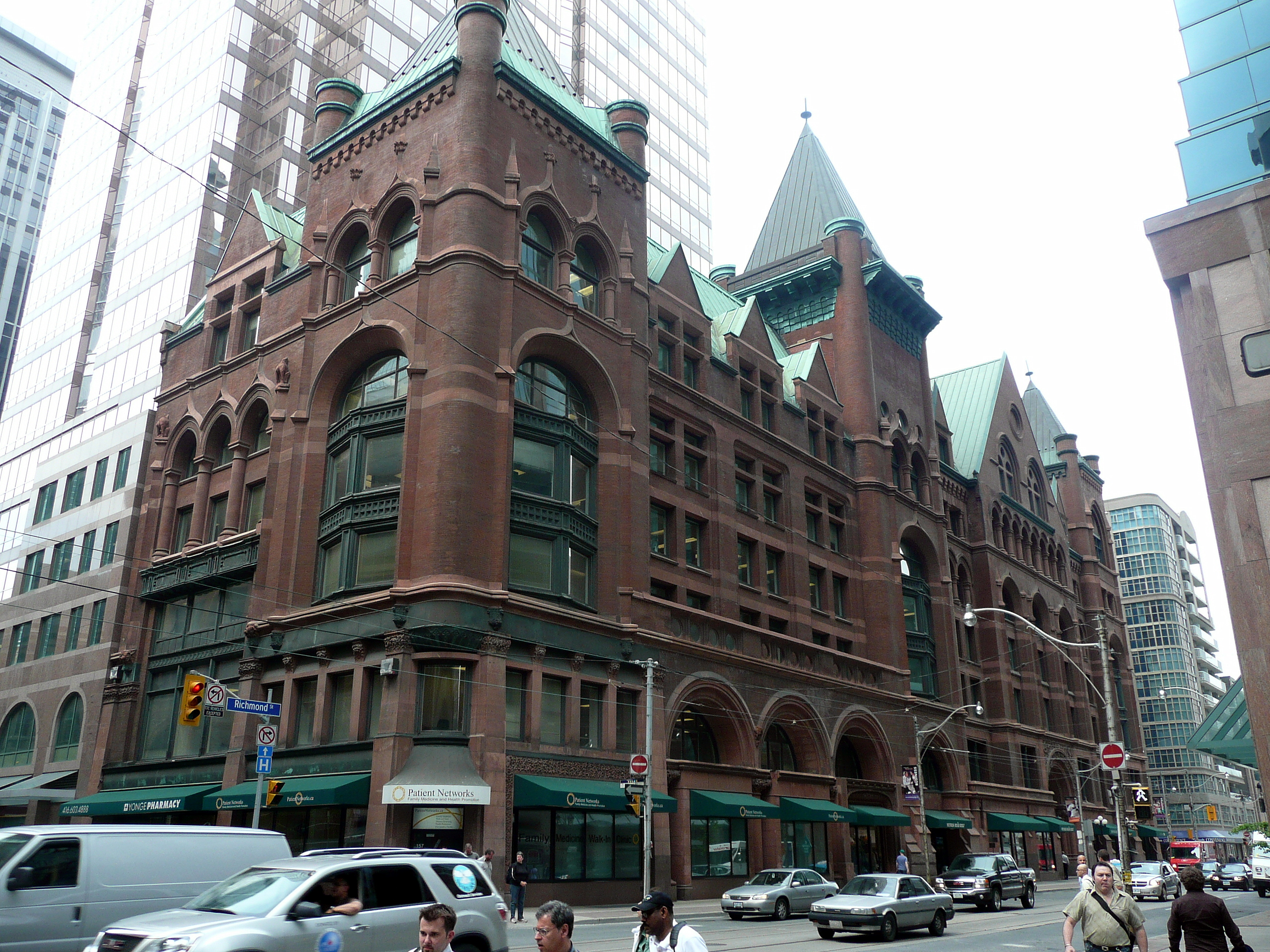
The 1890 head office at 20 Richmond Street East, designed by Knox, Elliot & Jarvis.

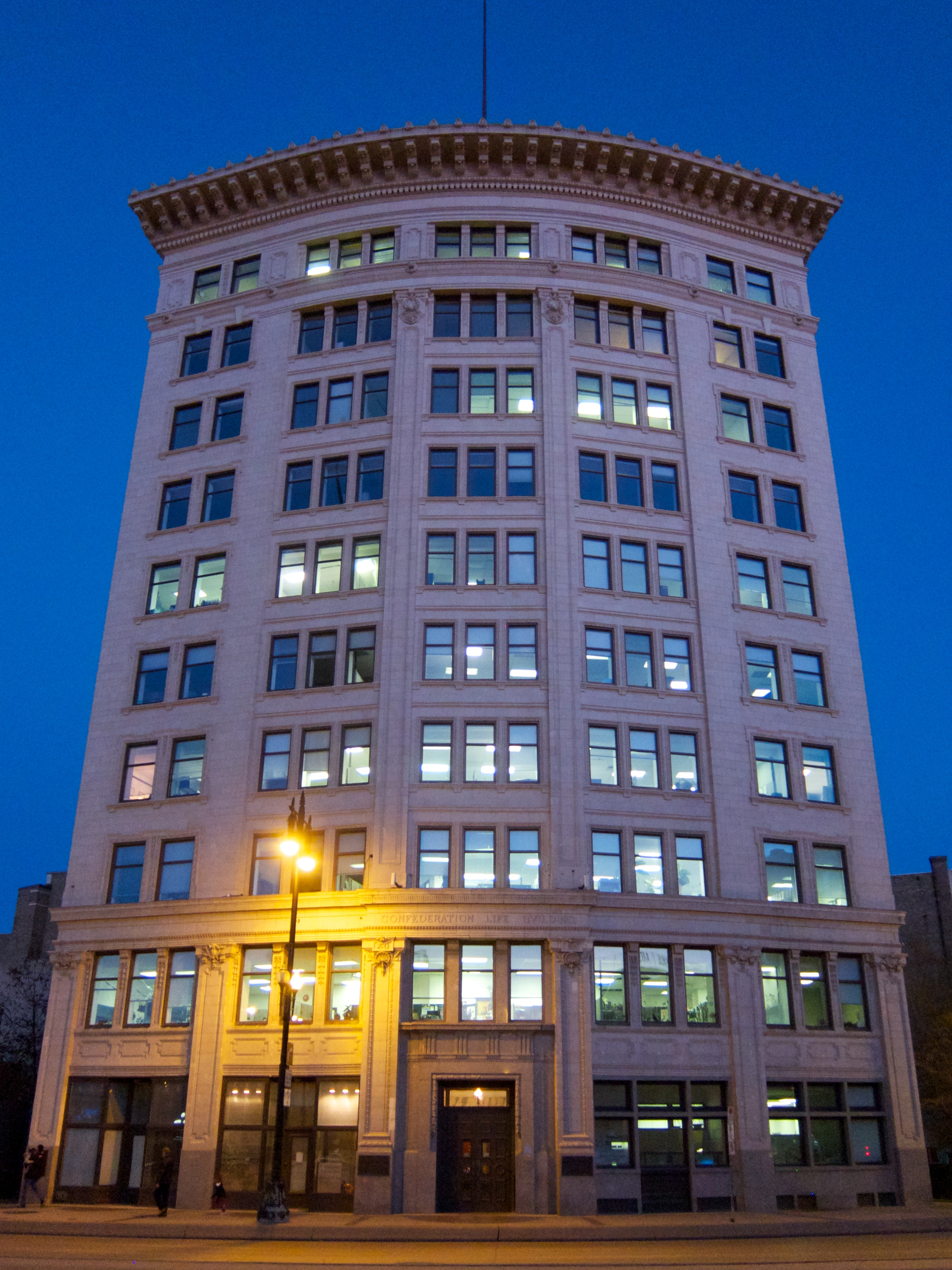
The 1911 Confederation Life Building in Winnipeg, designed by James Wilson Gray.

The company was founded in 1871 by John Kay Macdonald (1837–1928) in Toronto, then established operations in the UK in 1906 (with a head office at Stevenage, Hertfordshire) and later into the United States with offices in Atlanta.

Macdonald retired in 1920 and was succeeded by Charles Strange Macdonald from 1921 to 1946 and then John Kenneth Macdonald from 1946 to 1969. John Kenneth Macdonald's daughters, Peggy Latimer and Ann Macintosh, never were operationally involved in the firm, but they did inherit ownership from their father.

In 1969, J. Craig Davidson became president and for the first time, the firm was no longer led by a member of the Macdonald family.

=== Demise ===
Confederation Life was forced into liquidation in 1994, with the process beginning on August 11. The international operations of the company made the liquidation process somewhat complex.

The company had financial obligations to 260,000 individual policyholders in Canada and to another 1.5 million members of a group insurance plan through the company.

During the liquidation process, CompCorp, by then called Assuris, was able to guarantee the assets of all policyholders, and the process cost the compensation fund only CA$5 million.

The various blocks of business of the company were taken over by various Canadian and American insurance companies. The liquidator was KPMG. As of 2010, the process was still ongoing.

It was the third liquidation of an insurance company in Canada in consecutive years, following Les Coopérants in 1992 and Sovereign Life in 1993. and was followed in 2012 by Union of Canada Life.

== See also ==
- Confederation Life Building
