= E. L. Ruddy & Co =

Canadian outdoor advertising company

E. L. Ruddy & Co was a Canadian outdoor advertising company founded by Ernest L. Ruddy that operated from 1904 to 1973. It was initially known as the Connor-Ruddy Company and later merged into Mediacom and later CBS Outdoor Canada.

In its early years the company made wood signs, but evolved into neon signs after the Second World War, primarily large ones, for major corporations and large retail operations across Canada.

== History ==
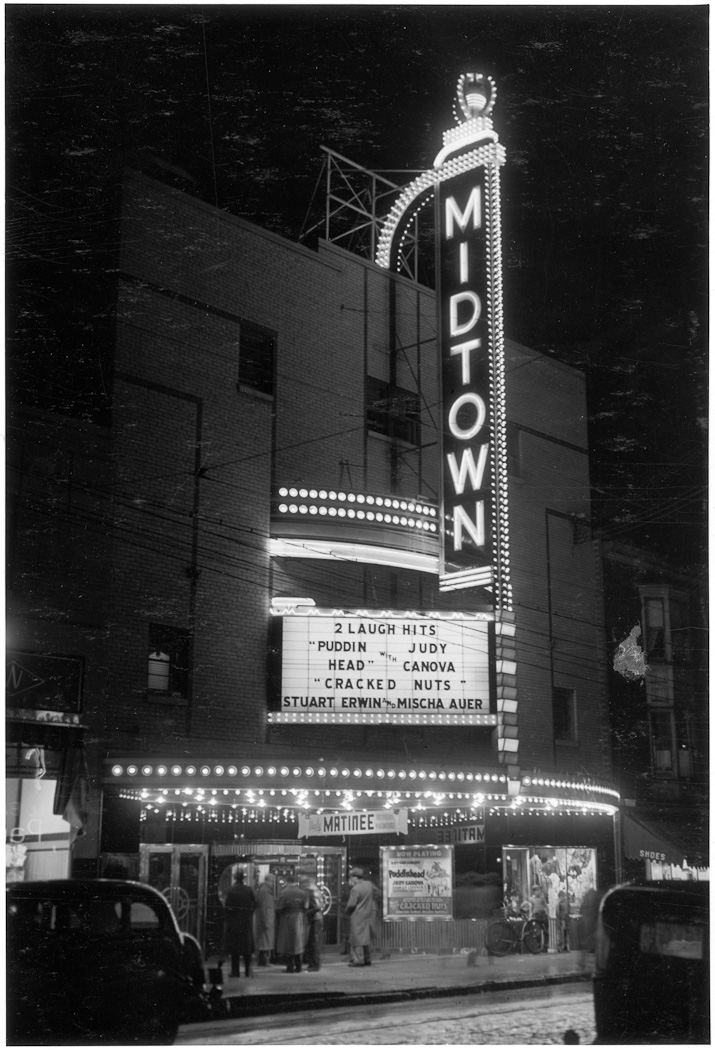
Midtown Theatre lighting by E. L. Ruddy & Co, c. 1941

The Connor-Ruddy Company was founded in 1904 or 1905 by newspaper advertising executive Ernest L. Ruddy. The corporate headquarters were located in the Confederation Life Building on Richmond Street East. Later, Ernest L. Ruddy merged his business with sign-writer Walter Sutton and renamed the company E. L. Ruddy & Co. Sign-writing took place in yard at the intersection of Yonge Street and Church Street. By 1912, the company had expanded operations to Toronto, Hamilton, Winnipeg, Regina, and St. John. The company became more commonly known as E. L. Ruddy & Co starting from around 1912-1913, and moved its headquarters to 371 Spadina Avenue around 1921, where it remained until around 1959. During the 1940's, Ernest L. Ruddy passed the management of the company to John R. Robertson. In the 1960's the Claude Neon division of the company grew and to become Mediacom in 1973, later becoming CBS Outdoor Canada.

== Activities ==
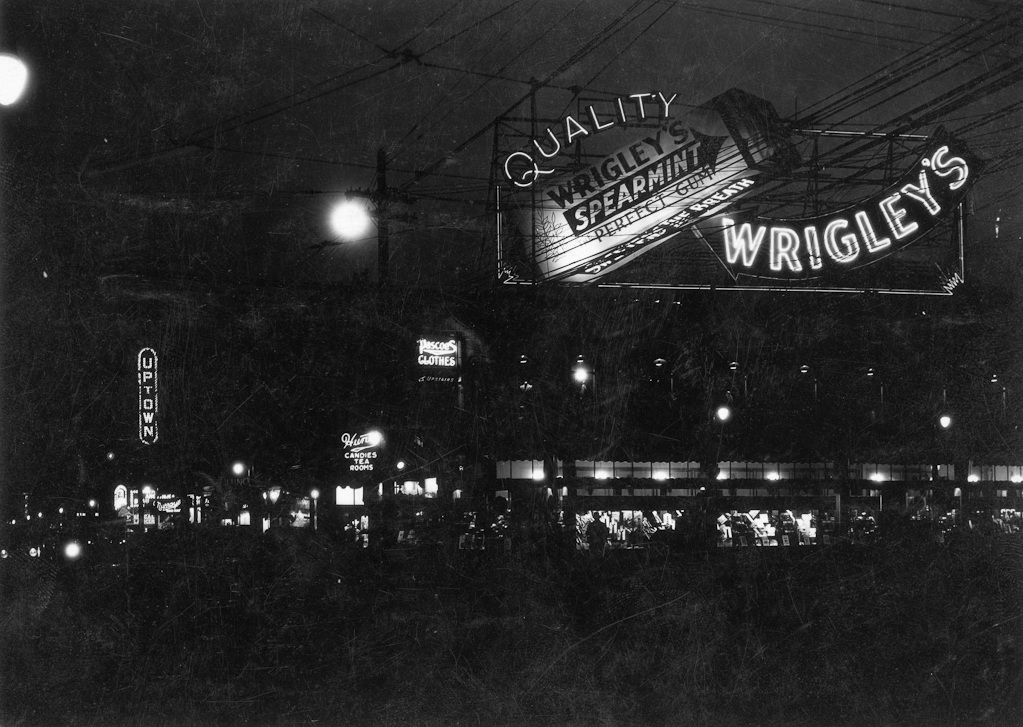
E. L. Ruddy's Wrigley's illuminated advertisement sign, c.1936

At the company's yard, artists painted wooden panels, which were later assembled at the client's location. Later in the 20th century the company started making use of neon and building illuminated signs, including cinema frontages.

Products advertised included Bovril, Old Dutch Cleaner, Tona-Cola, Victory Loan, Dominion Automobile Company, The Whippet (car), Dia corsets, and Wrigleys chewing gum.

== Notable staff ==
- Ernest L. Ruddy
- Robert Hardy Small
