= Province of Quebec (1763–1791) =

British colony of North America

Province of Quebec Province de Québec (French)
- 1763–1791
- Flag
- Anthem: "God Save the King"
- A portion of eastern North America in 1774 after the Quebec Act; Quebec extends all the way to the Mississippi River.
- Status: British colony
- Capital: Quebec
- Common languages: French • English
- Religion: Roman Catholicism, Protestantism
- Government: Constitutional monarchy
- King
  - 1760–1791: George III
- Governor
  - 1764–1766 (first) (Note: As military governor from 1760 to 1764.): James Murray
  - 1766-1778 (Note: First tenure; as governor-in-chief of the Canadas from 1768 to 1778. Acting from 1766 to 1768): Guy Carleton
  - 1778-1786: Sir Frederick Haldimand
  - 1786-1791: Guy Carleton (Note: Second tenure; as governor-in-chief of the Canadas from 1786 to 1791.)
- History
  - Royal Proclamation: 7 October 1763
  - Quebec Act: 22 June 1774
  - Constitutional Act: 26 December 1791
- Currency: Canadian pound
Preceded by
Canada (New France)
Succeeded by
1791: Upper Canada
Lower Canada
1787: Northwest Territory
- Today part of: Canada; United States

The Province of Quebec (French: Province de Québec) was a colony in British North America which comprised the former French colony of Canada. It was established by the Kingdom of Great Britain in 1763, following the conquest of New France by British forces during the Seven Years' War. As part of the 1763 Treaty of Paris, France gave up its claim to the colony; it instead negotiated to keep the small profitable island of Guadeloupe.

Following the Royal Proclamation of 1763, Canada was renamed the Province of Quebec, and from 1774 extended from the coast of Labrador on the Atlantic Ocean, southwest through the Saint Lawrence River Valley to the Great Lakes and beyond to the confluence of the Ohio and Mississippi Rivers in the Illinois Country. Portions of its southwest, those areas south of the Great Lakes, were later ceded to the newly established United States in the 1783 Treaty of Paris at the conclusion of the American Revolution; although the British maintained a military presence there until 1796 and the Jay Treaty. In 1791, the territory north of the Great Lakes was reorganised and divided into Lower Canada and Upper Canada.

== History ==
Under the proclamation, Quebec included the cities of Quebec and Montreal, as well as a zone surrounding them, but did not extend as far west as the Great Lakes or as far north as Rupert's Land.

In 1774, the Parliament of Great Britain passed the Quebec Act that allowed Quebec to restore the use of French customary law (Coutume de Paris) in private matters alongside the English common law system, and allowing the Catholic Church to collect tithes. The act also enlarged the boundaries of Quebec to include the Ohio Country and part of the Illinois Country, from the Appalachian Mountains on the east, south to the Ohio River, west to the Mississippi River and north to the southern boundary of lands owned by the Hudson's Bay Company, or Rupert's Land.

Western District was one of four districts of the Province of Quebec created in 1788 in the western reaches of the Montreal District, which were later detached in 1791 to create the new colony of Upper Canada. Known as Hesse District (named after Hesse in Germany) until 1792.

Through Quebec, the British Crown retained access to the Ohio and Illinois Countries after the Treaty of Paris (1783) ceded control of this land to the United States. By well-established trade and military routes across the Great Lakes, the British continued to supply not only their troops but also the Western Confederacy (a wide alliance of indigenous nations) through Detroit, Fort Niagara, Fort Michilimackinac, and so on, until these posts were turned over to the United States following the Jay Treaty (1794).

Quebec retained its seigneurial system after the conquest. Owing to an influx of Loyalist refugees from the American Revolutionary War, the demographics of Quebec came to shift and now included a substantial English-speaking Protestant element from the former Thirteen Colonies. These United Empire Loyalists settled mainly in the Eastern Townships, Montreal, and what was known then as the Pays d'en Haut west of the Ottawa River. The Constitutional Act 1791 divided the colony in two at the Ottawa River, so that the western part (Upper Canada) could be under the English legal system, with English speakers in the majority. The eastern part was named Lower Canada.

== Governors ==
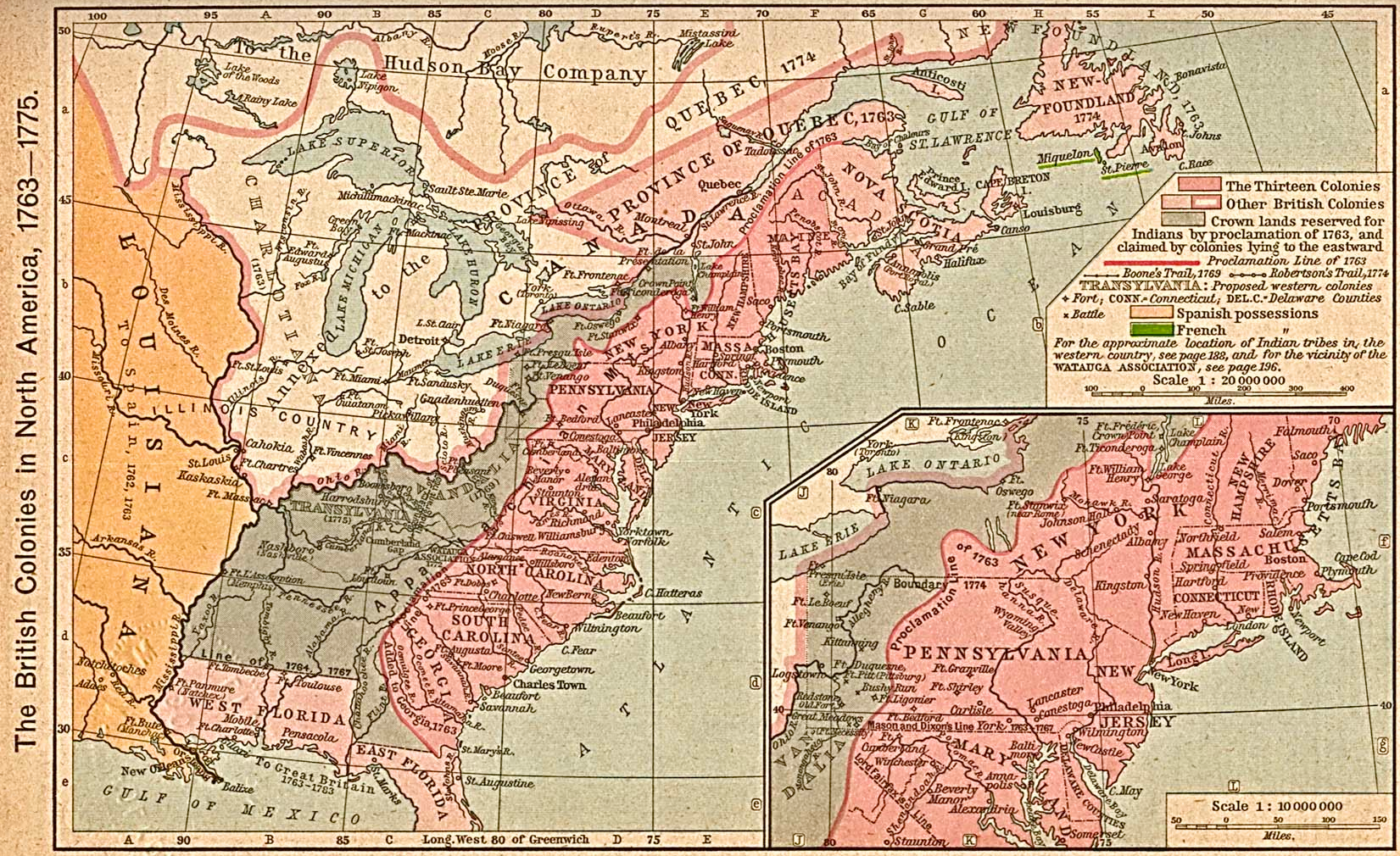
Map of British America showing the original boundaries of the Province of Quebec, and its Quebec Act 1774 post-annexation boundaries

In 1760, following the capitulation of Montreal, the colony was placed under military government, with civil government only instituted beginning in 1764. The following were the governors:

- James Murray 1760–1766
- Guy Carleton, 1st Baron Dorchester 1766–1778
- Sir Frederick Haldimand 1778–1786
- Guy Carleton, 1st Baron Dorchester 1786–1796

There were also "lieutenant governors", but these were merely the deputies of the governors, and should not be confused with the subsequent to 1791 Lieutenant-Governor of Quebec.

- Guy Carleton (lieutenant governor to James Murray) 1766–1768
- Hector Theophilus de Cramahé (lieutenant governor to Guy Carleton) 1771–1782
- Henry Hamilton (lieutenant governor to Frederick Haldimand) 1782–1785
- Henry Hope (lieutenant governor to the Lord Dorchester) 1785–1788
- Alured Clarke (lieutenant governor to the Lord Dorchester) 1790

== Counsellors to the governor ==
The Province of Quebec did not have an elected legislature and was ruled directly by the governor with advice from counsellors. A council responsible to advise the governor (then James Murray) on all affairs of state was created in 1764. The Quebec Act 1774 created a Council for the Affairs of the Province of Quebec to advise the governor on legislative affairs. The Legislative Council served as an advisory council to the governor until a legislative assembly was established after 1791.

The individuals James Murray called into the council from 1764 to 1766:

Member	Appointment	Notes
Chief Justice William Gregory	1764	served until 1766
Chief Justice William Hey (1733–1797)	1764	Chief Justice of Quebec 1766–1773
Attorney General George Suckling (1759–178?)	1764	lawyer; served until 1766; most of his career was in the West Indies
Lieutenant Paulus Aemilius Irving (1714–1796)	1764	served until 1768; acting President of the Council 1766–1768; commander-in-Chief of British Forces in Quebec and administrator 1766–1768
Hector Theophilus de Cramahé (1720–1788)	1764	served until 1766 Lieutenant Governor of Quebec 1771–1782; later member of the Legislative Council
Adam Mabane (1734–1792)	1764	served until 1766; British Army physician and judge; later member of the Legislative Council 1775–1792
Walter Murray (1701?–1772)	1764	served until 1771; relative to then Governor Murray; British Army officer under James Wolfe; head of the Port of Quebec and justice of the peace and Receiver General
Captain Samuel Holland (1728–1801)	1764	served until 1770?; British Army officer and served as first Surveyor General of British North America
Thomas Dunn (1729–1818)	1764	served until 1774; colonial administrator and soldier; merchant; master in the Court of Chancery 1764; later member of the Legislative Council
François Mounier (?–1769)	1764	served until 1769; Huguenot merchant, justice of the peace; examiner in the Court of Chancery and judge of the Court of Common Pleas 1764–1769
Captain James Cuthbert Sr. (1719–1798)	1766	served until 1774; army officer (15th Regiment of Foot), merchant, justice of the peace; Seigneur of Berthier
Benjamin Price (?–1768 or 1769)	1764	served until 1768; merchant, justice of the peace, master in the Court of Chancery 1764–1768

List of councillors under Carleton from 1766 to 1774:

Member	Appointment	Notes
Chief Justice William Hey	1766	appointed during Murray's term as Governor; Chief Justice of Quebec 1766–1773
Attorney General Francis Maseres (1731–1824)	1766	served until 1769; lawyer, office holder, and author
Lieutenant Paulus Aemilius Irving (1714–1796)	1764	appointed during Murray's term as governor and till 1768; acting President of the Council 1766–1768; commander-in-chief of British Forces in Quebec and administrator 1766–1768
Hector Theophilus de Cramahé (1720–1788)	1764	appointed during Murray's term as governor and served until 1771; Lieutenant Governor of Quebec 1771–1782; later member of the Legislative Council
Adam Mabane (1734–1792)	1764	appointed during Murray's term as governor and served until 1766; British Army physician and judge; later member of the Legislative Council 1775–1792
Walter Murray (1701?–1772)	1764	appointed during Murray's term as governor and served until 1771; relative to then Governor Murray; British Army officer under James Wolfe; head of the Port of Quebec and justice of the peace and Receiver General
Captain Samuel Holland (1728–1801)	1764	appointed during Murray's term as governor and served until 1770; British Army officer and served as first Surveyor General of British North America
Thomas Dunn (1729–1818)	1764	appointed during Murray's term as governor and until 1774; colonial administrator and soldier; merchant; master in the Court of Chancery 1764; later member of the Legislative Council
François Mounier	1764	appointed during Murray's term as governor and served until 1769; Huguenot merchant, justice of the peace; examiner in the Court of Chancery and judge of the Court of Common Pleas 1764–1769
Captain James Cuthbert Sr. (1719–1798)	1766	appointed during Murray's term as governor and served until 1774; army officer (15th Regiment of Foot), merchant, justice of the peace; Seigneur of Berthier
Benjamin Price (?–1768 or 1769)	1764	appointed during Murray's term as governor and served until 1768; merchant, justice of the peace, master in the Court of Chancery 1764–1768

== Geography ==
Around 1763 to 1764, the province was divided into two judicial districts:

- Montreal District – covering the western parts of Quebec along the St. Lawrence River including Montreal and much of Ontario (Eastern and Southern Ontario)
- Quebec District – covering the eastern parts of Quebec along the St. Lawrence and Labrador

In 1790, the Trois-Rivières District was formed out of part of Quebec District.

The Trois-Rivières and Quebec districts continued after 1791 when Lower Canada came into existence, while Montreal District west of the Ottawa River became Upper Canada and east of the Ottawa River was partitioned into many electoral districts.

== See also ==
- Former colonies and territories in Canada
- Territorial evolution of Canada after 1867
