= Npj Genomic Medicine =

npj Genomic Medicine
- Discipline: Genomics
- Language: English
- Edited by: Stephen W. Scherer

Publication details
- History: 2016–present
- Publisher: Springer Nature
- Impact factor: 7.355 (2021)

Standard abbreviations
- ISO 4: npj Genom. Med.

Indexing
- ISSN: 2056-7944

Links
- Journal homepage; Online archive

npj Genomic Medicine is a peer-reviewed scientific journal that publishes papers on various aspects of genomics and its application in medicine.

The journal was founded in 2016 and is published by Springer Nature.

== Editorial process and journal scope ==
npj Genomic Medicine is an open-access that publishes articles on the medicinal aspects of genomics. Published papers including topics such as integrative phenotype, data mining and artificial intelligence, new technologies and informatics, etc.

Journal publishes various types of genres such as research articles, brief communications, comments, editorials, reviews, etc.

As of 2022 editors-in-Chief is Stephen W. Scherer from The Hospital for Sick Children and the University of Toronto McLaughlin Centre.

== Abstracting and indexing ==
The journal is abstracted and indexed for example in:

- SCOPUS
- Journal Citation Reports
- Google Scholar
- DOAJ

According to the Journal Citation Reports, the journal has a 2021 impact factor of 7.355.
