= Ogilvy Renault =

Canadian law firm (1879–2011)

Ogilvy Renault LLP
- Type: Limited Liability Partnership
- Industry: Law Firm
- Founded: 1879
- Headquarters: Montreal, Quebec
- Products: Legal advice

Ogilvy Renault LLP was a Canadian law firm with 450 members in offices in Montreal, Ottawa, Quebec, Toronto, Calgary and London, England. Ogilvy Renault offered services in business law, litigation and ADR, employment and labour law and intellectual property. Ogilvy Renault offered services in both English and French and in civil and common law.

== History ==
The firm began in 1879 as Carter, Church & Chapleau in Quebec. In 2001, the firm merged with Meighen Demers LLP of Toronto.

On November 15, 2010, Ogilvy Renault announced it was joining the British firm of Norton Rose. The merger was completed on June 1, 2011, and the resulting firm, Norton Rose Fulbright, was one of the 10 largest law firms in the world.

== Alumni ==
- Joseph-Adolphe Chapleau, former Quebec Conservative premier
- Adrien D. Pouliot, former Quebec Conservative Party leader
- Brian Mulroney, former Prime Minister of Canada
- Yves Fortier, former Canadian ambassador to the United Nations
- Michael Meighen, former Conservative senator
- Michael Fortier, former Conservative senator and Minister of International Trade
- Pierre Michaud, former Chief Justice of Quebec
- Michael Bryant, former Ontario Attorney-General and Liberal MPP
- Jacques Demers, former President & CEO of OMERS Strategic Investments

== See also ==
- Goodman and Carr
