= J. J. Michel Robert =

Canadian politician (1938–2025)

The Honourable J. J. Michel Robert PC OC KC

Chief Justice of Quebec
- In office 2002–2011
- Preceded by: Pierre Michaud
- Succeeded by: Nicole Duval Hesler

President of the Liberal Party of Canada
- In office 1986–1990
- Preceded by: Iona Campagnolo
- Succeeded by: Don Johnston

Personal details
- Born: January 29, 1938 Montreal, Quebec, Canada
- Died: November 18, 2025 (aged 87) Montreal, Quebec, Canada

J. J. Michel Robert PC OC KC (January 29, 1938 – November 18, 2025) was a Canadian jurist and politician.

== Life and career ==
Robert served as president of the Young Liberals of Canada from 1963 to 1965. In that role he was the first person to propose a formal accountability mechanism for the party leadership. At a 1964 meeting of the national council of the Liberal Party of Canada that approved holding party convention every two year, Robert moved for a proposal to submit the party leader to a vote of confidence at the party convention after every general election. The proposal was defeated after cabinet minister Hazen Argue and Alberta party leader Harper Prowse spoke strongly against it.

He was a member of the 1982 to 1985 Royal Commission on the Economic Union and Development Prospects for Canada (Macdonald Commission) headed by Donald Stovel Macdonald. From 1986 to 1990, he was president of the Liberal Party of Canada. In 1991, he was appointed to the Queen's Privy Council for Canada when Prime Minister Brian Mulroney appointed him to the Security Intelligence Review Committee.

Robert's legal career began with his admission to the Bar of Quebec in 1962. He was senior partner in the firm of Robert Dansereau, Barred, Marchessault and Lauzon, Montreal from 1968 to 1990 and in private practice with Langlois Robert from 1990 to 1995.

In 1995, he was appointed a puisne justice on the Quebec Court of Appeal, and became chief justice in 2002. He retired in 2011.

In 2013, he was made an Officer of the Order of Canada "for his achievements in the field of law as a lawyer and jurist, and for his commitment to advancing his profession".

Robert died on November 18, 2025, at the age of 87.
