= Marcel Crête =

Chief Justice of Quebec

Marcel Crête (May 31, 1915 – March 11, 1988) was a Canadian lawyer and judge. He served as Chief Justice of Quebec from 1980 until his death in office in 1988.
