= Claude Bisson =

Canadian jurist

- Born: May 9, 1931; Trois-Rivières, Quebec, Canada
- Died: March 18, 2024 (aged 92)
- Awards: Order of Canada

Claude Bisson, OC (May 9, 1931 – March 18, 2024) was a Canadian jurist. Bisson was a judge of the Quebec Court of Appeal and a former Communications Security Establishment Commissioner.

Bisson was born in Trois-Rivières on May 9, 1931. He studied at the Seminary of Trois-Rivières and studied law at both Laval University and McGill University. He is married to Louisette Lanneville, and they have two sons and a daughter. He practised law in Trois-Rivières after being called to the bar in 1954. He was a Crown Attorney from 1964 to 1966. He was active in the Canadian Bar Association, the Junior Chamber of Commerce, and the Board of Trade, in various capacities.

Bisson served on three boards of inquiry; the 1969 inquiry examining multiple escapes from St. Vincent-de-Paul Penitentiary (sole Commissioner); the 1975 inquiry under the Explosives Act into an explosion at a factory in McMasterville, Quebec (sole Commissioner); and from 1984 to 1987, the Canadian Sentencing Commission (member and vice-president).

In 1998, he was made an Officer of the Order of Canada "for his tremendous humanity and his tireless efforts to ensure the orderly administration of justice". Bisson retired as a judge of the Quebec Court of Appeal in May 1996. He was appointed a Superior Court Judge for the district of Montreal in 1969, and was appointed to the Court of Appeal on May 1, 1980. In 1988 he was sworn in as Chief Justice of the Quebec Court of Appeal, and became Chief Justice of Quebec. He received the Plaque of Honour from the Bar of the Province of Quebec in 1994, and was appointed an Officer of the Order of Canada in January 1999.

On June 19, 1996, Bisson was first named Communications Security Establishment (CSE) Commissioner. His mandate was to review the activities of CSE, Canada's national cryptologic agency, for the purpose of determining whether they are in compliance with the laws of Canada. His appointment was extended for a further three years on June 8, 1999.

Bisson died on March 18, 2024, at the age of 92.
