= Genetic Non-Discrimination Act =

Act of the Parliament of Canada

Parliament of Canada
- Long title: An Act to prohibit and prevent genetic discrimination
- Citation: SC 2017, c. 3
- Considered by: Senate of Canada
- Passed: 14 April 2016
- Considered by: House of Commons of Canada
- Passed: 8 March 2017
- Royal assent: 4 May 2017

Legislative history

First chamber: Senate of Canada
- Bill citation: Bill S-201, 42nd Parliament, 1st Session
- Introduced by: Jim Cowan
- First reading: 8 December 2015
- Second reading: 27 January 2016
- Third reading: 14 April 2016

Second chamber: House of Commons of Canada
- First reading: 3 May 2016
- Second reading: 26 October 2016
- Third reading: 8 March 2017
- Status: In force

The Genetic Non-Discrimination Act (French: Loi sur la non-discrimination génétique) of 2017, also known as Bill S-201 during the 2nd Session of the 41st Parliament of Canada and the 1st Session of the 42nd Parliament of Canada, originated in a Private Member's Bill. It was introduced by Senators James Cowan and Jennifer O'Connell. The Act was designed to prevent genetic discrimination which might "come in the form of unfair insurance practices, being passed over for a promotion, and even being fired. Unfortunately, there are a number of documented cases of genetic discrimination in Canada."

== History ==
Senators James Cowan and Jennifer O'Connell introduced the Genetic Non-Discrimination Act (Bill S-201) as a private member's bill during the 2nd Session of the 41st Parliament, and again in December 2015 during the 1st Session of the 42nd Parliament. The Act was intended to prevent genetic discrimination in unfair insurance and employment practices.

The Senate passed Bill S-201 in April 2016. Later that year, Minister of Justice and Attorney General Jody Wilson-Raybould stated that the proposed legislation was likely ultra vires Parliament's criminal law power under section 91(27) of the Constitution Act, 1867, citing the Supreme Court's decision in Reference re Assisted Human Reproduction Act. She indicated that the government could not support the bill.

The Senate pass Bill S-201 in April 2016. In late 2016, Minister of Justice and Attorney General Jody Wilson-Raybould noted that the legislation was likely ultra vires of Parliament's constitutional criminal law power citing the Supreme Court's decision in Reference re Assisted Human Reproduction Act, and that the government could not support Bill S-201. This statement opened a question on whether the Attorney General had a duty to defend a law passed by Parliament that they did not believe was lawful.

Despite the government's opposition, the House of Commons passed Bill S-201 on March 8, 2017, in a free vote, with support from Liberal backbenchers and opposition parties.

== Content and interpretation ==
The Genetic Non-Discrimination Act defined a "genetic test" as "a test that analyzes DNA, RNA or chromosomes for purposes such as the prediction of disease or vertical transmission risks, or monitoring, diagnosis or prognosis." (Note: Genetic Non-Discrimination Act, S.C. 2017, c. 3, s. 2) It established three main prohibitions: first, requiring an individual to undergo a genetic test as a condition for providing goods or services or for entering into a contract; second, requiring an individual to disclose the results of a genetic test as such a condition; and third, disclosing the results of a genetic test without the individual's written consent. (Note: Genetic Non-Discrimination Act, S.C. 2017, c. 3, s. 3–5)

A breach of any of these prohibitions constituted a hybrid offence. Upon summary conviction, an person was liable to a fine of up to $300,000, imprisonment for up to twelve months, or both. Upon conviction on indictment, the maximum penalty increased to a fine of up to $1 million, imprisonment for up to five years, or both. (Note: Genetic Non-Discrimination Act, S.C. 2017, c. 3, s. 7)

The Act also included exceptions for health care practitioners and related circumstances, such as where the use or disclosure of genetic information was necessary for medical care or research. (Note: Genetic Non-Discrimination Act, S.C. 2017, c. 3, s. 6)

== In the media ==
The Globe and Mail published an opinion piece upon passage of the Act in 2017 by their in-house healthcare analyst André Picard in which he said the "Anti-genetic-discrimination bill is little more than virtue signalling".

== In the Supreme Court ==
In 2018, the government of Quebec referred the legislation to the Quebec Court of Appeal, which unanimously held that the Act was ultra vires Parliament's jurisdiction over criminal law under section 91(27) of the Constitution Act, 1867. (Note: In the matter of the: Reference of the Government of Quebec concerning the constitutionality of the Genetic Non-Discrimination Act enacted by Sections 1 to 7 of the Act to prohibit and prevent genetic discrimination, 2018 QCCA 2193 at para 27, Court of Appeal (Quebec, Canada)) The Attorney General of Canada declined to defend the legislation's constitutionality, so the Court appointed Douglas Mitchell as amicus curiae.

In 2020, a 5–4 plurality of the Supreme Court of Canada held the Genetic Non-Discrimination Act was a valid exercise of Parliament's criminal law power of section 91(27) of the Constitution Act, 1867. (Note: Reference re Genetic Non‑Discrimination Act, 2020 SCC 17, Supreme Court (Canada)) The majority found that the Act's pith and substance was the protection of individuals' control over their genetic information in a broad number of circumstances; and that Parliament may legislate in response to a credible threat of harm to public interests traditionally protected by criminal law, without requiring proof of actual harm, but a "apprehension of harm." The dissent held the statute regulated contracts and the provision of goods and services with the objective of promoting the health of Canadians, and therefore fell under the provincial head of power under section 92(13) of the Constitution Act, 1867. Additionally, the dissent adopted a narrower view, concluding that speculative risks were insufficient to ground a valid criminal law purpose.
