= Jean-François-Joseph Duval =

Canadian politician

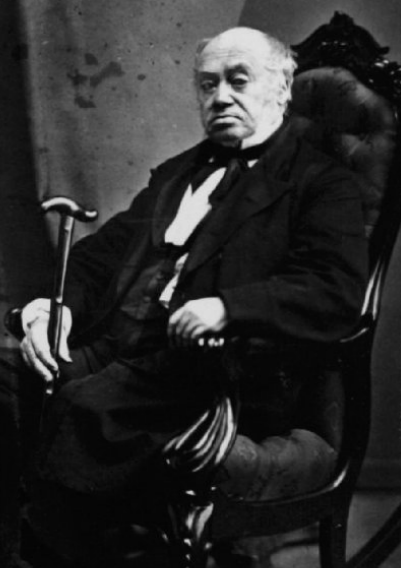

Chief Justice of Quebec
- In office 1864–1874
- Preceded by: Louis-Hippolyte Lafontaine
- Succeeded by: Antoine-Aimé Dorion

Personal details
- Born: July 17, 1802 Quebec City, Lower Canada
- Died: May 6, 1881 (aged 78) Quebec City, Quebec

Jean-François-Joseph Duval, QC (July 17, 1802 – May 6, 1881) was a lawyer, judge and political figure in Quebec. He represented Quebec Upper Town in the Legislative Assembly of Lower Canada from 1829 to 1834.

He was born in Quebec City, the son of François Duval and Ann Eliza Germain. Duval was educated at the Petit Séminaire de Québec, studied law with George Vanfelson and then Joseph-Rémi Vallières de Saint-Réal, and was admitted to the bar in 1823, entering practice with Vallières de Saint-Réal. He was named King's Counsel in 1835. He was first elected to the provincial assembly in an 1829 by-election held after his associate Vallières de Saint-Réal was named a judge. Duval voted against the Ninety-Two Resolutions. In 1839, he was named assistant judge in the Court of King's Bench following the suspension of Elzéar Bédard and Philippe Panet. Duval married Adélaïde Dubuc in 1849. In 1852, he was named judge in the Quebec Superior Court and, in 1855, in the Court of Queen's Bench. In 1864, he was named Chief Justice in the Court of Queen's Bench, serving until 1874.

As Chief Justice, Duval oversaw the judicial crisis in Quebec. In December 1873, the members of the Montreal Bar passed a resolution stating the administration of justice at the Court of Queen's Bench was "inefficient, unsatisfactory and destructive" to public confidence, and they called for a Royal Commission to investigate the court's state of affairs. By March 1874, the court could no longer reach a quorum, as one judge had resigned and two others were on leave. Duval subsequently resigned in June 1874.

Duval died at Quebec at the age of 79.
