= Centre for Applied Genomics =

Genomics centre in Toronto, Canada

The Centre for Applied Genomics
- Type: Genome Centre
- Founded: 1998
- Headquarters: Toronto, Canada
- Area served: Biomedical research
- Key people: Stephen W. Scherer, scientific director
- Services: Experimentation, project consultation, data analysis, bioinformatics
- Number of employees: 70
- Parent: The Hospital for Sick Children
- Website: http://www.tcag.ca/

The Centre for Applied Genomics is a genome centre in the Research Institute of The Hospital for Sick Children, and is affiliated with the University of Toronto. TCAG also operates as a Science and Technology Innovation Centre of Genome Canada, with an emphasis on next-generation sequencing (NGS) and bioinformatics support. Research at TCAG focuses on the genetic and genomic basis of human variability, health and disease, including research on the genetics of autism spectrum disorder and structural variation of the human genome. The centre is located in the Peter Gilgan Centre for Research and Learning in downtown Toronto, Canada.

== History ==
The need for a centralized core facility for human genome research at SickKids Hospital prompted the establishment of The Centre for Applied Genomics (TCAG) in 1998. The founding director and associate director were Drs. Lap-Chee Tsui and Stephen W. Scherer, respectively. Scherer is now the scientific director.

The Centre for Applied Genomics – MaRS location

Funding from the Canada Foundation for Innovation (CFI) enabled TCAG to form by consolidating existing core facilities including the Medical Research Council of Canada Genome Resource Facility, the Canadian Genetic Diseases Network (CGDN) large insert clone core, the CGDN DNA Sequencing Core and the SickKids Biotechnology Service DNA Sequencing and Synthesis labs. A genome-wide microsatellite genotyping laboratory at the Ottawa Health Research Institute, led by Dennis Bulman, was added. Subsequently, operational funding from the CIHR Genomics Special Projects panel provided for additional staff.

In 2001, a proposal entitled "Genome Resource Core Platform" was submitted to the then newly formed Genome Canada. This provided operational support, enhancing existing facilities and adding a mouse genotyping core at the University of Toronto led by Lucy Osborne. In 2002, SickKids built a new Affymetrix microarray facility. This core has quickly grown to become the largest such service centre in Canada and is in the top ten in North America.

In 2004, TCAG entered a second phase of development driven by a $12 million CFI/Ontario Innovation Trust funded project entitled "Integrative Genomics for Health Research", allowing for consolidation of the mouse genotyping core with the SickKids facilities. This award also supported the establishment of an "Ontario Population Genomics Repository" (OPGP) to be used as controls in studies of common diseases. To efficiently complete this project, TCAG partnered with John McLaughlin's group at Mount Sinai Hospital (Toronto).

In May, 2004, an application to the newly announced CFI Research Hospital Fund resulted in a $10.9 million award to build out lab space and consolidate all operations on the 14th and 15th floors of the Toronto Medical Discovery Tower (TMDT) in the MaRS Discovery District. TCAG was the first occupant of TMDT (in August, 2005), quickly followed by other SickKids scientists. Investments in computer infrastructure from the 2003 CFI/Ontario Innovation Trust competition resulted in the establishment of new phases of the high-performance computing cluster (HPF) that is currently used by TCAG and many other users, to allow analysis of large genomic datasets arising from new microarray and sequencing technologies. Further enhancements to the TCAG infrastructure were supported by a $10.7 million renewal grant from CFI's Leading Edge Fund competition, entitled "Integrative Genomics for Health Research – Phase II", awarded in June 2009. More recently, a CFI grant entitled "The Centre for Applied Genomics: Paediatric Genomes to Outcomes" provided further infrastructure support. In October 2013, TCAG moved to the Peter Gilgan Centre for Research and Learning, a new building housing the SickKids Research Institute.

TCAG operates in large part on Science and Technology Innovation Centre (STIC) funds from Genome Canada, administered by the Ontario Genomics Institute.

== Research ==
Current research at TCAG centres around large-scale projects performed by facility personnel, including support of Genome Canada projects, and a significant focus on the genetics of autism spectrum disorders and structural variation of the human genome. Service work is also performed for over 600 other academic, private sector and government labs each year, drawn from 30 different countries and spanning a wide variety of research disciplines.

Past research at TCAG is reflected by numerous peer-reviewed scientific publications. In 2008, TCAG Scientific Directors, Associate Scientists and staff co-authored 58 peer-reviewed manuscripts dependent in some way (either entirely, or in part) on the platform infrastructure, as documented in PubMed. Since 2002, over 270 such papers have been published. Support of other researchers worldwide is found in many similar publications, with at least 145 papers in scholarly journals, book chapters, or graduate thesis dissertations acknowledging support or use of database resources during 2008 alone.

Historical papers include:

- Discovery of genes involved in predisposition to medulloblastoma (Michael Taylor and James Rutka with TCAG support)
- Gene identification in Shwachman-Diamond syndrome (with Johanna Rommens and others)
- Gene identification in Lafora Epilepsy (with Berge Minassian) and its canine counterpart
- A disease-relevant MECP2 isoform involved in Rett syndrome
- Involvement of the SUMO4 gene in type I diabetes
- Severe expressive-language delay related to duplication of the Williams–Beuren locus

TCAG was also integral to publications describing the decoding of human chromosome 7, the discovery of large-scale copy number variation in the human genome, and the analysis of the first diploid human genome sequence (with the J. Craig Venter Institute).

=== Genome Canada projects ===
As a Science and Technology Innovation Centre of Genome Canada, TCAG currently supports numerous large-scale projects, including research on autism spectrum disorders, structural variation of the human genome, integrative biology, conditional mouse mutagenesis, interactions of signaling molecules, type I diabetes, cancer stem cells, Cystic Fibrosis, biodiversity, structural biology, and stem cells, from Genome Canada's Competition III, New Technology Development and Applied Genomics Research in Bioproducts or Crops (ABC) competitions. The centre is now working with applicants in the Large-Scale Applied Research Project and Advancing Technology Innovation Through Discovery competitions.

=== Databases ===
TCAG also hosts and curates websites and databases developed from supported projects, namely The Chromosome 7 Database, The Database of Genomic Variants, the Segmental Duplication Database, the Autism Chromosome Rearrangement Database, and others. These databases contain publicly available information.

== Core facilities ==
TCAG DNA Synthesis Facility

TCAG employs a variety of genomic technologies to support different types of experimentation. These are organized into separate Core Facilities, with dedicated managers.

=== Informatics and biostatistics ===
The Bioinformatics team assists with data handling and analysis, and develops new algorithms and analytical methods, with a focus on the analysis of high-throughput ("next-generation") sequencing data. The Statistical Analysis group provides project consultation and power analysis, statistical analysis (genetic, microarray, and pathway data, epidemiology, population genetics), and copy number variation analysis, as well as developing new statistical methods.

=== DNA sequencing and synthesis ===
The facility uses conventional capillary Sanger sequencing on Applied Biosystems 3730xl instruments, governed by a Laboratory Information Management System (LIMS). Additionally, next-generation sequencing (NGS) using Illumina HiSeq 2500 and HiScan SQ instruments, Life Technologies Ion Proton and Applied Biosystems SOLiD instruments, and a 454/Roche GS-FLX Titanium instrument is performed. A key component of this facility is the use of high-performance computing and bioinformatics support for NGS analysis.

The oligonucleotide synthesis component of this facility makes conventional, long (up to 120 bases) and modified oligonucleotides, and purifies these by desalting, cartridge or high-performance liquid chromatography (HPLC).

=== Microarray and genetic analysis ===
The Microarray and Gene Expression Core Facility has a dedicated manager, and operates technologies from Affymetrix, Agilent and Illumina. Additionally, there is a wide variety of analytical software packages available for on-site data analysis.

=== Cytogenomics and genome resources ===
The Cytogenomics and Genome Resources Core Facility has a single manager between these two functions. Cytogenomics includes karyotyping and spectral (SKY) karyotyping (for mouse, human, and other species), fluorescent in situ hybridization (FISH) mapping, transgenic insertion site mapping (G-to-FISH mapping) and clone labeling for FISH experiments. The Genome Resources components includes a clone repository (Mammalian Gene Collection (MGC) cDNA (mouse and human), genomic clones including human bacterial artificial chromosomes (BACs)) and provides project consultation and design assistance (annotation, database queries, probe selection). It also provides cDNA library screening and quantitative PCR.

=== Genetic analysis ===
The Genetic Analysis area includes capillary-based genotyping (Applied Biosystems TaqMan and SNaPshot, microsatellites), custom genotyping (e.g. heteroduplex analysis), mouse genotyping (for cross progeny and genetic linkage analysis), and methylation analysis (for epigenetics research).

=== Biobanking ===
The Biobanking Core Facility has its own dedicated manager. It performs white cell immortalization (from blood) and banking, fibroblast culture and banking, culture and banking of other cell types including non-human cells, genomic DNA preparation from blood, saliva, tissues or cells, and whole-genome amplification (WGA).

== Funding sources ==
TCAG is funded by several agencies, including the Canada Foundation for Innovation (CFI), Genome Canada through the Ontario Genomics Institute, the Ontario Ministry of Research and Innovation. Additionally, philanthropic donations are administered by The Hospital for Sick Children Foundation, and specific research projects are funded by a wide variety of agencies and charitable foundations.

== Organization and management ==
=== Scientific director ===
The scientific director of TCAG is Stephen W. Scherer, senior staff scientist in The Hospital for Sick Children's Research Institute, director of the McLaughlin Centre, and a professor at the University of Toronto.

=== Scientific management committee ===
TCAG is governed by a scientific management committee, who meet regularly to discuss high-level strategic planning. The scientific management committee consists of:

- Gary Bader
- Michael Brudno
- Christian Marshall
- Andrew Paterson
- Adam Shlien
- Lisa Strug
- Martin Somerville
- Michael Wilson
- Ryan Yuen

Bader and Brudno are located at the University of Toronto, and the others at The Hospital for Sick Children. The committee also includes three ex officio members: the assistant director, facility manager, and a representative from the Ontario Genomics Institute.

=== Associate investigators ===
Since 2006, TCAG has appointed associate investigators. These associates consult on their specific areas of expertise, and assist in identification and implementation of new technologies. At present, there are nineteen associate investigators: Drs. Moumita Barua (U of Toronto), Jonathan Beauchamp (U of Toronto), Sarah Bowdin (Ted Rogers Centre for Heart Research), Jennifer Brooks (U of Toronto), Brendan Frey (U of Toronto), Ann George (SickKids), Zhenya Ivakine (SickKids), Pingzhao Hu (U of Manitoba), Melanie Mahtani (Prime Genomics), Daniele Merico (Deep Genomics), Esteban Parra (UTM), Mary Shago (SickKids), Mark Silverberg (MSH), James Stavropoulos (SickKids), Michael Taylor (SickKids), Mohammad Uddin (Mohammad Bin Rashid University), John Vincent (CAMH), Suzi Walker (Genomics England), and Marc Woodbury-Smith (Newcastle University).

=== Scientific advisory board ===
High-level scientific oversight of TCAG's scientific mandate and operations is provided through an external scientific advisory board (SAB). The SAB members are:

- Edward M. Rubin (Chair), Metabiota
- Mark Blaxter, Tree of Life Programme, Wellcome Sanger Institute
- Elaine Mardis, Institute for Genomic Medicine, Nationwide Children's Hospital
- Gabor Marth, University of Utah
- Roderick McInnes, Lady Davis Research Institute, Jewish General Hospital
- Richard Myers, HudsonAlpha Institute for Biotechnology

The Ontario Genomics Institute (OGI) and Genome Canada also provide ex officio members.
