= Jean-Baptiste-Gustave Lamothe =

Canadian judge and lawyer

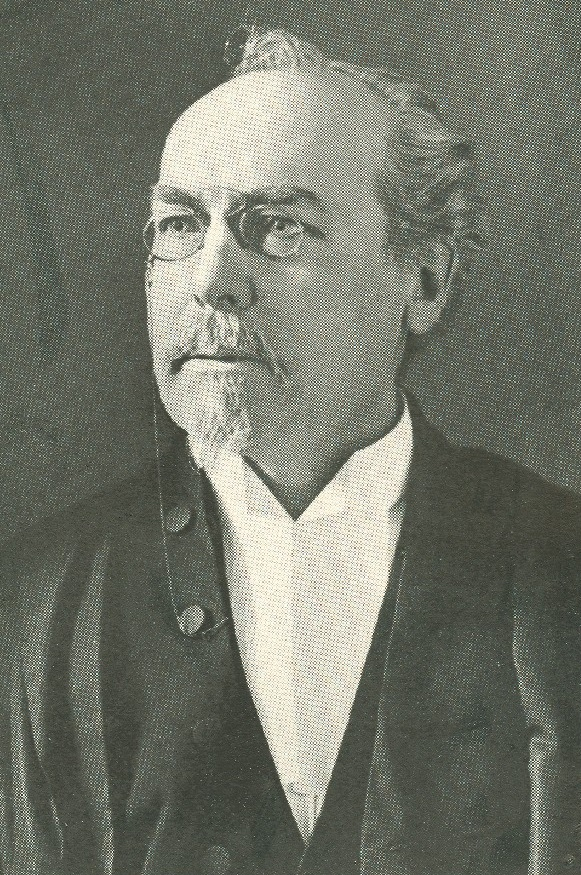

Jean-Baptiste-Gustave Lamothe (April 16, 1856 – November 24, 1922) was a Canadian judge and lawyer. He was the Chief Justice of Quebec between 1918 and 1922.

== Life and career ==
Lamothe was born in Champlain, Canada East, the son ofJoseph-Germain Lamothe and of Émilie Turcotte.

He studied the cours classique at the Séminaire Saint-Joseph de Trois-Rivières, and Law with François-Xavier-Anselme Trudel in Montreal. He was called to the Quebec bar in 1880. He was appointed Queen's Counsel in 1899. He was awarded a doctorate in Law by the Université de Montréal in 1921. He practiced with Trudel and with Napoléon Charbonneau. He was bâtonnier of the district of Montreal between 1904 and 1905. Involved with the Parti conservateur du Québec, he was vice president of the Association libérale-conservatrice de Montréal. He was the director of the Ligue anti-alcoolique in 1909.

He was appointed a judge of the Quebec Superior Court on September 25, 1915. He was appointed to the Quebec Court of Queen's Bench and made Chief Justice of Quebec on September 19, 1918. On October 16, 1918, he served for a few days as Administrator of Quebec because of health problems of Pierre-Évariste Leblanc, the Lieutenant Governor of Quebec. He died in Montreal.

== Sources ==
- Les juges en chef de la province de Québec, 1764-1924 / Audet, Francis-Joseph, p. 171
