= Chief Justice of Quebec =

The title of Chief Justice of Quebec (French: Juge en chef du Québec) is assumed by the chief justice of the Court of Appeal of Quebec. From 1849 to 1974 it was assumed by the chief justice from the Court of Queen's Bench or Court of King's Bench.

== Chief Justice of the Province of Quebec (1763-1791) ==
Name	Portrait	Start	End
William Gregory		1764	1766
William Hey		3 February 1766	27 September 1774
Peter Livius		August 1776	1786
William Smith		2 November 1786	1791

== Chief Justice of Lower Canada (1791-1841) ==
Name	Portrait	Start	End
William Smith		1791	6 December 1793 (Died in office)
William Osgoode		24 February 1794	1 May 1802
John Elmsley		29 October 1802	29 April 1805
Henry Allcock		1 July 1805	22 February 1808 (Died in office at Québec)
Jonathan Sewell		22 August 1808	1838
Sir James Stuart		22 October 1838	1841

== Chief Justice of Canada East (1841-1867) ==
Name	Portrait	Start	End
Sir James Stuart		1841	1853
Sir Louis-Hippolyte Lafontaine		13 August 1853	1864
Jean-François-Joseph Duval		March 1864	1867

== Chief Justice of Quebec (since 1867) ==
Name	Portrait	Start	End
Jean-François-Joseph Duval		1867	1874
Sir Antoine-Aimé Dorion		1 June 1874	31 May 1891
Sir Alexandre Lacoste		14 September 1891	24 January 1907
Sir Henri-Thomas Taschereau		29 January 1907	11 November 1909
Sir Louis-Amable Jetté		16 November 1909	10 August 1911
Sir Horace Archambeault		10 August 1911	25 August 1918
Jean-Baptiste-Gustave Lamothe		19 September 1918	24 November 1922
Eugène Lafontaine		22 December 1922	19 September 1932
Sir Joseph-Mathias Tellier		21 September 1932	31 December 1942
Séverin Létourneau		9 January 1943	17 December 1949
Antonin Galipeault		18 January 1950	1 March 1961
Lucien Tremblay		1 March 1961	1 July 1977
Édouard Rinfret		10 August 1977	12 May 1980
Marcel Crête		12 May 1980	11 May 1988
Claude Bisson		24 May 1988	31 October 1994
Pierre A. Michaud		1 November 1994	20 June 2002
Michel Robert		25 June 2002	30 August 2011
Nicole Duval Hesler		7 October 2011	8 April 2020
Manon Savard		11 June 2020	
