= Assuris =

- Formation: 1990; 36 years ago
- Headquarters: Toronto
- Website: assuris.ca
- Formerly called: CompCorp (1990-2005)

Assuris is a nonprofit organization under Canadian federal regulation to protect policyholders of life insurance instruments if a life insurance company becomes insolvent. It is designed to allow a block of policies to be transferred to a solvent company in which the policies will continue to be honoured (similar to the Canada Deposit Insurance Corporation for deposit accounts). The Office of the Superintendent of Financial Institutions states, "Assuris' mission is to mitigate the impact on Canadian policyholders of the financial failure of a life insurance company."

Every life insurer that is authorized to sell policies in Canada is required by the various provincial, territorial, and federal regulators to become a member of Assuris. Founded in 1990 as CompCorp, it was renamed to Assuris in 2005.

Policies are protected as follows:

- monthly income, health expense, death benefits, and cash values policyholders receive at least 85% of their promised benefits.
- However, 100% protection is provided by Assuris for amounts below the following cash values: monthly income policies up to $5,000, health expenses policies up to $250,000, death benefits on policies up to $1,000,000, and cash values up to $100,000.

The last insurer to have its policies guaranteed by Assuris was Union of Canada Life.

== See also ==
- Canadian Life and Health Insurance Association
