= Manon Savard =

Canadian jurist

Manon Savard is a Canadian jurist who has been Chief Justice of the Quebec Court of Appeal since June 2020.

== Early life and education ==
Savard, daughter of Marc Savard and Suzanne Primeau, is from Montreal. She attended the Collège Jean-de-Brébeuf, finishing high school in 1979. In 1982, she graduated with a Bachelor of Business Administration from McGill University and in 1985 with a Bachelor of Laws from the Faculty of Law at the University of Montreal.

== Career ==
Savard was admitted to the Bar of Quebec in 1986 and worked at law firm Ogilvy Renault (now Norton Rose Fulbright) from 1986 until 2009. Her expertise is in employment and labour law, human rights and administrative law. Savard has taught at the Bar of Quebec and advised the Quebec Minister of Labour on legislative issues.

On 29 July 2009, Savard was appointed to the Quebec Superior Court, becoming a member of the Civil Procedure Rules Committee and overseeing the court's Student Interns Committee. Savard was appointed to the Court of Appeal on 25 April 2013.

On 11 June 2020, Prime Minister Justin Trudeau announced Savard's appointment as Chief Justice of Quebec. She became the second woman in the role, after Nicole Duval Hesler, whom she replaced.

== Personal life ==
Savard is married to Daniel Jutras, rector of the Université de Montréal.
