= Peter Livius =

Chief Justice of Quebec

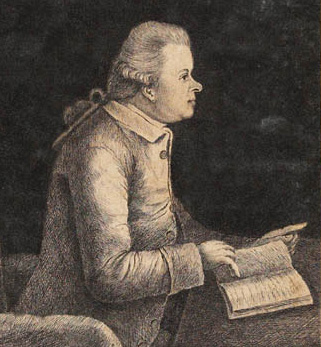

Chief Justice of Lower Canada
- In office 1776–1786
- Preceded by: William Hey
- Succeeded by: William Smith

Personal details
- Born: July 12, 1739 Lisbon, Portugal
- Died: July 23, 1795 (aged 56) Brighton, England
- Profession: Attorney

Peter Livius (12 July 1739 – 23 July 1795) was a Portuguese-born lawyer who became the Chief Justice of Quebec.

He was born in Lisbon, Portugal, the sixth child of Peter Livius, a German from Hamburg and was sent to school in England by his English mother. He married well and in 1763 moved to the Province of New Hampshire, where his wife's family owned land.

In 1764 he made a large gift of books to Harvard University and in return was given an honorary master's degree. In 1765 he became a member of the New Hampshire council and in 1768 was appointed a Judge of the Court of Common Pleas. He was removed from the bench in 1772 for partiality and returned to England on an unsuccessful mission to fight his case.

He decided to stay on in England to improve his credentials and reputation. In 1773 a gift of elk horns to the Royal Society got him elected as a Fellow. He entered the Middle Temple to study law and was called to the bar in 1775, also receiving an honorary DCL from Oxford University. He then managed to secure the position of judge of the Court of Common Pleas and judge of the Court of Vice-Admiralty in Montreal. He arrived in Quebec just prior to the American siege of the town in 1775 and was rewarded for his defensive activities in August 1776 with the post of Chief Justice of Quebec and an ex-officio place on the Council. However, a secret letter from Livius to the enemy commander was intercepted and resulted in Livius being deprived of his estates. After further clashes with Governor Guy Carleton he was dismissed from his post by the Governor in 1778.

Again he fled to London to plead his case, successfully this time, but his return to Quebec in 1780 was thwarted by adverse sailing conditions. He was finally relieved of his position as Chief Justice in 1786, without ever having attempted a second time to return to Quebec. He lived thereafter on a pension.

He died in 1795 on a trip to Brighton. He had married Anna Elizabeth, the daughter of Colonel John Tufton Mason.
