= Riverside Secondary School (Windsor, Ontario) =

Location
- 8465 Jerome Street; Windsor, Ontario, N8S 1W8; Canada; 42.331°N 82.936°W

Information
- School type: High School
- Founded: 1956
- School board: Greater Essex County District School Board
- Superintendent: Josh Canty
- Principal: Dina Salinitri
- Vice Principal: Hiba Yacoub
- Senior Secretary: Donna MacDougall
- Grades: 9 through 12
- Enrolment: 835 (2018)
- Language: English
- Area: Riverside
- Colours: Black and Gold
- Team name: Stingers
- Website: www.publicboard.ca/en/riverside/index.aspx

Riverside Secondary School (RSS) is a public high school that offers programs and classes for grades 9 to 12 in the community of Riverside, in the east end of Windsor, Ontario, Canada. In 2018, RSS became an IB World School authorized to offer the Diploma Programme. In 2024, following the suspension of the Programme in all Windsor public high schools, RSS began to phase it out.

== Associated Public Schools ==
RSS is the secondary school that serves the following public elementary schools:

- Dr. David Suzuki Public School
- Eastview Horizon Public School
- Forest Glade Public School
- M.S. Hetherington Public School
- Parkview Public School
- Princess Elizabeth Public School

These are collectively referred to as Riverside Community Schools.

== Facility ==
Located at 8465 Jerome Street, Windsor Ontario, Canada, Riverside Secondary School is located in East Windsor.

The original Riverside High School was located on Ontario Street between Esdras and Glidden. The building was previously Edith Cavell Elementary School, consisting of 3 floors of classrooms, the lowest floor housing the boys and girls dressing rooms, a shop room, and a stairway that led to a subterranean quaint but homey gymnasium with a cement floor. The partially grassed football field and cinder track were 2 blocks away on Ontario at Jefferson. The principal was Bob Walton and many of its staff went on to teach in the newly built RHS, including Sam Krewench, Miss Margaret Westgate, Mr. O'Gorman, Mr Sabo, Miss Trottier, Mr Byng, Mr Roy Giroux, Mr Giles, Mr Gorski, and Ms Stahl, and Mr. Wilkinson. The construction of Riverside Secondary School was completed in 1963 with additions in 1965 and 1971. A new track and football field were built in 2017.

== School Mascot and the 'Johnny Rebel' Controversy ==
In 2021, in response to criticism from students, the school announced it would rename its mascot, 'Johnny Rebel', a cartoon ghost figure wearing the hat of a civil war soldier and carrying a Confederate flag, to 'Captain Rebel.'.

In response to further criticism, on February 2, 2022, the Greater Essex Country District School Board announced the discontinuation of the 'Rebel' name from the High School mascot altogether. In a statement:

"The GECDSB is committed to dismantling anti-Indigenous and anti-Black racism and to creating safe, caring, and inclusive learning environments for all students,” said the statement. “In keeping with this commitment, the GECDSB is ethically and legally compelled to immediately and completely remove the team name, Rebels, from Riverside Secondary School (“RSS”) and to immediately discontinue the use of its mascot ‘Captain Rebel.’”

The report was found to be flawed, particularly regarding a misinterpretation of the feathered quill on the school's crest. The report had also been prepared without consulting the Riverside Secondary School community and its trustees. Two GECDSB Trustees requested a formal apology from senior administration over the way the report had been handled.

In July 2022, RSS announced that their teams would be named the 'Stingers', rather than 'Rebels'.

== Notable alumni ==
- Ted Bulley, former NHL hockey player
- Dave Cooke, former Ontario MPP and Cabinet minister
- Ron Friest, former NHL hockey player
- Cam Janssen, NHL hockey player
- Ed Jovanovski, NHL hockey player 1st overall pick of the 1994 NHL Draft
- Steven Langlois (Étienne), musician
- Bill McKenzie, former NHL hockey player
- Bob Parent, NHL hockey player
- Dr. Stephen W. Scherer, scientist
- Ryan Wilson, NHL hockey player

== See also ==
- Education in Ontario
- List of secondary schools in Ontario
