= Nicole Duval Hesler =

The Honourable Nicole Duval Hesler

Chief Justice of Quebec
- In office October 7, 2011 – April 8, 2020
- Preceded by: J. J. Michel Robert
- Succeeded by: Manon Savard

Personal details
- Born: April 8, 1945 (age 81) Quebec City, Quebec

Nicole Duval Hesler (born April 8, 1945) is the first woman chief justice of Quebec. She obtained a Bachelor of Arts from Marianopolis College in 1964. Duval Hesler was admitted to the Quebec Bar in 1968, appointed to the Superior Court of Quebec in 1992 and appointed to the Court of Appeal of Quebec in 2006. On October 7, 2011, Prime Minister Stephen Harper named Duval Hesler the chief justice of the Court of Appeal.

Hesler retired on April 8, 2020.
