= Canadian Life and Health Insurance Association =

Canadian trade association

- Association canadienne des compagnies d'assurances de personnes
- Formation: May 5, 1894; 132 years ago
- Founded at: Toronto, Ontario
- Type: Not-for-profit corporation
- Purpose: Trade association
- Members: 64 companies (2020)
- President & CEO: Stephen Frank
- Affiliations: Global Federation of Insurance Associations
- Website: clhia.ca
- Formerly called: Canadian Life Managers Association (1894–1901); Canadian Life Insurance Officers Association (1901–65); Canadian Life Insurance Association (1965–81)

The Canadian Life and Health Insurance Association Inc. (CLHIA; French: Association canadienne des compagnies d'assurances de personnes) is a voluntary trade organization representing life insurance and health insurance providers in Canada. The organization was formed as the Canadian Life Managers Association by executives representing eight Canadian life insurance companies on May 5, 1894, and was incorporated in 1901 as the Canadian Life Insurance Officers Association.

The association is a member of the Global Federation of Insurance Associations whose member associations represent insurers that account for about 87 per cent of total insurance premiums worldwide.

== Leadership ==
Since 2007, Frank Swedlove has been serving as the association's president while the current chair of the board (2014–2015) is Donald Guloien, president and chief executive officer of Manulife Financial Corporation.

== Recent activities ==
In May 2010, Ontario Member of Provincial Parliament (MPP) Jeff Leal introduced a private member's bill based on the CLHIA's proposals for insurance reform. This bill was strongly opposed by the New Democratic Party of Ontario, whose leader Andrea Horwath argued that it would favour insurance companies at the expense of consumers.

== See also ==
- Assuris
- Office of the Superintendent of Financial Institutions
