= Pierre Michaud =

Canadian lawyer and judge (1936–2023)

The Honourable Pierre A. Michaud OC OQ KC AdE
- Born: April 17, 1936; Port-Alfred, Quebec, Canada
- Died: March 17, 2023 (aged 86)
- Known for: Chief Justice of Quebec

Pierre A. Michaud OC OQ KC AdE (April 17, 1936 – March 17, 2023) was a Canadian lawyer and judge. Michaud was Chief Justice of Quebec from 1994 to 2002.

Born in Port-Alfred, Quebec, he received a law degree from the Université de Montréal in 1960. He was called to the Quebec Bar in 1961, and appointed Queen's Counsel in 1976.

From 1961 to 1983, he was a trial attorney with a law firm in Montreal. In 1983, he was made a Judge of Quebec Superior Court. In 1992, he became an Associated Chief Justice of Quebec Superior Court and in 1994 he was appointed the Chief Justice of Quebec Court of Appeal and Chief Justice of Quebec.

In 2002, Michaud retired as Chief Justice of Quebec and joined the law firm Ogilvy Renault as counsel. Among other appointments, he was a member of the Quebec National and International Commercial Arbitration Centre, the ADR Chambers International Panel and the Arbitration Commission of the International Chamber of Commerce. Michaud was also Chair of the Hearing Committee, Investment Industry Regulatory Organization of Canada, previously known as Investment Dealers Association of Canada, Quebec District. In 2017, he was counsel at Norton Rose Fulbright.

Michaud died on March 17, 2023, at the age of 86.

== Honours ==
Michaud was appointed a Member of the Order of Canada (CM) in 2002, and was promoted to Officer (OC) in 2003.

The Québec Bar awarded Michaud its Médaille du Barreau du Québec in 2008.

In 2015, he was appointed an Officier of the Ordre National du Québec (OQ).
