= William Hey (judge) =

British lawyer and Chief Justice of Quebec

Member of Parliament for Sandwich
- In office 1774–1776

Chief Justice of Quebec
- In office 1766–1774
- Preceded by: William Gregory
- Succeeded by: Peter Livius

Personal details
- Born: 1733 England
- Died: 1797 (aged 63–64) London, England
- Occupation: Jurist
- Profession: Attorney

William Hey (c. 1733–1797) was a British lawyer who became Chief Justice of Quebec in 1766 and helped formulate the legal system for the province. He sat in the British House of Commons from 1774 to 1776.

== Early life ==
Hey was the son of Thomas Hey (c1710-?), formerly a merchant of Venice, and his wife Elizabeth Markham, widow of Sir Thomas Palmer, 4th Baronet, of Wingham. He was educated at Eton College in 1748 and was admitted at Corpus Christi College, Cambridge in 1750. He was admitted at Middle Temple in 1750 and was called to the bar in 1756. From 1763 to 1766 he was Recorder of Sandwich and deputy recorder of Dover.

== Chief Justice ==
At the beginning of 1766 the attorney-general, Charles Yorke, recommended Hey for Chief Justice of Quebec and he was appointed on 3 February 1766. On 5 June he married Jane Faunce (1744–1772) daughter of Thomas Faunce (1705–1797) and Jane Faunce née Barrell (1705–1759). They left Plymouth in June and reached Quebec in September together with Francis Maseres the newly appointed attorney general for the province. He became quickly involved with urgent legal cases and was faced with the task of creating a legal system that was acceptable to all communities. The major issue was how and to what extent the French and English legal systems should be integrated. In 1769 the views of Hay, Maseres and the Governor Guy Carleton were relayed back to London. Carelton was in favour of a combination of English criminal law and French civil law.

In 1773 Hey sought leave to return to London on the grounds of ill-health and arrived at the beginning of 1774. He helped Alexander Wedderburn, attorney-general in the final preparation of the Quebec Bill but when he examined regarding it in the House of Commons on 2 June he professed limited knowledge of the bill and was unable or unwilling to form an opinion on it. The Bill was primarily based on Carleton's recommendations.

== Parliamentary career ==
In September 1774 Hey was nominated as Member of Parliament for Sandwich at the 1774 general election and expected to be returned unopposed on the government interest. On 27 September, he submitted his resignation as Chief Justice to Lord Dartmouth. He believed he could not hold both positions, but his personal feelings were expressed two years later when he referred to his time in Quebec as “ten years of honest, however imperfect, endeavours to serve the Crown in an unpleasant and something critical situation”. He was duly returned as MP for Sandwich in October. Dartmouth refused to accept his resignation and sent him back to Quebec while keeping his seat in Parliament. However he did not intend to stay there for long and at the time of the American invasion in summer 1775 wrote on the prospects in Quebec “as gloomy ... in point of security and in the ill humours and evil dispositions of its inhabitants ... as can be imagined”. He returned to England in November 1775 and in February 1776 made his only speech in Parliament defending the Quebec Act and praising Carleton.

In October 1776 Hey was appointed Commissioner of Customs and held the post until his death. It was said at the time of his election that it was understood that he was to leave his Quebec post soon after, and be given some office. He resigned his seat in Parliament when taking the post on 31 October 1776.

== Later life ==
Hey married secondly Sarah Paplay (1758–?) daughter of George Paplay (?-1769) and Sarah Paplay née Lawrence (1727–?) of Jamaica on 5 April 1783 in Westminster.. He died on 3 March 1797.

Parliament of Great Britain
Preceded by (Sir) Philip Stephens; The Viscount Conyngham	Member of Parliament for Sandwich; 1774–1776; With: (Sir) Philip Stephens	Succeeded by (Sir) Philip Stephens; Charles Brett
