= Confederation Life Building =

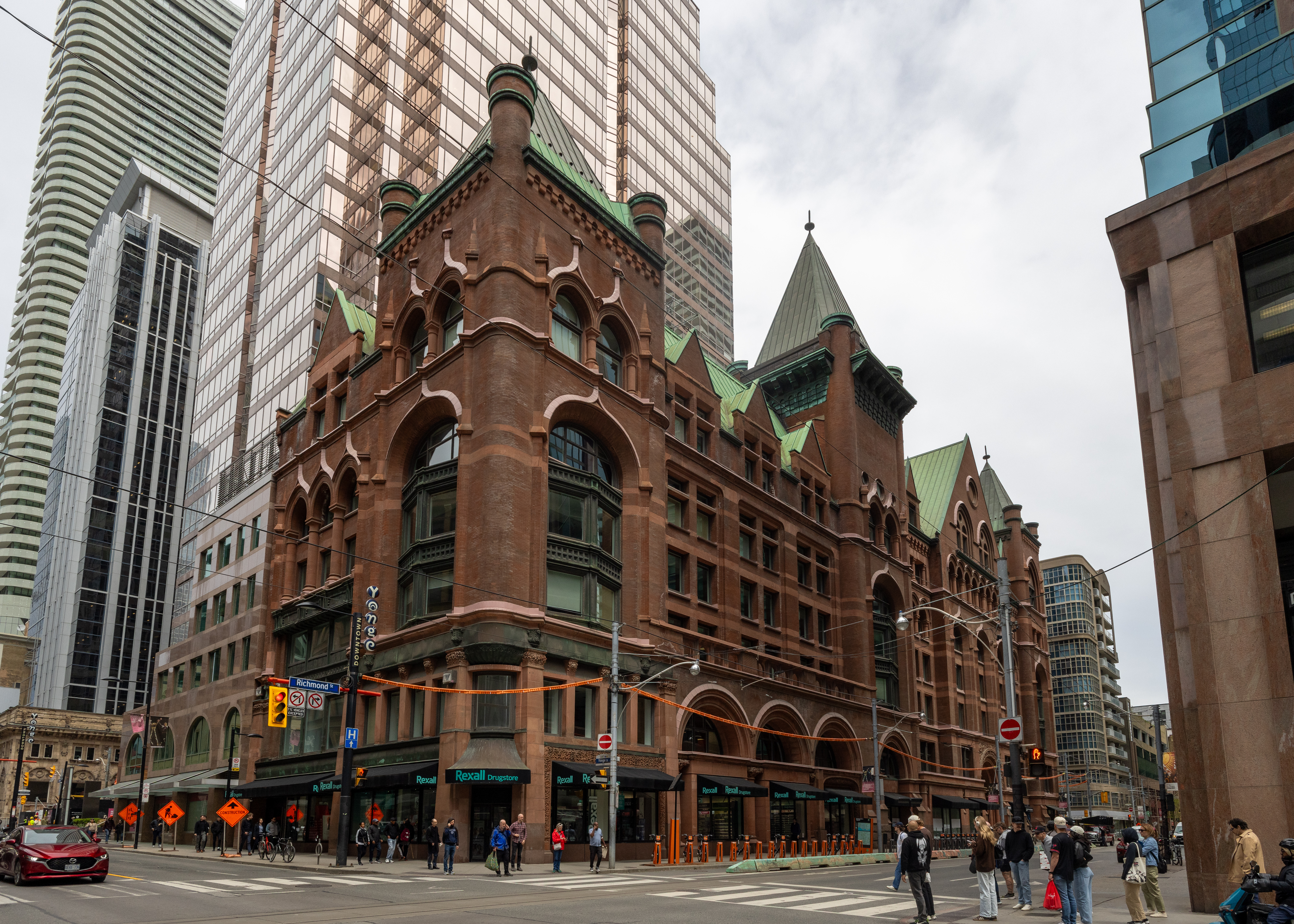
- The Confederation Life Building in 2026
- Interactive map of Confederation Life Building
- 43.652014°N 79.378484°W
- Location: Toronto, Ontario, Canada

History
- Built: 1892

Ontario Heritage Act
- Designated: November 26, 1975
- Designated by: Toronto City Council

The Confederation Life Building, a seven-floor Romanesque Revival office building, is a historic structure in Toronto, Ontario, Canada. Completed in 1892, it was designated a historic property by the City of Toronto under the Ontario Heritage Act on November 26, 1975.

It is located at 2–14 Richmond Street East on the north side of Richmond Street East, extending from Yonge Street to Victoria Street.

The building was once home to insurer Confederation Life, which launched a competition for designs for its new headquarters in May 1889. The winning entry came from architects Wilm Knox and John Elliot, whose firm Knox, Elliot and Jarvis had only been operating for a few years when it won design rights for the building. The life insurance company moved out in 1955.

A fire gutted the top floor of the building and destroyed the roof on June 3, 1981, but the structure survived and was restored for new tenants occupying the primary address at 20 Richmond Street East, with secondary addresses at 157 Yonge and 106 Victoria.

At some point, a Rev. F.A. Robinson had an office in suite 447 where people could order copies of religious books, such as Revell’s printing of G. Campbell Morgan’s 1902 book, ‘’’A First Century Message To Twentieth Century Christians’’’.

== Sources ==
- Arthur, Eric Ross; Otto, Stephen A. (1986). Toronto: No Mean City (3rd ed.). Toronto: University of Toronto Press. ISBN 0-8020-6587-2. OCLC 25914968.
- Osbaldeston, Mark (October 3, 2011). Unbuilt Toronto 2: More of the City That Might Have Been. Toronto: Dundurn. ISBN 978-1-4597-0093-2.
