= Ernest L. Ruddy =

American-Canadian advertising executive (1870–1954)

- Born: November 1, 1870; Holyoke, Massachusetts
- Died: November 24, 1954 (aged 84); Toronto
- Employer: Los Angeles Times
- Organization: Outdoor Advertising Association of America (President 1914-5)
- Known for: Outdoor advertising Founding E. L. Ruddy & Co

Ernest L. Ruddy (1 November 1870 – November 24, 1954) was an American-Canadian advertising magnate and the founder of E. L. Ruddy & Co and the Regent Theatre Company.

== Early life and education ==
Ernest L. Ruddy was born on 1 November 1870 in Holyoke, Massachusetts.

== Career ==
He worked in the print department of the Los Angeles Times, before relocating to Canada in 1894. He founded the Connor-Ruddy Company in 1904 or 1905, which became the E. L. Ruddy & Co in 1912, following the merger of Connor-Ruddy Company's activities with those of the Canadian sign-writer Walter Sutton. Ruddy was the president of the Outdoor Advertising Association of America from 1914 to 1915. In 1916, Ruddy and sales agent Nathan L. Nathanson supported the creation of the Regent Theatre Company, which took over the existing Majestic Theatre in Toronto and turned it into the Regent Theatre based on architectural design work by Thomas W. Lamb. The company gained the exclusive rights to show Paramount Films in Canada.

== Death ==
Ruddy died in Toronto on November 24, 1954, aged 84.
