= Reference Re Assisted Human Reproduction Act =

- Supreme Court of Canada

Hearing: April 24, 2009 Judgment: December 22, 2010
- Full case name: Attorney General of Canada (Appellant) v Attorney General of Quebec (Respondent), and Attorney General of New Brunswick, Attorney General for Saskatchewan, Attorney General of Alberta, Michael Awad, Canadian Conference of Catholic Bishops and Evangelical Fellowship of Canada (Interveners)
- Citations: Reference re Assisted Human Reproduction Act, 2010 SCC 61, [2010] 3 SCR 457
- Docket No.: 32750
- Prior history: APPEAL from a judgment of the Quebec Court of Appeal (Gendreau, Chamberland and Rayle JJ.A.), In the matter of a Reference by the Government of Quebec pursuant to the Court of Appeal Reference Act, R.S.Q., c. R-23, concerning the constitutional validity of sections 8 to 19, 40 to 53, 60, 61 and 68 of the Assisted Human Reproduction Act, S.C. 2004, c. 2, 2008 QCCA 1167, 298 D.L.R. (4th) 712, [2008] R.J.Q. 1551, [2008] Q.J. No. 5489 (QL), 2008 CarswellQue 9848.
- Ruling: Appeal allowed in part.

Court membership
- Chief Justice: Beverley McLachlin; Puisne Justices: Ian Binnie, Louis LeBel, Marie Deschamps, Morris Fish, Rosalie Abella, Louise Charron, Marshall Rothstein, Thomas Cromwell

Reasons given
- Plurality: McLachlin C.J., joined by Binnie, Fish and Charron JJ.
- Plurality: LeBel and Deschamps JJ., joined by Abella and Rothstein JJ.
- Concur/dissent: Cromwell J.

Reference Re Assisted Human Reproduction Act is an appeal from the Quebec Court of Appeal to the Supreme Court of Canada on a reference question posed as to the constitutional validity of the Assisted Human Reproduction Act that had been passed by the Parliament of Canada.

== Initial reference ==
The Court of Appeal was asked by the Government of Quebec to answer the following question:

Are sections 8 to 19, 40 to 53, 60, 61 and 68 of the Assisted Human Reproduction Act, S.C. 2004, c.2, ultra vires the Parliament of Canada in whole or in part under the Constitution Act, 1867?

The Court ruled in the affirmative in some respects of the question.

== Appeal to the Supreme Court ==
The appeal was allowed in part, with the Court rendering a rare 4-4-1 mixed decision. The justices' opinions were as follows:

= constitutionally valid
= constitutional to the extent that they relate to constitutionally valid provisions
= constitutionally invalid

Sections	McLachlin C.J. and Binnie, Fish and Charron JJ.	LeBel, Deschamps, Abella and Rothstein JJ.	Cromwell J.	Effective ruling of the Court
8-19			ss. 8, 9, 12 and 19	
8-19			ss. 10-11 and 13-18	
40-53			ss. 40(1), (6) and (7); 41-43; 44(1) and (4); 45-53	
40-53			ss. 40(2)-(5); 44(2)-(3)	
60				
61				
68				

=== The McLachlin opinion ===
The Act is essentially a series of prohibitions, followed by a set of subsidiary provisions for their administration. While the Act will have beneficial effects and while some of its effects may impact on provincial matters, neither its dominant purpose nor its dominant effect is to set up a regime that regulates and promotes the benefits of artificial reproduction. Here, the matter of the statutory scheme, viewed as a whole, is a valid exercise of the federal power over criminal law. The dominant purpose and effect of the legislative scheme is to prohibit practices that would undercut moral values, produce public health evils, and threaten the security of donors, donees, and persons conceived by assisted reproduction.

=== The LeBel/Deschamps opinion ===
The impugned provisions represent an overflow of the exercise of the federal criminal law power. Their pith and substance is connected with the provinces' exclusive jurisdiction over hospitals, property and civil rights, and matters of a merely local nature. The impugned provisions affect rules with respect to the management of hospitals, since Parliament has provided that the Act applies to all premises in which controlled activities are undertaken. Furthermore, the fact that several of the impugned provisions concern subjects that are already governed by the Civil Code of Quebec and other Quebec legislation is an important indication that in pith and substance, the provisions lie at the very core of the provinces' jurisdiction over civil rights and local matters.

=== The Cromwell opinion ===
The matter of the impugned provisions is regulation of virtually every aspect of research and clinical practice in relation to assisted human reproduction. The matter of the challenged provisions is best classified as relating to the establishment, maintenance and management of hospitals, property and civil rights in the province and matters of a merely local or private nature in the province. However, ss. 8, 9 and 12 in purpose and effect prohibit negative practices associated with assisted reproduction and fall within the traditional ambit of the federal criminal law power. Similarly, ss. 40(1), (6) and (7), 41 to 43, and 44(1) and (4) set up the mechanisms to implement s. 12 and, to the extent that they relate to provisions of the Act which are constitutional, were properly enacted by Parliament. Sections 45 to 53, to the extent that they deal with inspection and enforcement in relation to constitutionally valid provisions of the Act, are also properly enacted under the criminal law power. The same is true for ss. 60 and 61, which create offences. Section 68 is also constitutional, although its operation will be limited to constitutional sections of the Act. Given that the other provisions establishing the Assisted Human Reproduction Agency of Canada are not contested, there is no constitutional objection to s. 19.

== Aftermath ==
The Act was rectified and the remainder brought into force in the following stages:

Date	Measure	Description
29 June 2012	Jobs, Growth and Long-term Prosperity Act, S.C. 2012, c. 19, Part 4, Div. 56	On Royal Assent, repeal of unconstitutional provisions
30 September 2012	Order Fixing September 30, 2012 as the Day on which Subsection 713(2) and Certain Sections of the Act Come into Force, SI/2012-75	tidying up; transitional and consequential provisions
9 June 2019	Order Fixing (1) the First Anniversary of the Day on which this Order is Made as the Day on which Section 12 of that Act Comes into Force; and (2) the Day on which this Order is Made as the Day on which Sections 45 to 58 of that Act Come into Force, SI/2019-38	Implementation of the Administration and Enforcement (Assisted Human Reproduction Act) Regulations, SOR/2019-194
9 June 2020	Order Fixing (1) the First Anniversary of the Day on which this Order is Made as the Day on which Section 12 of that Act Comes into Force; and (2) the Day on which this Order is Made as the Day on which Sections 45 to 58 of that Act Come into Force, SI/2019-38	Implementation of the Reimbursement Related to Assisted Human Reproduction Regulations, SOR/2019-193
4 February 2020	Order Fixing the 240th Day After the Day this Order is Made as the Day on which Certain Provisions of that Act Come into Force, SI/2019-37	adding ss. 4.1 and 10 to the Act, which govern the regulation of the distribution, use or importation of donor sperm and ova, allowing for the consequential implementation of the Safety of Sperm and Ova Regulations, SOR/2019-192
