= William Gregory (judge) =

Chief Justice of Quebec from 1764 to 1766

William Gregory was Chief Justice of the Province of Quebec from 1764 to 1766.

Little is known of Gregory beyond being a lawyer from London with a checkered past and legal issues. On February 17, 1764 Gregory was appointed to become Chief Justice of the King's Bench of the Province of Quebec along with George Suckling as Attorney General. Gregory's lack of legal expertise in French civil law resulted in his term as Chief Justice ending in 1766, and he was subsequently replaced by William Hey.
