= Golden Square Mile =

Square Mile / Golden Square Mile
- Neighbourhood
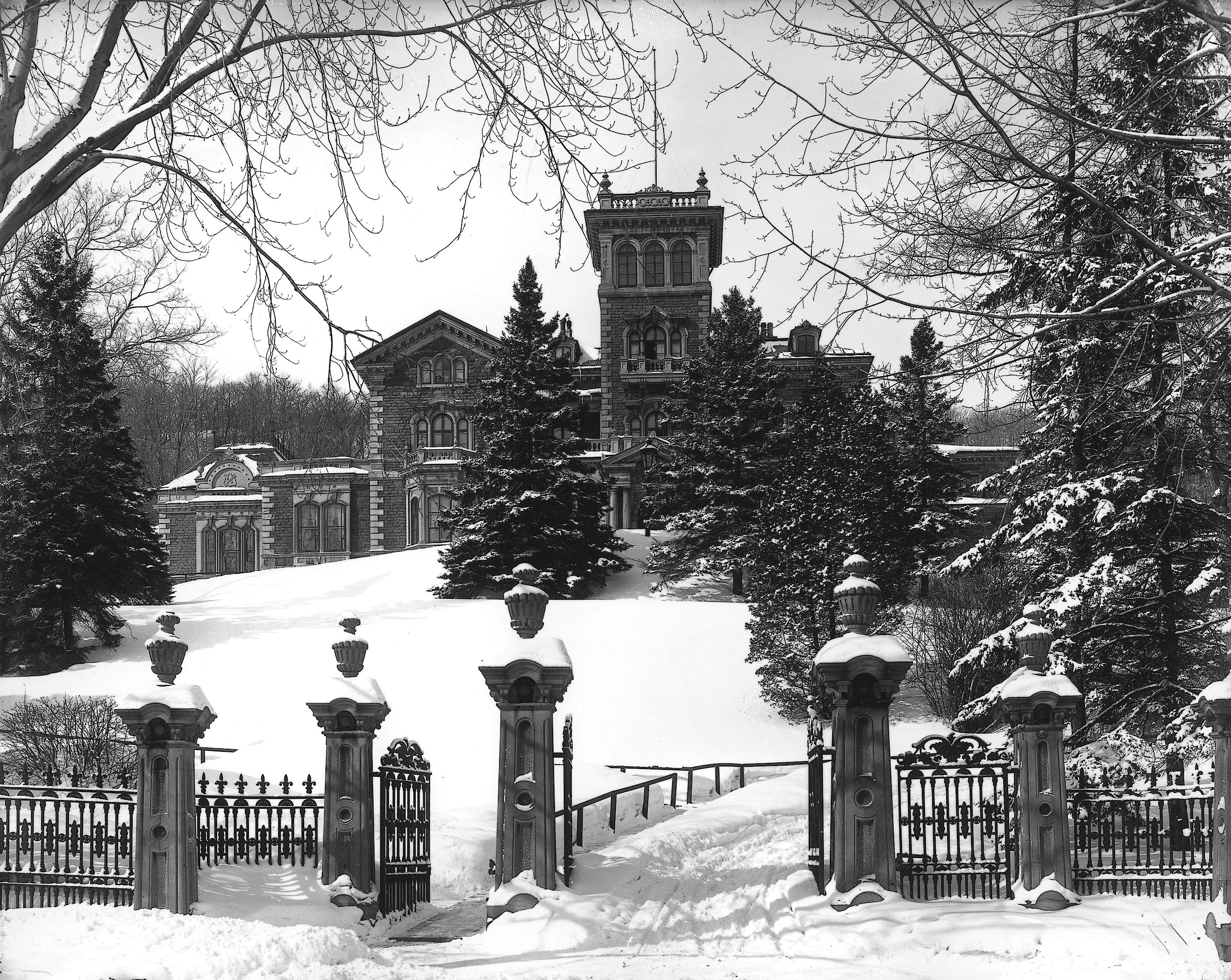
- Ravenscrag, built for Sir Hugh Allan in 1863

- Location of the Square Mile in Montreal
- Coordinates: 45.501111°N 73.582222°W
- Country: Canada
- Province: Quebec
- City: Montreal
- Borough: Ville-Marie
- Postal Code: H3A, H3G
- Area codes: 514, 438

The Golden Square Mile (French: Mille carré doré, pronounced [mil kaʁe dɔʁe]), also known as the Square Mile, is the nostalgic name given to an urban neighbourhood developed principally between 1850 and 1930 at the foot of Mount Royal, in the west-central section of downtown Montreal in Quebec, Canada. The name 'Square Mile' has been used to refer to the area since the 1930s; prior to that, the neighbourhood was known as 'New Town' or 'Uptown'. The addition of 'Golden' was coined by Montreal journalist Charlie Lazarus, and the name has connections to contemporary real estate developments, as the historical delimitations of the Golden Square Mile overlap with Montreal's contemporary central business district.

From the 1790s, the business leaders of Montreal looked beyond Old Montreal for spacious sites upon which to build their country homes. They developed the farmland on the slopes of Mount Royal north of Sherbrooke Street, creating a neighbourhood famous for its grandeur and architectural audacity. At the Square Mile's peak (1850–1930), its residents included the owners and operators of the majority of Canadian rail, shipping, timber, mining, fur and banking industries. From about 1870 to 1900, 70% of all wealth in Canada was held by this small group of approximately fifty men.

By the 1930s, multiple factors led to the neighbourhood's decline, including the Great Depression, the dawn of the automobile, the demand for more heat-efficient houses, and the younger generations of the families that had built these homes having largely moved to Westmount. During the Quiet Revolution, some of the businesses created in Montreal, on whose fortunes the Square Mile had been built, moved to Toronto. In this period, the Square Mile evolved to gradually become the central business district, and many of its grand houses were demolished. The face of the Square Mile was altered, leading to the formation of Heritage Montreal to preserve historic architecture in the city.

By 1983, only 30% of the mansions in the northern half of the Square Mile had survived demolition; and only 5% survived south of Sherbrooke Street. Many of the remaining mansions, such as the James Ross House, today known as Chancellor Day Hall, are today owned by McGill University. Nevertheless, the mansions of the Golden Square Mile represent a prosperous period during which Montreal was the cultural and financial capital of Canada.

== Borders ==
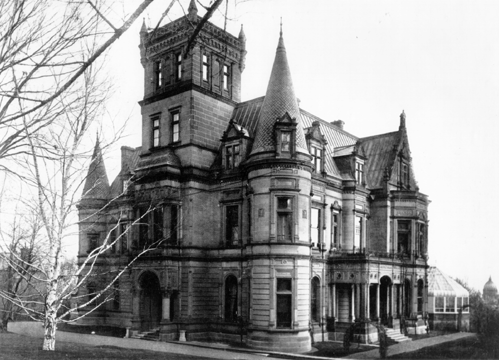
Duncan McIntyre's Craguie, built on 10 acres off McGregor Street c. 1880, demolished in 1930

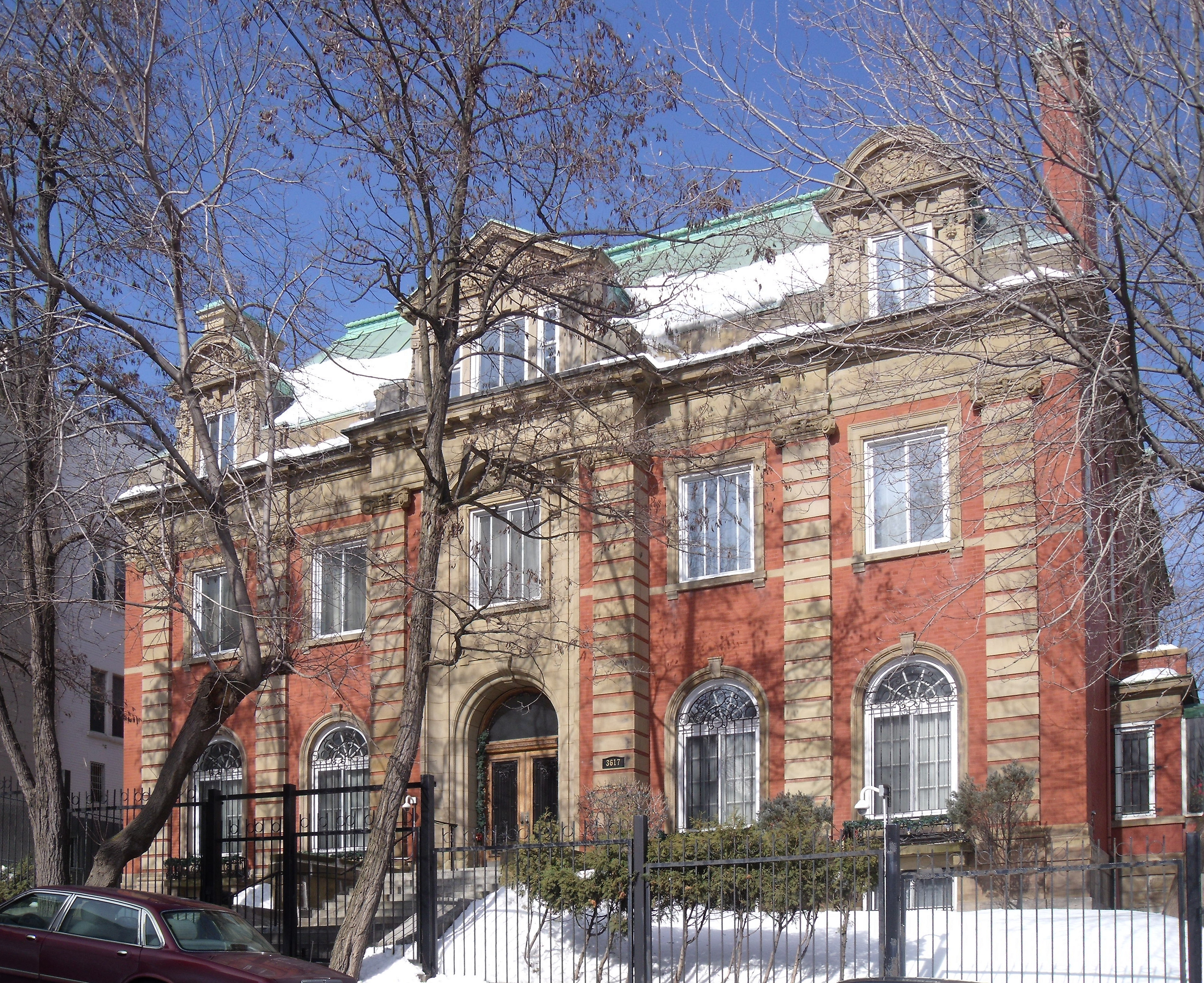
Herbert Molson House, designed by architect Robert Findlay in 1912

The neighbourhood had precise borders measuring roughly a square mile, covering the area between Dorchester Boulevard (now René-Lévesque Boulevard east of Atwater Avenue) at the southern end, Pine Avenue at the foot of Mount Royal at the northern end, University Street (now Robert Bourassa Boulevard south of Sherbrooke Street) at the eastern end, and Guy Street south of Sherbrooke Street and Côte-des-Neiges Road north of Sherbrooke Street at the western end. In effect, however, the 'Square Mile' was contained within a far smaller area, between Sherbrooke Street and Pine Avenue, and Côte-des-Neiges and University, covering scarcely nine streets on the north–south axis. From east to west: McTavish Street, Peel Street, Stanley Street, Drummond Street, Mountain Street, Ontario Avenue (now Avenue du Musée), Redpath Street, Simpson Street and Guy Street; and three streets on the east–west axis, from south to north: Sherbrooke Street West, McGregor Street (now Doctor Penfield Avenue) and Pine Avenue.

== Architecture ==
The architects of the Square Mile included Robert Findlay, Bruce Price, Sir Andrew Taylor, William Thomas, John Hopkins and the brothers Edward and William Maxwell. The architecture was an eclectic mix of the Neo-classical, Neo-Gothic, Romanesque, Second Empire, Queen Anne and Art Nouveau, though other styles also figured prominently, sometimes within the same home. By World War I, simpler houses were built, such as Herbert Molson's. Maison Cormier was one of only a few examples of Art deco.

Scottish sandstone and local granite were commonly used materials, and most homes had substantial grounds, atria and large conservatories. A great many of the Square Milers were keen horticulturalists and aside from their gardens, they enjoyed keeping hothouse flowers through the long winters. The streets of the Square Mile were lined with elm, spruce and maple trees, but an outbreak of Dutch elm disease in the 1970s destroyed those that had once lined Sherbrooke Street.

== Montreal's mercantile community (1642-1930) ==
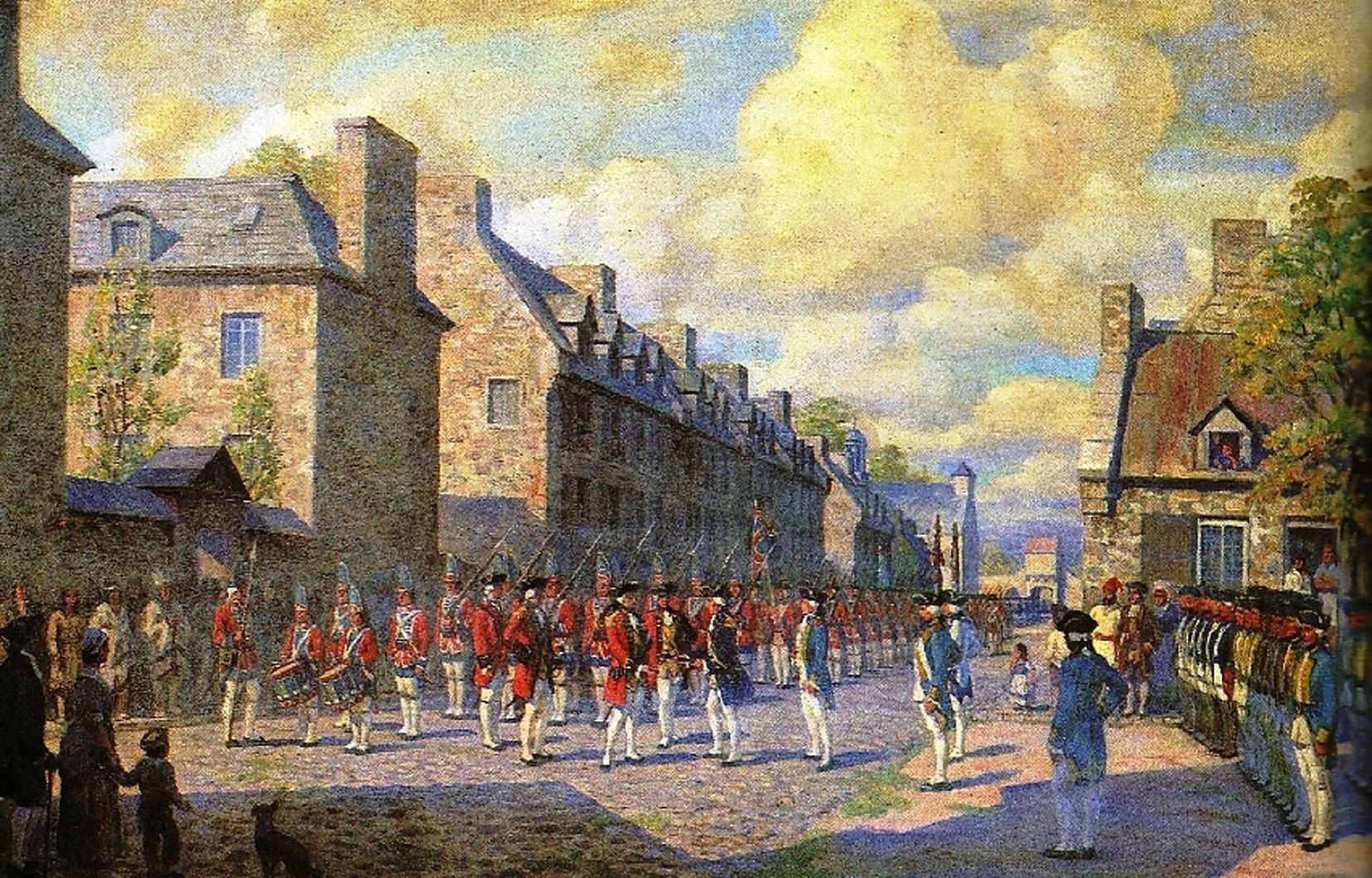
Surrender of Montreal to the British, 1760

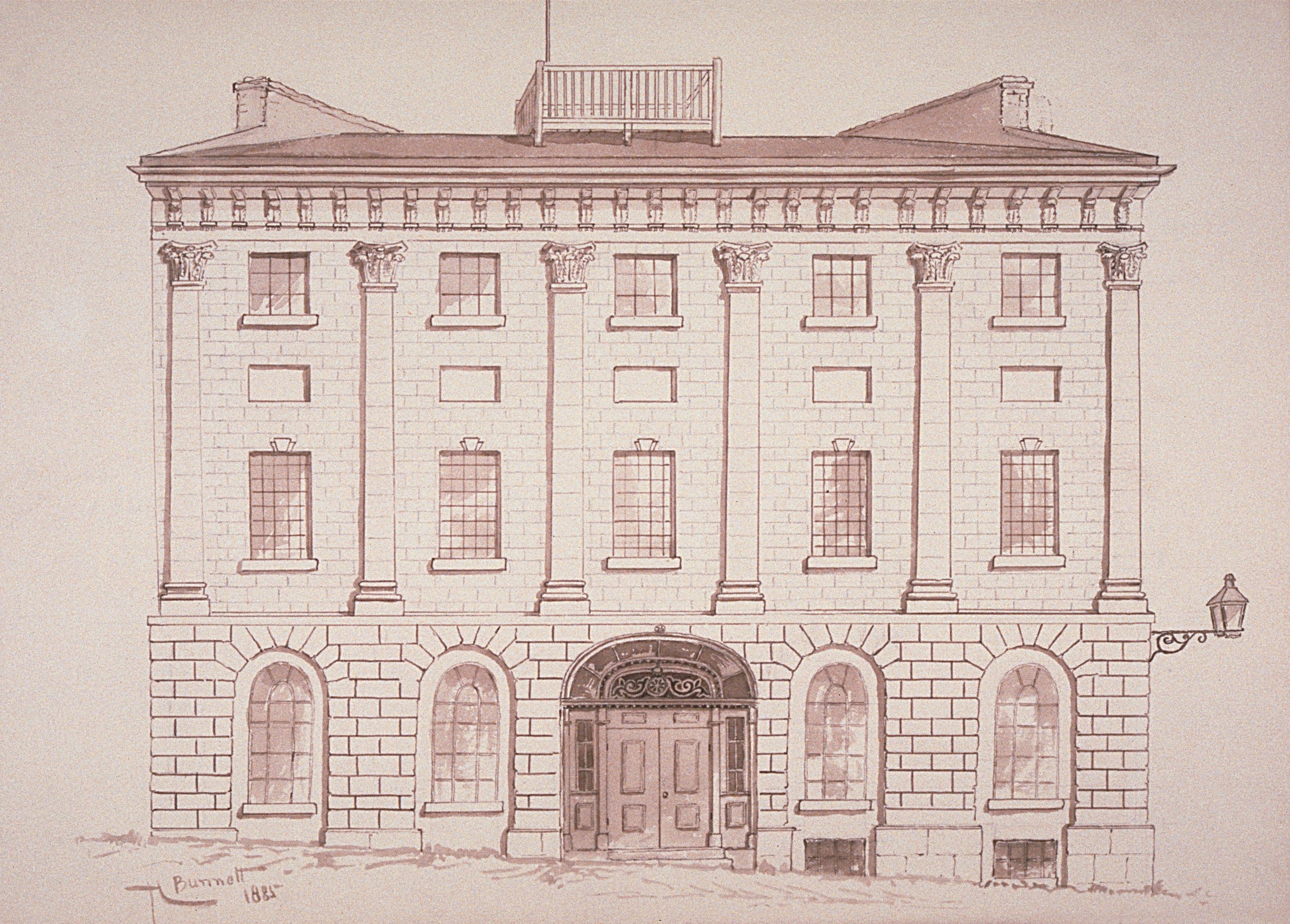
The Montreal townhouse of David Ross on the Champ de Mars, circa 1812

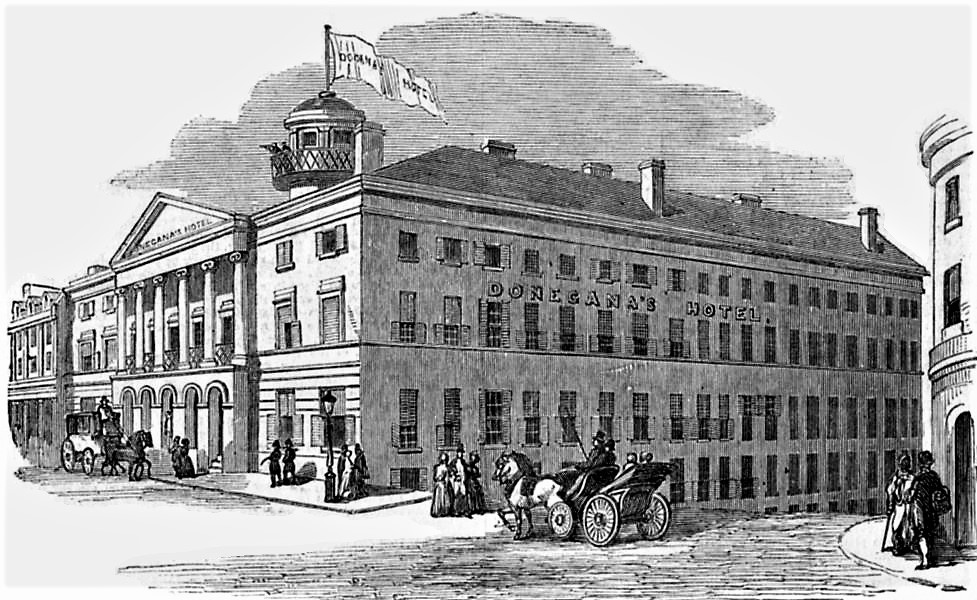
Donegana's Hotel on Notre-Dame Street, built in 1821 as a home for William and Charlotte (de Lotbinière) Bingham; as a hotel, it was the largest in the British colonies until it burnt in the riots of 1849

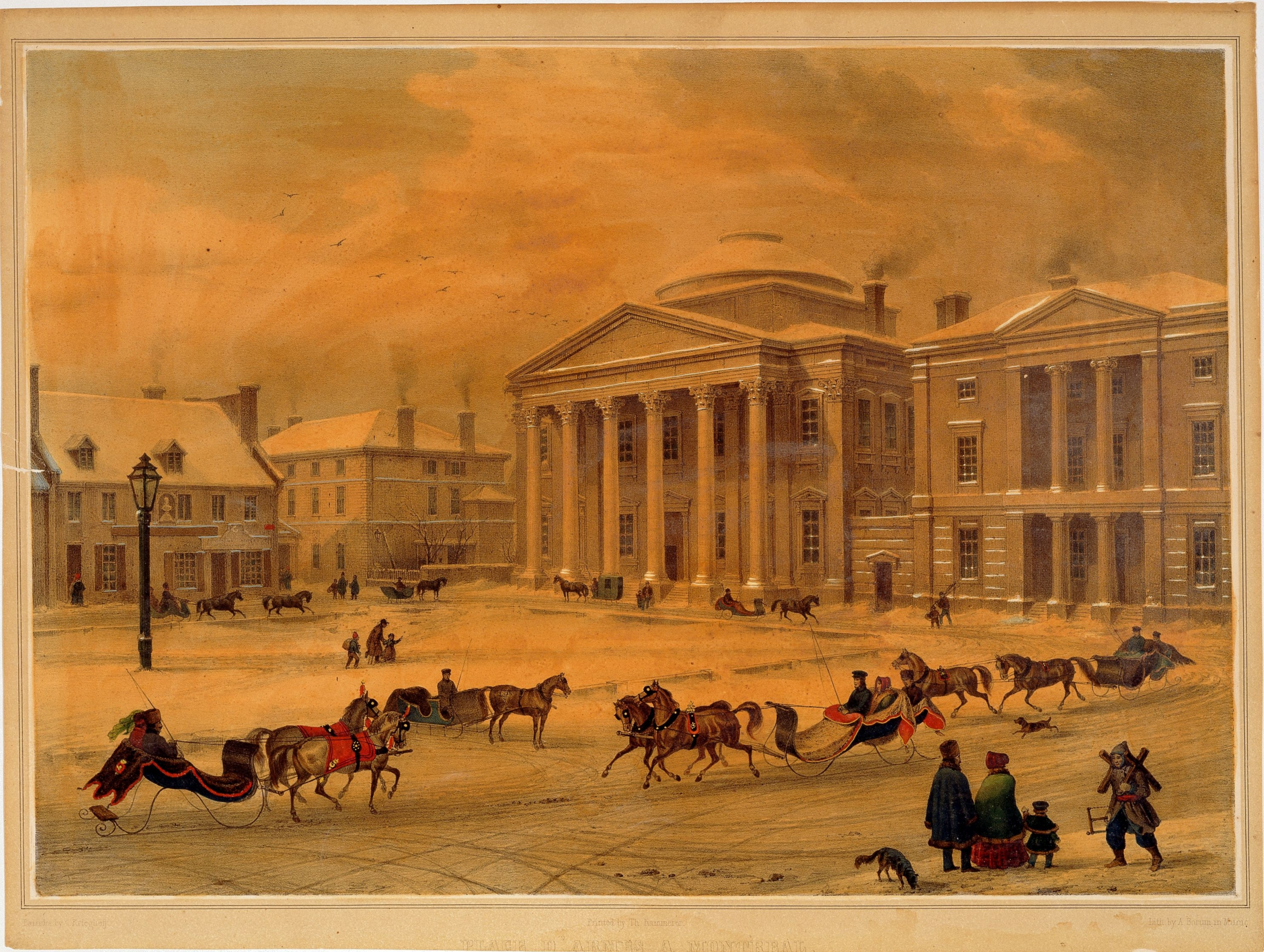
The Bank of Montreal on Place d'armes, founded in 1817 by one French and seven British merchants; it served as the national bank of Canada until 1934

In 1642, a fort named Ville Marie was founded on the Island of Montreal by Paul de Chomedey de Maisonneuve. Ville Marie became a centre for the fur trade and French expansion into New France until 1760, when it was surrendered to the British army, following the French defeat of the Battle of the Plains of Abraham. British immigration expanded the city.

The British immigrants who came to Montreal after the Conquest tended to be from well-connected mercantile families and immigrated to Canada as a means to further their fortunes, unlike earlier British immigrants who came to North America to escape religious or political persecution.

The city's golden era of fur trading began with the advent of the locally owned North West Company. In the 1760s, the men of the Beaver Club, a gentlemen's dining club, provided the financial backing and necessary management to take control of the fur trade. The new merchants were associated with the North West Company, the Hudson's Bay Company and the agents of the East India Company, and eventually dominated the fur market in most of British North America.

As many of the wealthy French Canadians moved from Canada to France following the Conquest, British merchants were able to cheaply purchase vast tracts of land upon which to build factories, and take control of the banking and finance of the new Dominion. The growing fortune of the Montreal mercantile elite of this era was consolidated through marriage and company mergers. After the collapse of the fur trade in the 1850s, the mercantile elite turned its interest to railways and shipping.

By the mid-19th century, the Montreal mercantile elite, residing in the Square Mile, firmly held the reins of Canada's economy. The merchants successfully connected Canada by building a network of railroads and exploiting maritime routes and the port of Montreal, which l remained the principal port through which immigrants arrived, and also through which Canada's produce was shipped to and from Britain and the Empire.

For decades, the wealth accumulated from the fur trade, finance, and other industries made of Montreal's mercantile elite a "kind of commercial aristocracy, living in lordly and hospitable style," as Washington Irving observed. In 1820, John Bigsby penned his impressions of the city:

I found, but did not expect to find, at Montreal a pleasing transcript of the best form of London life — even in the circle beneath the very first class of official families. But I may be pardoned; for I had seen in the capital of another great colony (Cape Town) considerable primitiveness of manners.. (In Montreal) at an evening party at Mr Richardson's the appointments and service were admirable; the dress, manners, and conversation of the guests, in excellent taste. Most of the persons there, though country-born, had been educated in England (Britain), and everything savoured of Kensington. There was much good music.. Some of the show-shops rival those of London in their plate-glass windows, and its inns are as remarkable for their palatial exterior as they are for their excellent accommodation within.. Montreal is a stirring and opulent town.. Few places have so advanced in all the luxuries and comforts of high civilisation as Montreal.

== Periods ==
=== Early estates ===
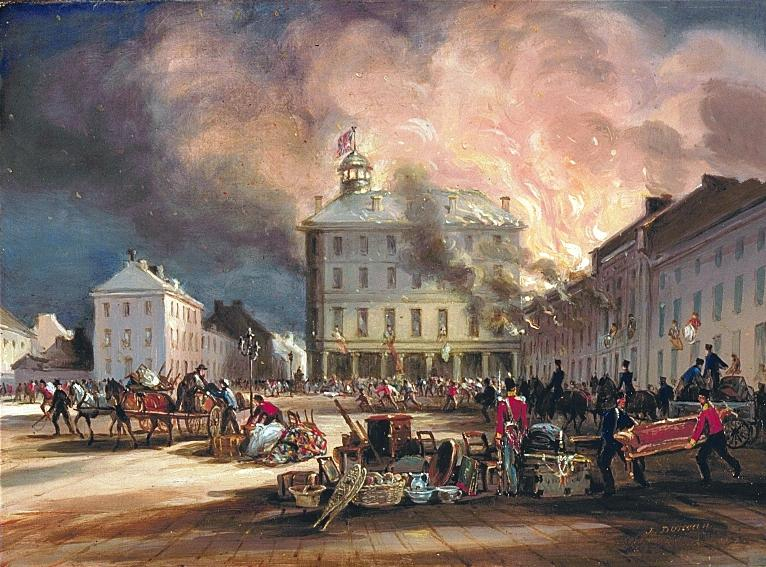
View of a fire in Old Montreal – Hayes House burning on Dalhousie Square (1852), up until then a favourite meeting place of the early Square Milers

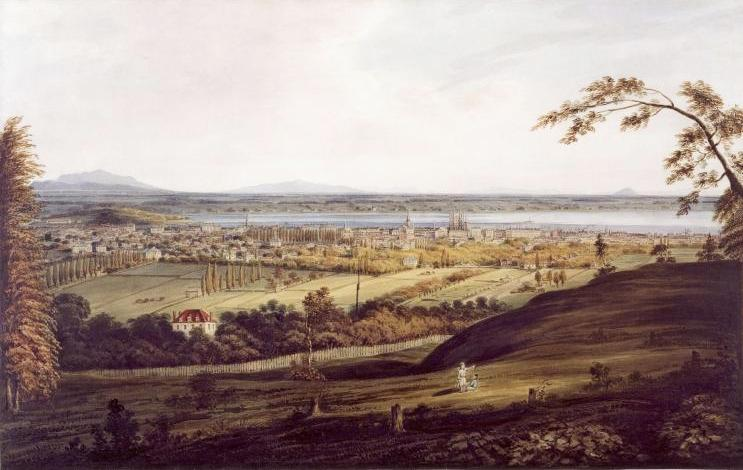
Montreal in 1832, showing the farmland on which the Square Mile was built

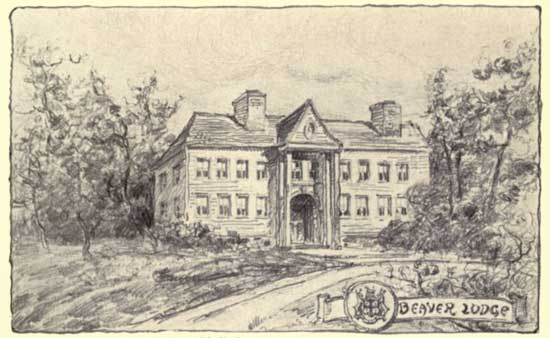
Beaver Hall, built in 1792 for Joseph Frobisher, destroyed by fire in 1847; the Beaver Club held many dinners here

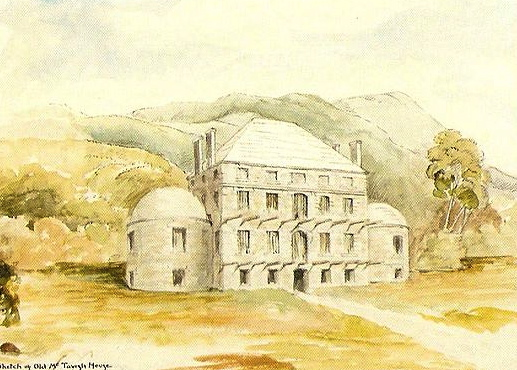
Simon McTavish's house, Mount Royal, built in 1800

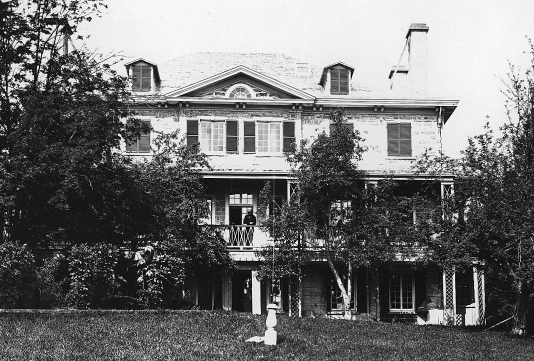
Piedmont (rear view), off Pine Avenue and Durocher Street, built c. 1820 and associated with the Frothingham family

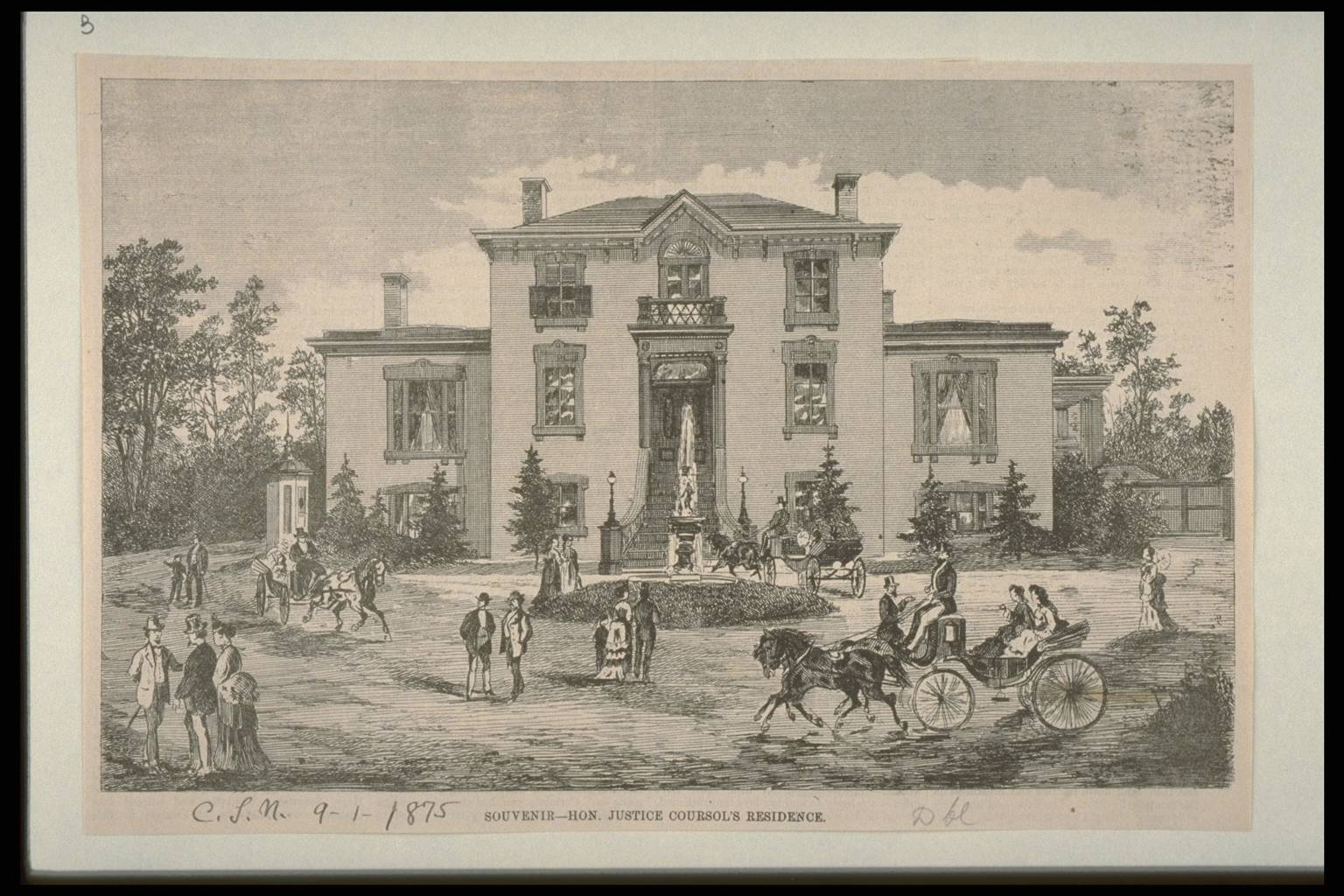
Manoir Souvenir, built in 1830 for Frederic-Auguste Quesnel, inherited by Charles-Joseph Coursol

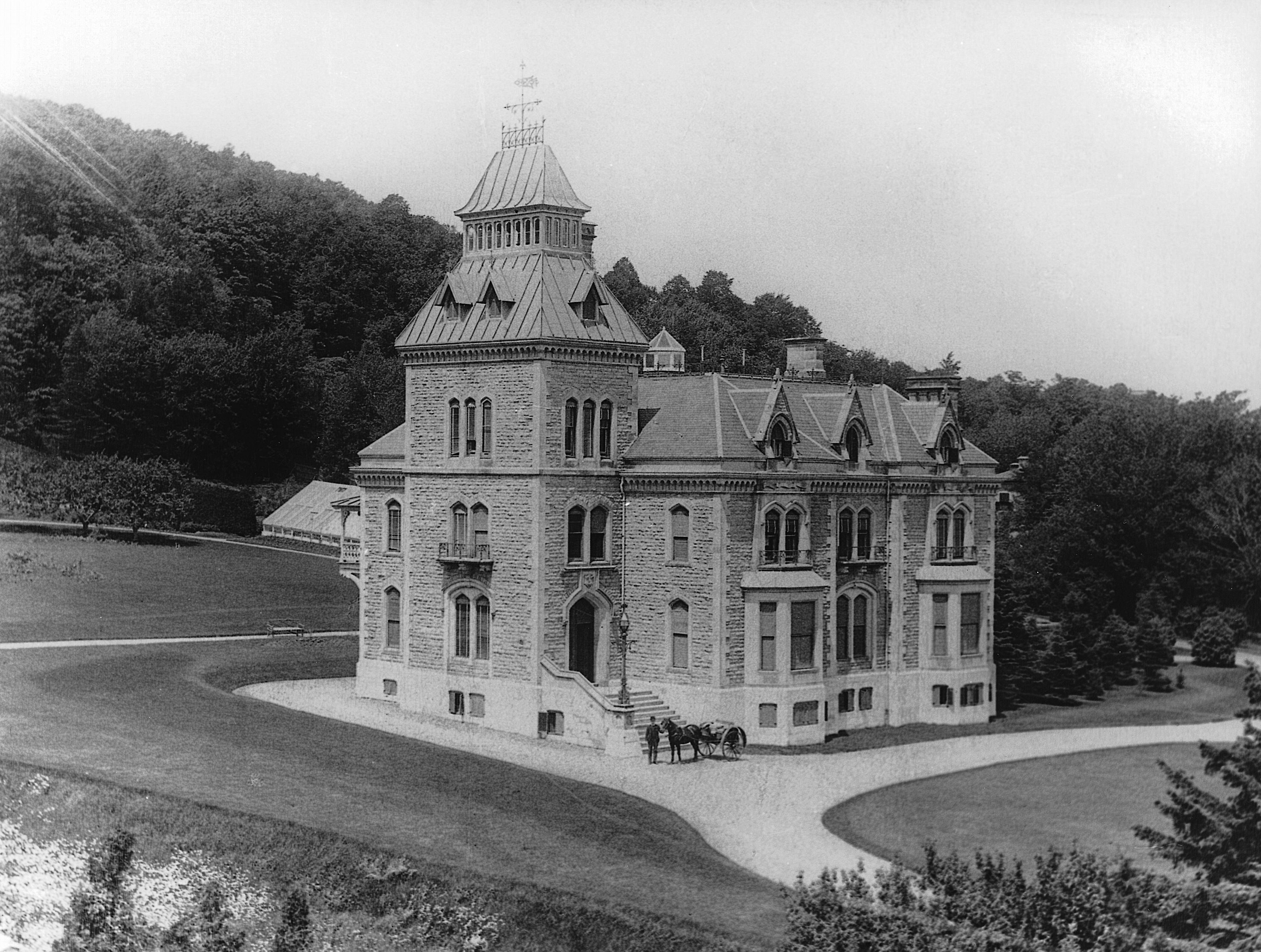
Terrace Bank, Sherbrooke Street, built in 1837 for John Redpath

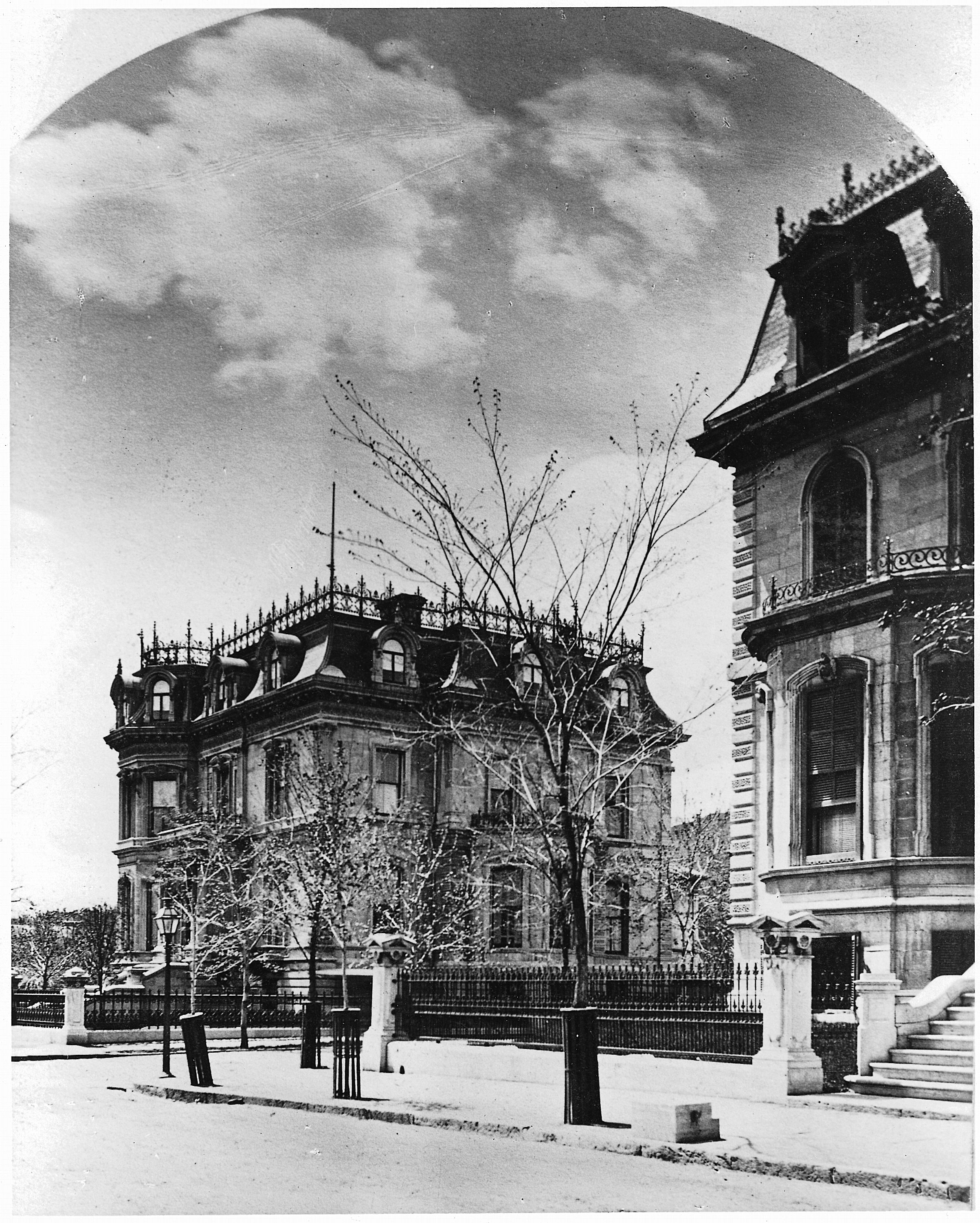
William Workman's house on Sherbrooke Street, built in 1842, demolished in 1952

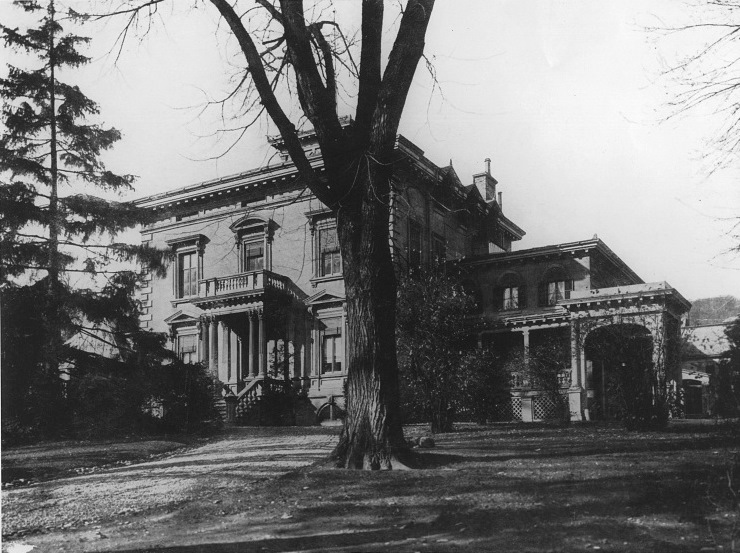
Kildonan Hall was typical in style of the houses that once lined west Sherbrooke Street in the 1840s

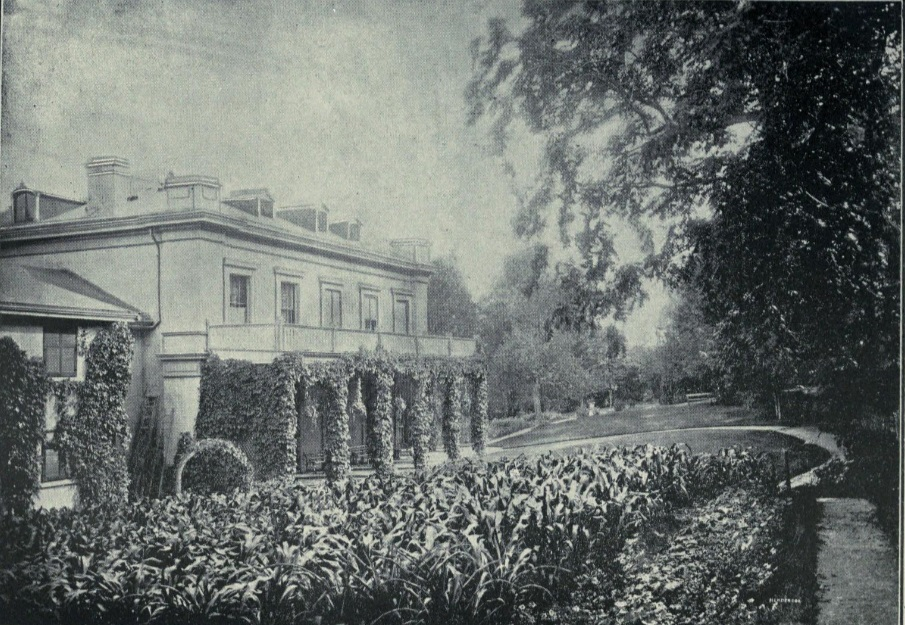
Rosemount House (rear view), McGregor Street, built in 1848 for Sir John Rose, 1st Baronet

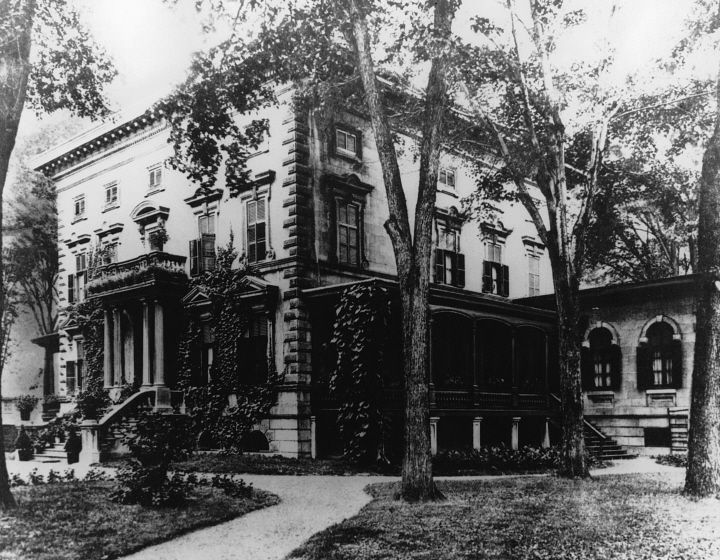
Homestead, Dorchester Street, built in 1858 for Harrison Stephens

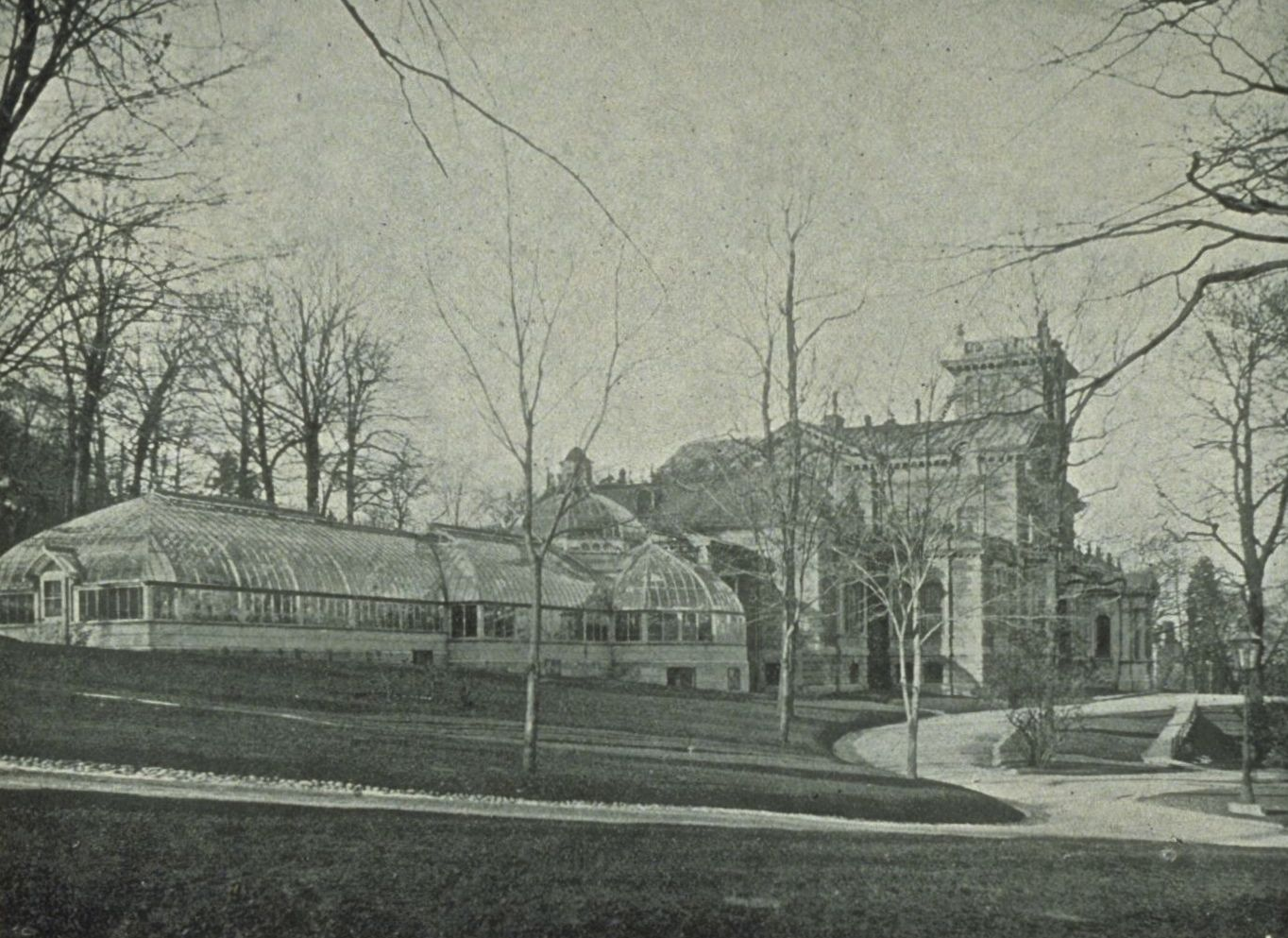
Ravenscrag, built in 1863 for Sir Hugh Allan, as seen from the west

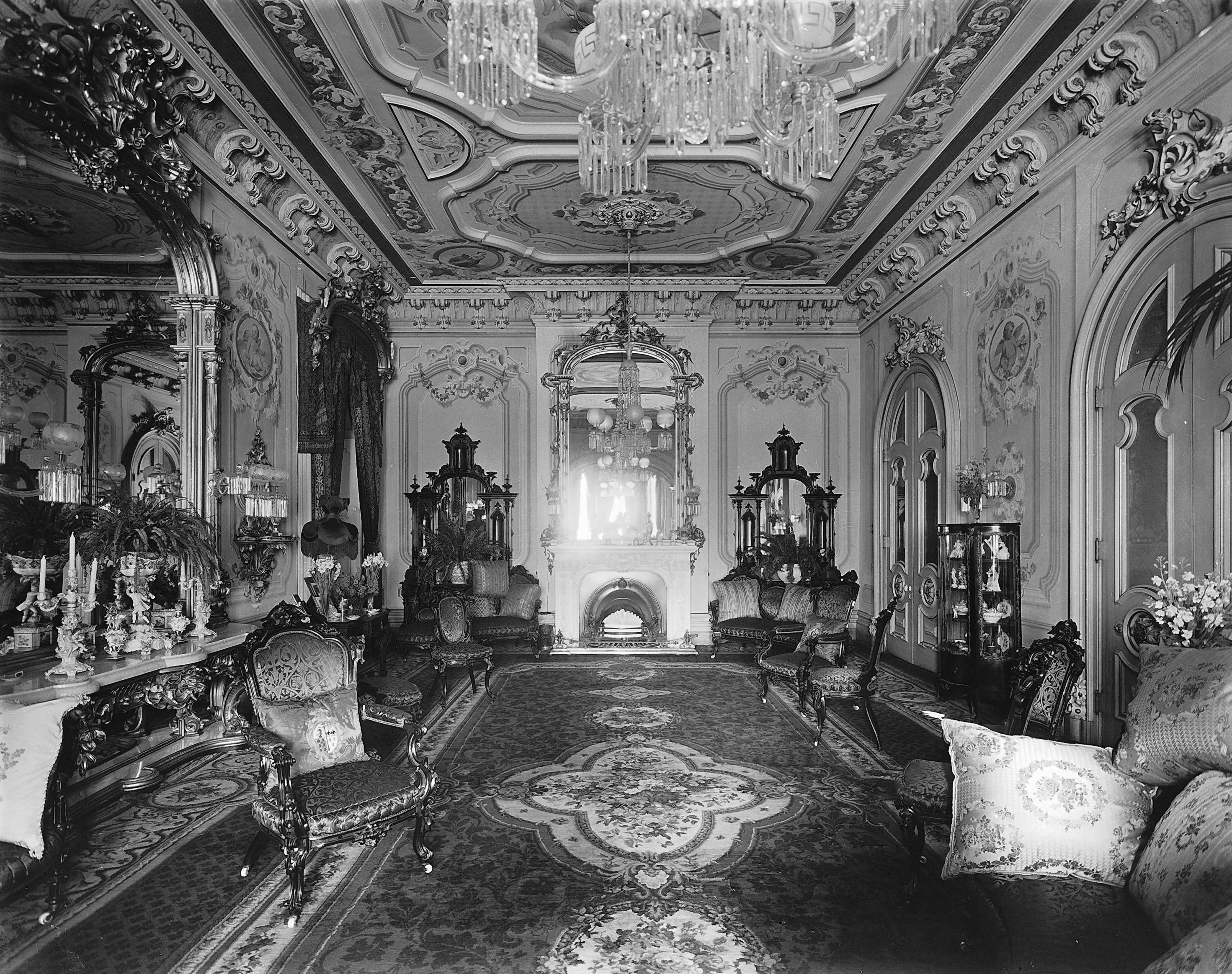
The drawing room at Ravenscrag

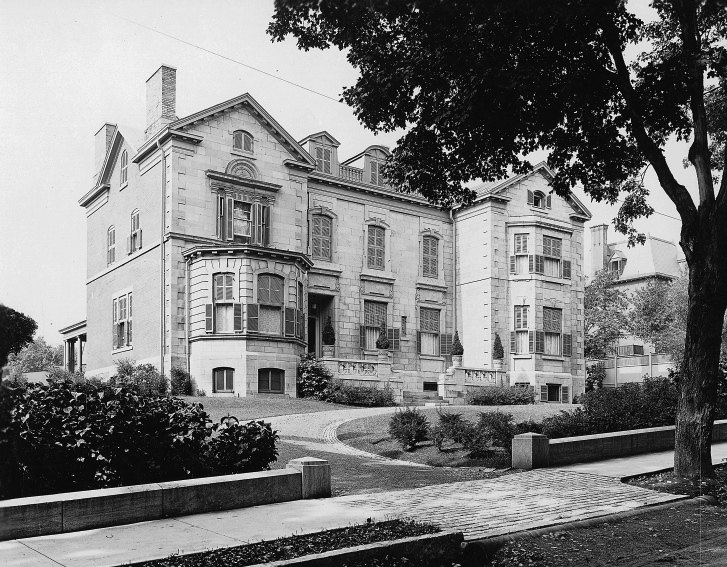
Lady Galt House, Simpson Street, built by Sir Alexander Tilloch Galt

Before the 1840s, the landed, political and wealthier merchant classes of Montreal lived on their seigneuries during the summers and came to the city only for Parliament or to conduct business during the winter. In 1816, Francis Hall, then a young officer with the 14th King's Hussars, observed that Montreal's gentry "live in a splendid style, and keep expensive tables". They kept townhouses on St. James Street, Notre-Dame Street and overlooking the Champ de Mars; enjoying among other entertainments the German Orchestra and Viennese dances held at the Hayes House theatre on Dalhousie Square. In 1795, Isaac Weld commented that "the people of Montreal, in general, are remarkably hospitable and attentive to strangers; they are sociable also amongst themselves, and fond in the extreme of convivial amusements".

But lively as it was, Old Montreal with its frequent fires and swelling population was becoming less desirable. The wealthy merchants in particular began to seek large plots of land on which to build homes worthy of their success while remaining close to their business interests; and, their eyes turned to the fertile farmland under Mount Royal. John Duncan observed in 1818 that, "a number of very splendid mansions have lately been erected on the slope of the mountain, which would be regarded as magnificent residences even by the wealthy merchants of the mother country". In 1820, John Bigsby described the view from Château St. Antoine, then said to be 'the most magnificent building in the whole city and standing within 200 acres of parkland roughly at the end of Dorchester Street:

I had the pleasure of dining with (William McGillivray) at his seat, on a high terrace under the mountain, looking southwards and laid out in pleasure-grounds in the English style. The view from the drawing room windows of this large and beautiful mansion is extremely fine, too rich and fair, I foolishly thought, to be out of my native England. Close beneath you are scattered elegant country retreats embowered in plantations, succeeded by a crowd of orchards of delicious apples, spreading far to the right and left, and hedging in the glittering churches, hotels, and house-roofs of Montreal...

The early residents of the Square Mile enjoyed marked benefits from being the first to settle there: The houses were surrounded by acres of parkland, with long carriage drives, vineries, orchards, fruit and vegetable gardens. The surveyor Joseph Bouchette noted that the produce from these gardens in the summer months was "excellent in quality, affording a profuse supply... in as much, or even greater perfection than in many southern climes". In 1822, Sir Richard Phillips commented that,

A number of handsome villas now make their appearance around the town, and there are numerous sites still unoccupied, which will probably be hereafter crowned with elegant seats. Few places in the world possess more capabilities of this kind than Quebec and Montreal; if the latter is less bold than the former in its scenery, it possesses much richness and delicate beauty, which need nothing but wealth and taste to display them to advantage; the former already exists in Montreal to a great extent, and there are also very respectable proofs of the existence and growth of the latter.

List of principal structures built

- Beaver Hall. Built in 1792, for Joseph Frobisher, it stood between the McTavish and McGill properties on the site that is today commemorated as Beaver Square. It stood amidst 40 acres made up of forest and apple trees, roughly where the Sun Life Building is today. The house measured 80 feet across and his dining room comfortably sat forty guests. It burned down in a fire in 1847.
- Burnside Place. Built in 1797, for James McGill. Unlike the mansions built by McGill's contemporaries, Burnside was a comfortable farmhouse of two stories over a basement for the kitchen and servants, standing on 46 acres of land, and used by the McGills during the summer. In his will, McGill bequeathed the property and £10,000 to establish a university, which would become McGill University. Immediately after his death, the house was occupied by his stepson, François-Amable Trottier DesRivières, who fought to keep the house for himself rather than give it to the Royal Institution for the Advancement of Learning as his stepfather had intended. The last person to occupy the house was John Bethune; it was replaced by the Arts Building in 1837. "Burnside Place" is visible in an early photograph by William Notman, a view from Mount Royal towards the harbour, taken in 1860. It was located roughly where McTavish and De Maisonneuve intersect. The Arts Building is located further up the hill. The engraving by John H. McNaughton, 1842, shows "Burnside" in relation to the McTavish House, which was located near the site of the new Arts Building.
- McTavish House. Built in 1800 for Simon McTavish. Constructed with dressed limestone by French masons. The facade of the main house measured 145 feet across, with two semi-circular towers, capped by typically French conical roofs at each end. Soon after its completion, it was described as "a large, handsome stone building.. at the foot of the mountain in a very conspicuous situation. Gardens and orchards have been laid out, and considerable improvements made, which add much to the beauty of the spot". The house was left empty from 1805 and was supposedly haunted by McTavish. It was demolished in 1860/61, when the estate was broken up and sold off in plots. Some of the stone from the original house was used to construct Braehead in 1861.
- Chateau St. Antoine. Built in 1803, for William McGillivray. A 'fine Georgian structure of cut stone', the house was described in 1816 as the most magnificent building in the whole of the city. The house, which boasted 'an enchanting' ballroom, stood on Cote St. Antoine near the end of Dorchester Street within 200 acres of parkland 'laid out in pleasure-grounds in the English style'. McGillivray was said to have lived like a lord, enjoying a magnificent view of the city and the river. The house was afterwards occupied by several different owners: John McKenzie, Louis-Joseph Papineau, Charles Wilson and finally the Desbarats family. It has since been demolished.
- McLeod House, Rue St. Antoine. A 'first class house' built circa 1810 for Archibald Norman McLeod, since demolished.
- St. Antoine Hall, St. Antoine Street; a forty-two room home built for John Torrance, 1818; A 'handsome residence' built in the palladian style, on a 'grand and sprawling estate,' renowned for its acres of gardens, greenhouses, vineyards and orchards, surrounded by a high brick wall. Since demolished.
- Piedmont, Pine Avenue; built before 1820, when Louis-Charles Foucher moved in with his family. It was purchased in the 1830s by John Frothingham; inherited in 1870 by John Henry Robinson Molson. The house stood among orchards and formal gardens and was approached by a long tree-lined drive on what are today the grounds of McGill University. Its 10 acres of grounds were purchased by Lords Strathcona and Mount Stephen in 1890, on which they built the Royal Victoria Hospital. The house was demolished in 1939.
- Lunn House, Sherbrooke Street; built in 1825 for William Lunn, demolished 1920
- Manoir Souvenir, between Dorchester Boulevard and the fashionable Rue Saint-Antoine; it stood within a park of 240 acres and was built in 1830 for Frédéric-Auguste Quesnel; afterwards inherited by his nephew, Charles-Joseph Coursol. It still stands today, though derelict and barely recognisable from its former grandeur.
- Terrace Bank, Sherbrooke Street; built in 1837 for John Redpath who purchased the 235-acre estate for £10,000 from the Desrivières family in 1836. He subsequently subdivided the property at a profit of £25,000, with little infringement on their space, before building his home on a plot amidst gardens and orchards with a private road that ran up to the house from the corner of Mountain and Dorchester streets. The house was enlarged by the Redpaths in 1861 and since demolished. The land on which the house stood has been replaced by Redpath Crescent.
- Kildonan Hall, 681 Sherbrooke Street West; built in the 1840s for Joseph Mackay. Named after Kildonan, Arran where he was born. In the photograph of the house its conservatory can just be made out on the left, and the coach house and stables are seen beyond the arch to the right of the house. Joseph's nephew, Robert Mackay, lived and died there in 1916. The house was demolished in 1930.
- Mount Prospect House, Sherbrooke Street; built in 1842 for William Workman, demolished 1952
- Athelstane Hall, 'a fine house' on St. Alexander Street; built in 1844 for John Smith, and afterwards occupied by Rev. Gavin Lang. Since demolished.
- Notman House, Sherbrooke Street; built 1843-45 for Sir William Collis Meredith, to the design of John Wells (architect). Although it lies outside the Square Mile and is of more modest proportions than its counterparts, it is the only surviving residence of its era on Sherbrooke Street - that was once lined with many like it. It is also one of Quebec's only few remaining Greek Revival residences. It was purchased by Alexander Molson circa 1865, who sold it in 1876 to William Notman, for whom it is named today. In 1894, it was purchased by Sir George Drummond for use as the St. Margaret's Home for Incurables. In 2012, it was purchased by the OSMO Foundation.
- Rosemount, McGregor Street; built in 1848 for Sir John Rose, 1st Baronet on land that he purchased from Sir George Simpson; purchased in 1871 by William Watson Ogilvie and altered by him in 1890; purchased in 1926 by Sir Percy Walters who demolished the house in 1943 to create 'Percy Walters Park'.

=== 1850 to 1869 ===
Following the strikes and the Burning of the Parliament Buildings in Montreal, the new decade was "like the arrival of a Montreal spring, prosperity and stability invigorated the city in the early 1850s". Sir Hugh Allan was elected President of the Montreal Board of Trade in 1851 and work on railways and steamships was evident everywhere, bringing with it a surge of construction. There were now a dozen architects practising in the city and the newly rich competed with one another for the largest, most decorative homes.

The city's lively reputation had not diminished, as Charles Goodrich suggested with a hint of disapproval: "If you wish to enjoy good eating, dancing, music and gayety, you will find an abundance of all (at Montreal)". While staying at Donegana's Hotel in 1853, Clara Kelly wrote to her father, Sir Fitzroy Kelly, describing her impressions of the city and the Square Mile in its infancy:

The scenery I find remarkably pretty, and, moreover, the city has an air of comfort, and to a certain extent of antiquity, rarely to be seen in the States.. The view from (Mount Royal's) summit is most picturesque, - green undulating land dotted with country houses and cottages, with beautiful gardens and trees.. The scene of the terrible fire which occurred here three years ago was pointed out to us. It has fearfully devastated a great part of the town. It seems difficult to understand how such a fire could have lasted so long a time and have done so much mischief, as the houses were not built of wood, which I had always imagined to be the case.. (We visited) a most beautiful and wonderful garden, belonging to a Montreal merchant (probably John Torrance of St. Antoine Hall), whose name I forget but who has collected here everything which is rich and rare, in shrub or flower.

Completed in 1863, Sir Hugh Allan's new house, Ravenscrag, was to be the jewel of the Square Mile, as he intended. He purchased fourteen acres from the decaying McTavish estate and built a sumptuous home of 72 rooms that excelled "in size and cost any dwelling-house in Canada," surpassing Dundurn Castle. By the 1860s, Montreal had come of age, which was recognised by three Royal visits from the future Edward VII, Prince Alfred and Prince Arthur, the most of any colony.

List of principal structures built

- Masson House, Dorchester Street; built c.1855 for Wilfrid Masson
- St. James's Club, Dorchester Street; built 1857, since demolished
- Homestead, Dorchester Street; built in 1858 for Harrison Stephens. The house remained in the Stephens family until his grandson sold it in 1929, and it was demolished.
- Strathearn House, Beaver Hall Hill; built in 1860 for William Dow, now a restaurant
- Braehead, McTavish Street; built 1861 for Orrin Squire Wood. Designed by James Brown and constructed of Montreal limestone taken from the demolished house of Simon McTavish, one whose original estate it stands. Purchased 1869 by Matthew Hamilton Gault. The next generation of the Gaults gave it to the army to be used as a convalescence hospital for disabled soldiers during World War I. Purchased by George H. Duggan in 1929, who donated it to McGill, 1944. Still standing, known as Duggan House.
- Mount View, Sherbrooke Street; built in 1862 for James Linton; altered, but still standing
- Ravenscrag, Pine Avenue; built 1863 for Sir Hugh Allan, now the Allan Memorial Institute
- David Law House, Cote des Neiges; built 1863, since demolished
- Iononteh, a greystone mansion that dominated upper Peel Street. Built 1865, for Andrew Allan by John W. Hopkins. Since demolished.
- Galt House, Simpson Street; built in the 1860s for Sir Alexander Tilloch Galt, later lived in by George Caverhill; since demolished
- Dilcoosha, Sherbrooke Street; built in the 1860s for Jesse Joseph, demolished in 1955 due to structural problems. McLennan Library Building now occupies the site.
- David Morrice House, Redpath Street; built in the 1860s, since demolished
- Prince of Wales Terrace, Sherbrooke Street; built in 1860 by Sir George Simpson, demolished in 1971 by McGill University to make way for the Samuel Bronfman Building.
- Victoria Skating Rink, Stanley Street; built in 1862, demolished after 1925. It was built through the capitalization of a number of industrialists of the area of the Victoria Skating Club.

=== 1870 to 1889 ===
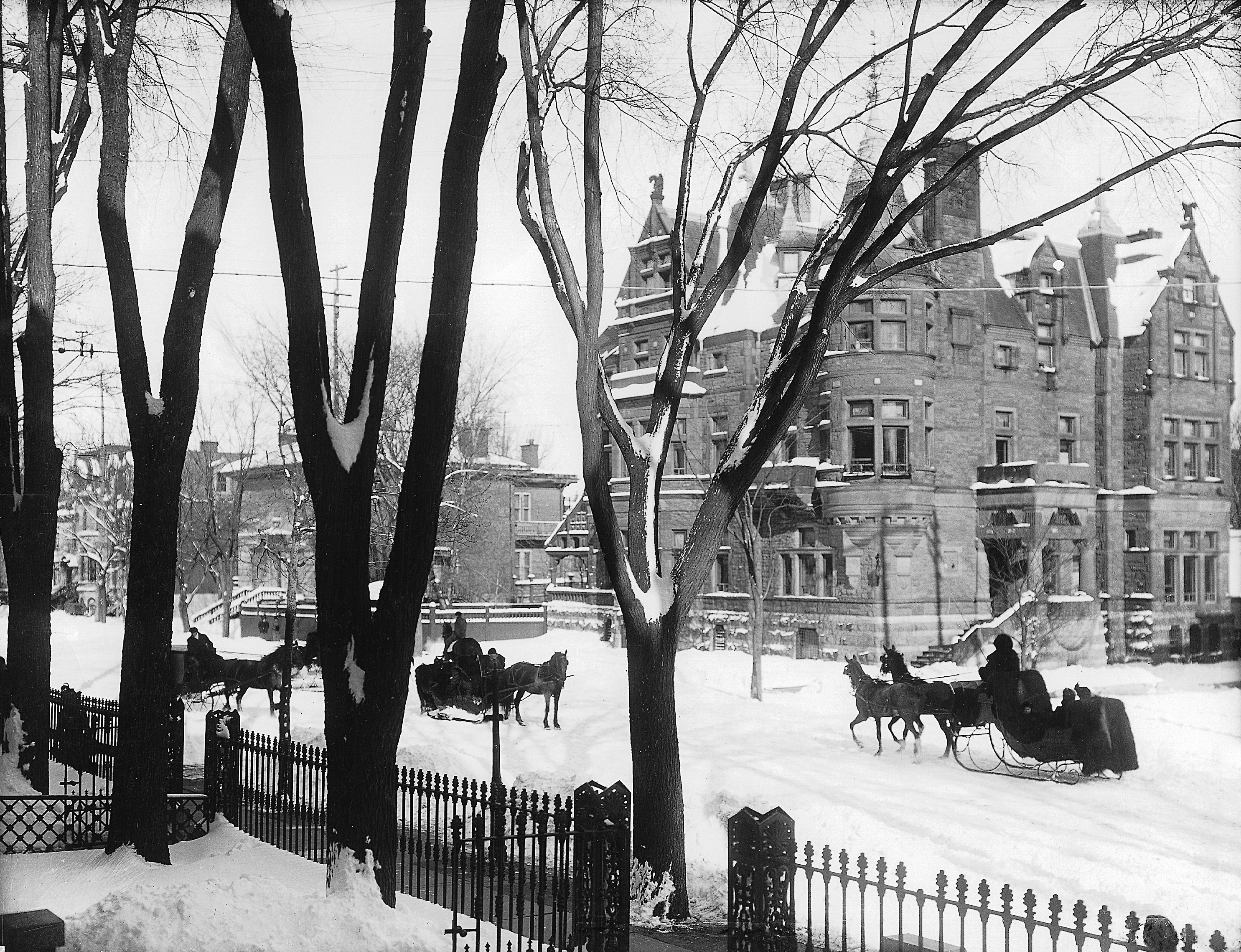
Sir George Drummond's House, built in the 1880s on Sherbrooke Street, at the corner of Metcalfe Street. Torn down in 1930, the site was used as a car wash

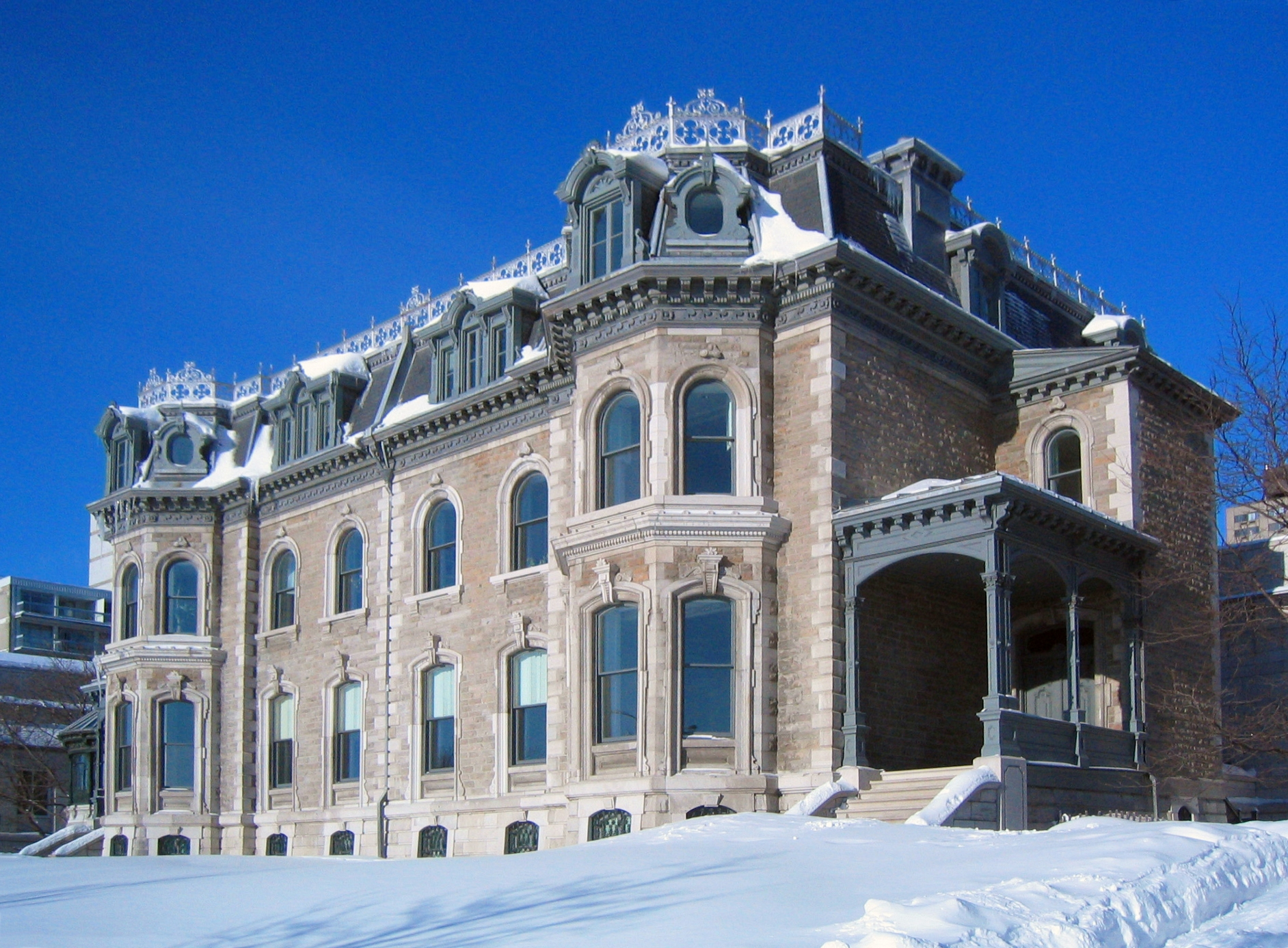
Lord Shaughnessy's House, reduced in size but saved from demolition in 1973; now the Canadian Centre for Architecture

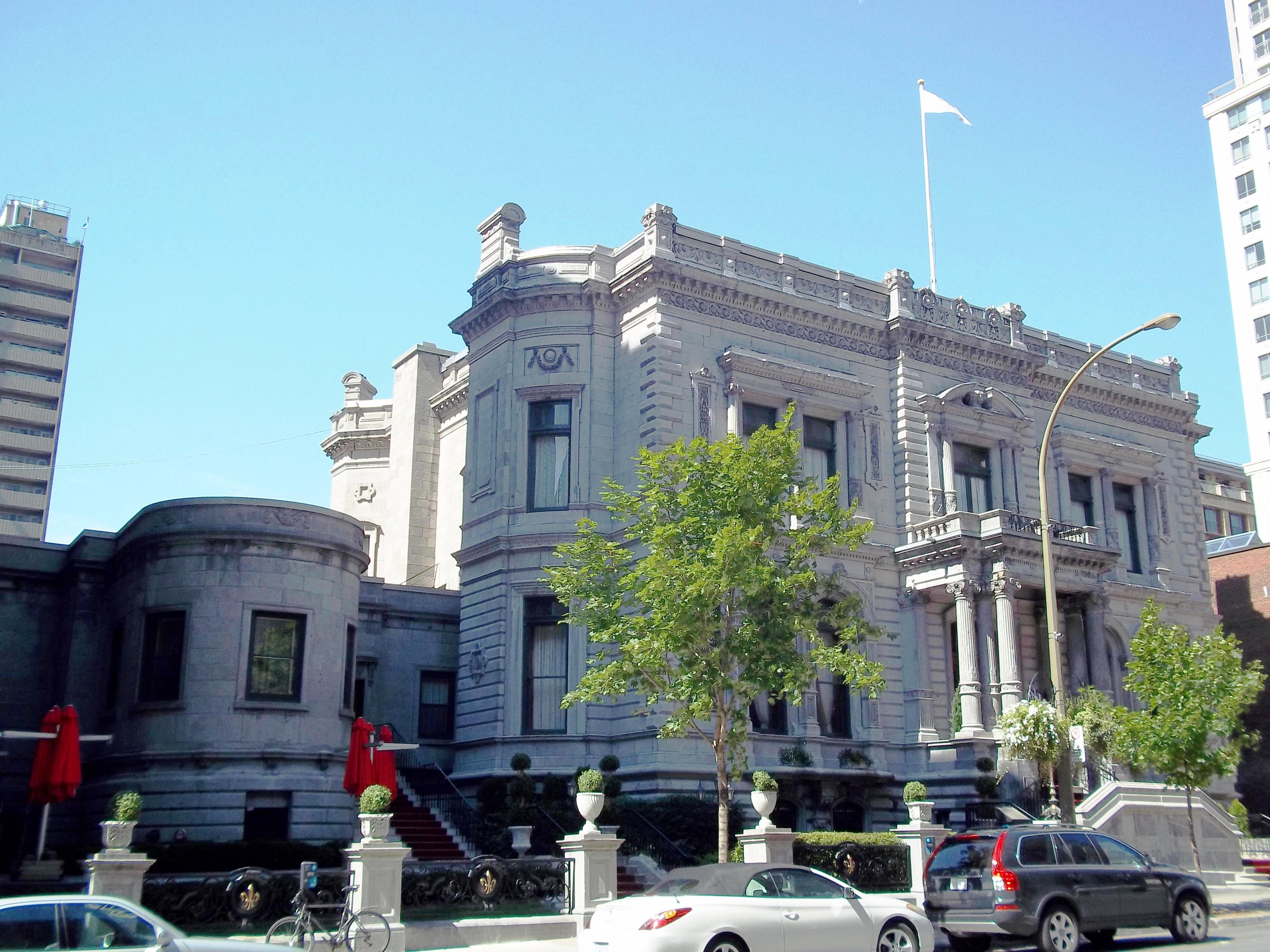
Lord Mount Stephen's home on Drummond Street. Built in 1880, and afterwards inherited by his niece, Elsie Meighen, it was saved from demolition when it was purchased by three anglophone businessmen who created the Mount Stephen Club in 1928.

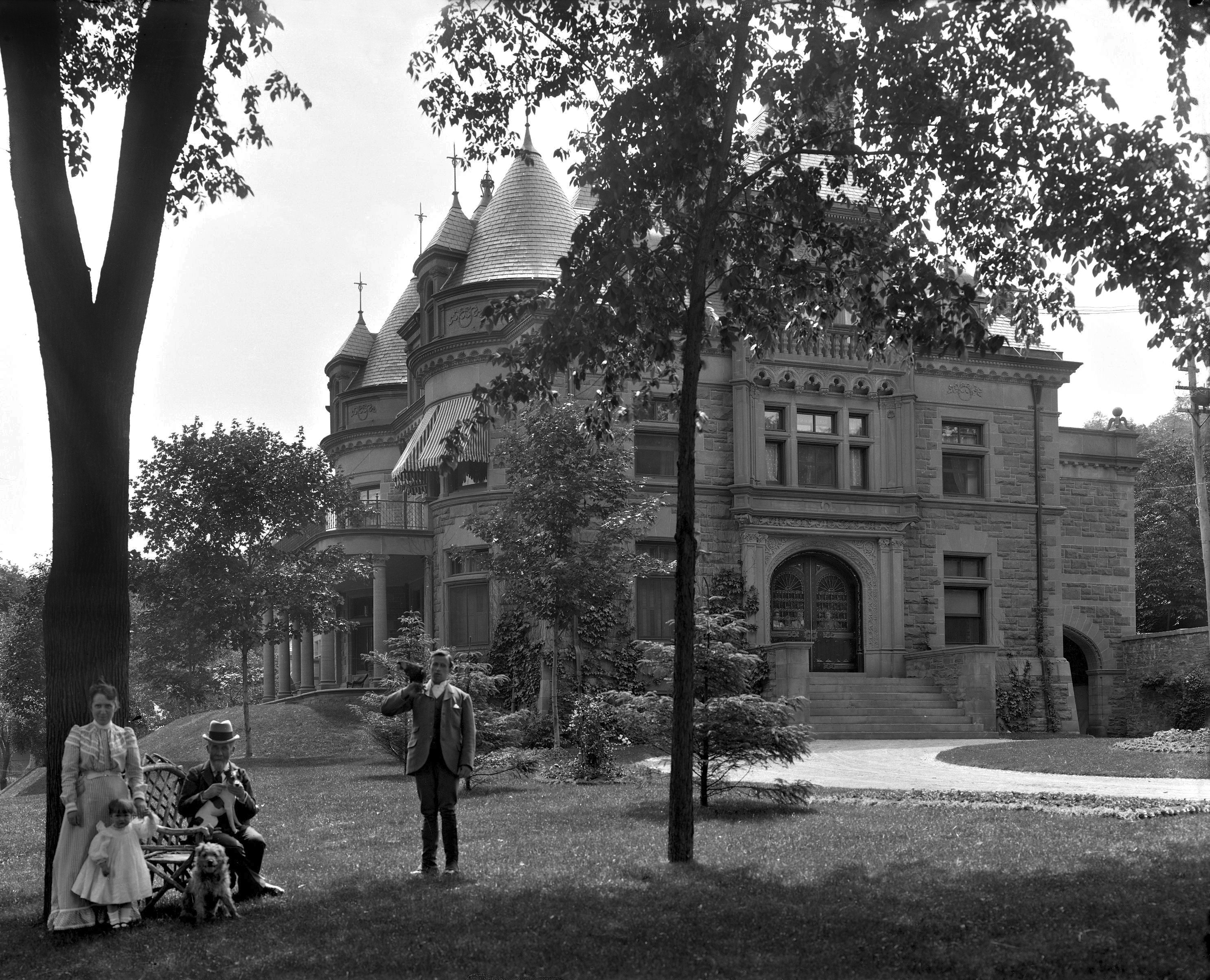
James Ross with his family outside their Peel Street home; built 1892

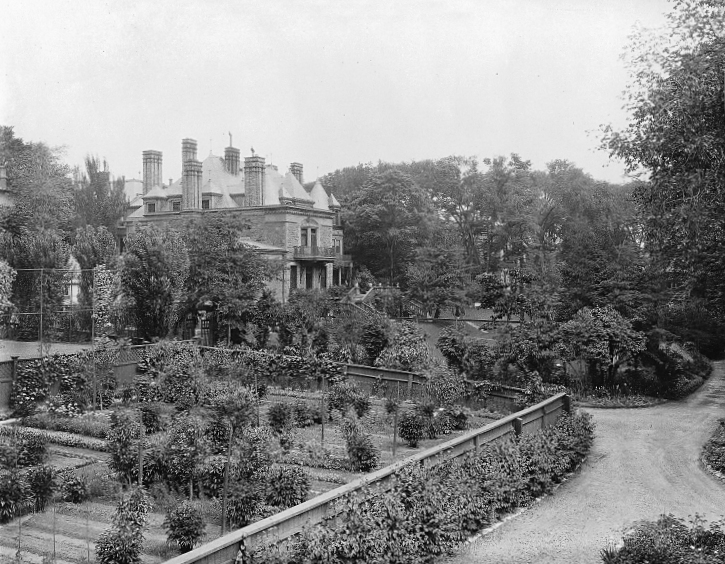
The grounds of James Ross house, Peel Street, 1926–27. In 1953, the city extended McGregor Street through these gardens

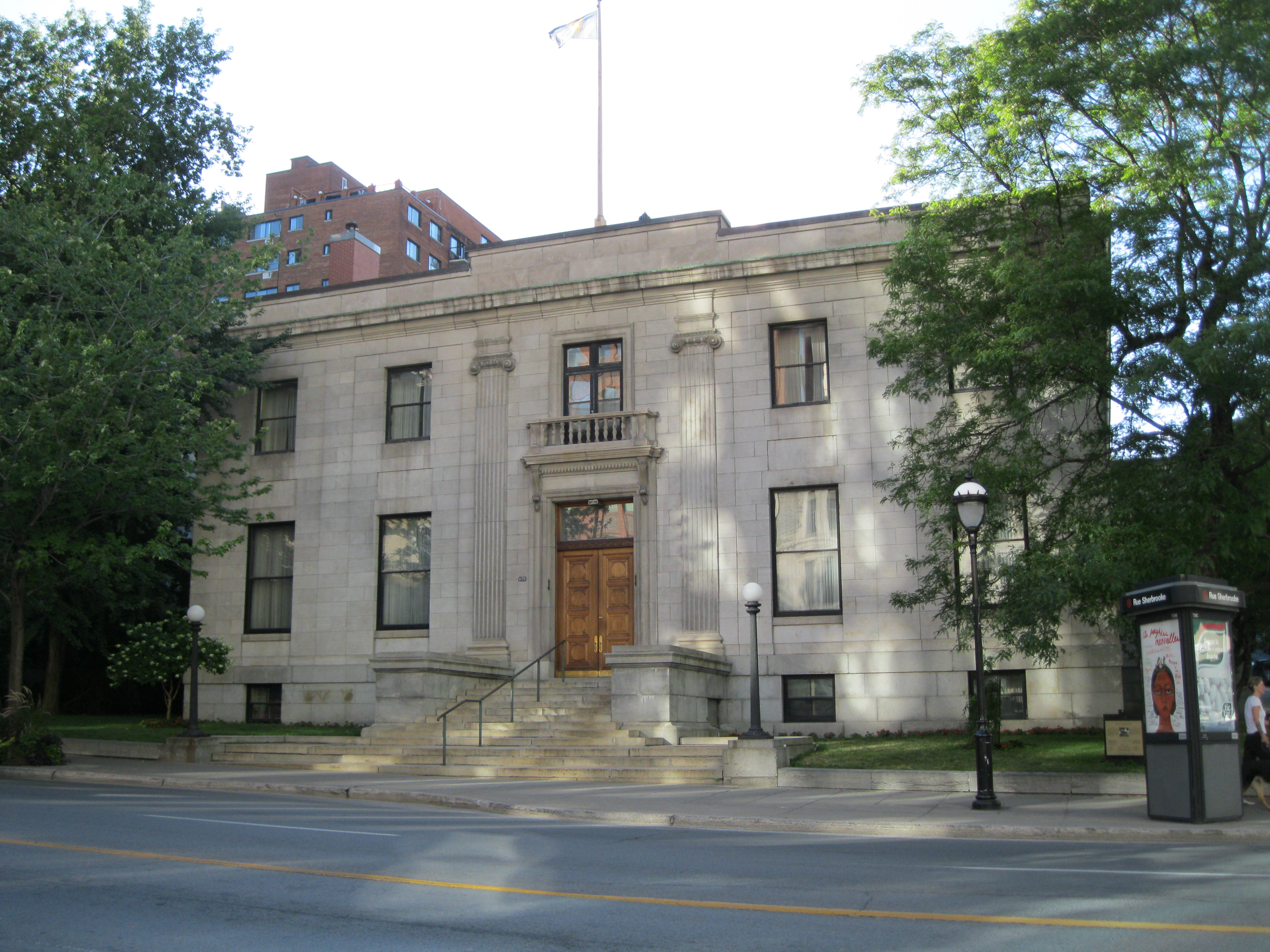
Mount Royal Club, Sherbrooke Street; founded in 1899 after the leaders of the Square Mile felt that the St. James Club had become "too overcrowded"

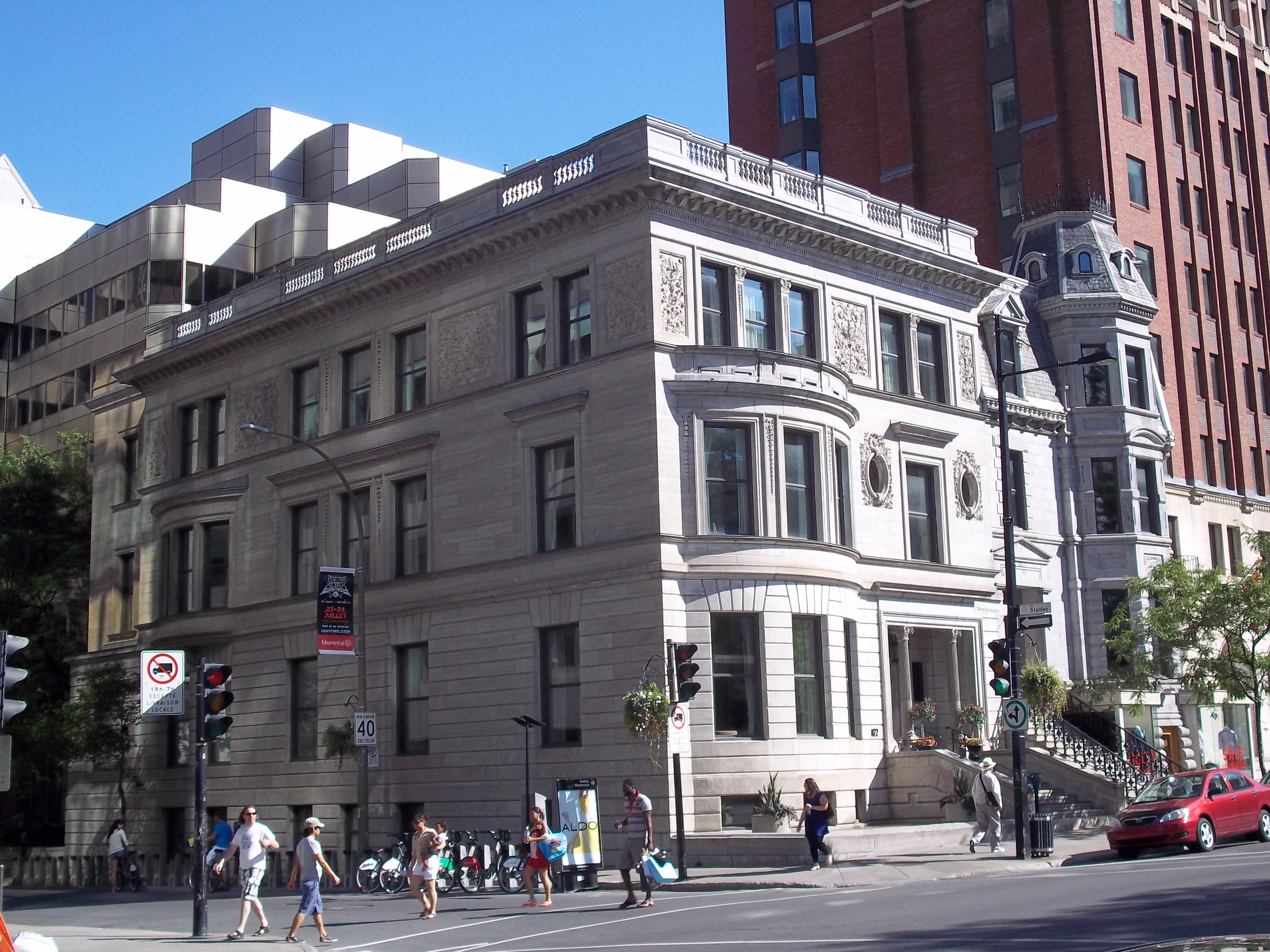
Lord Atholstan's house on Sherbrooke Street

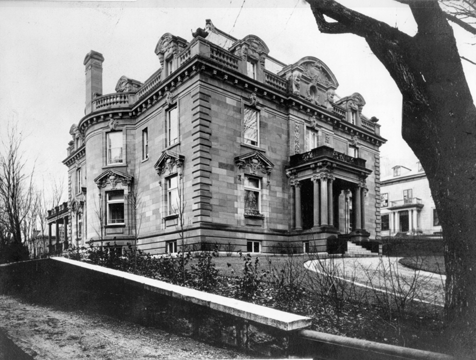
Charles Hosmer's house on Drummond Street, 1901

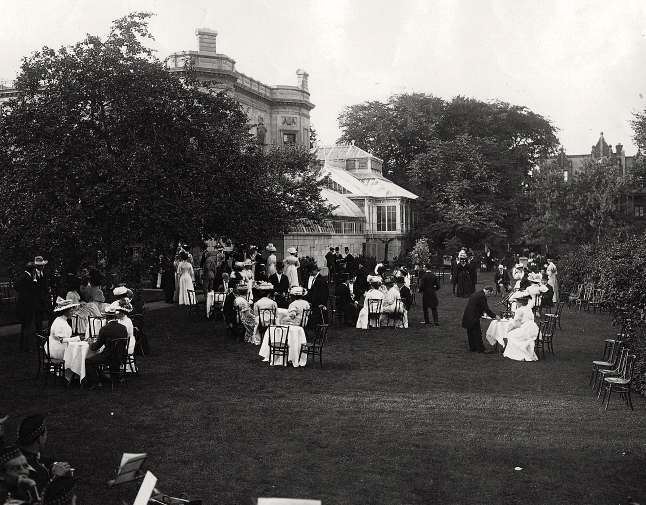
Garden party at the Meighen's house, 1908

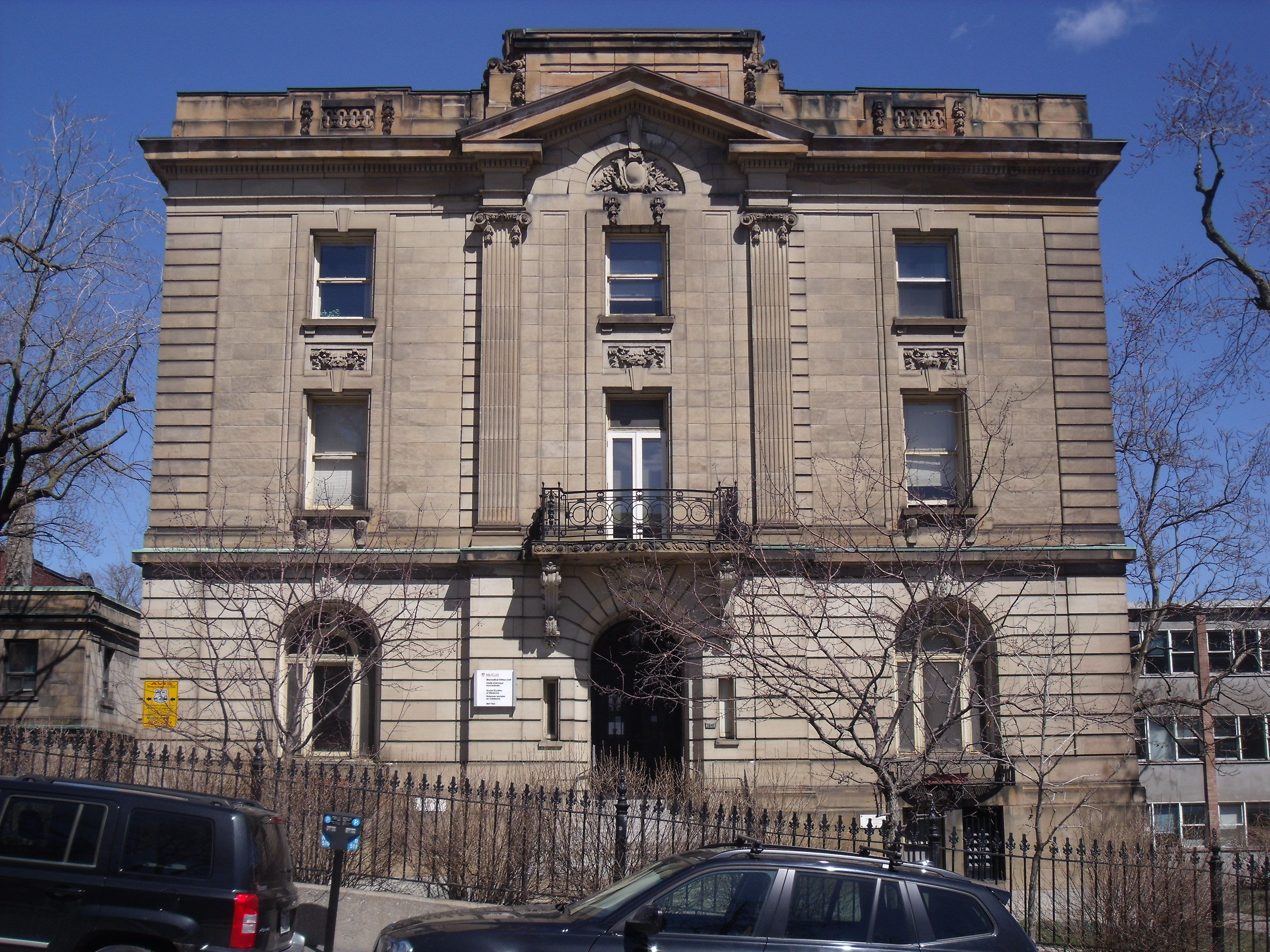
J.K.L. Ross House, Peel Street; built 1910

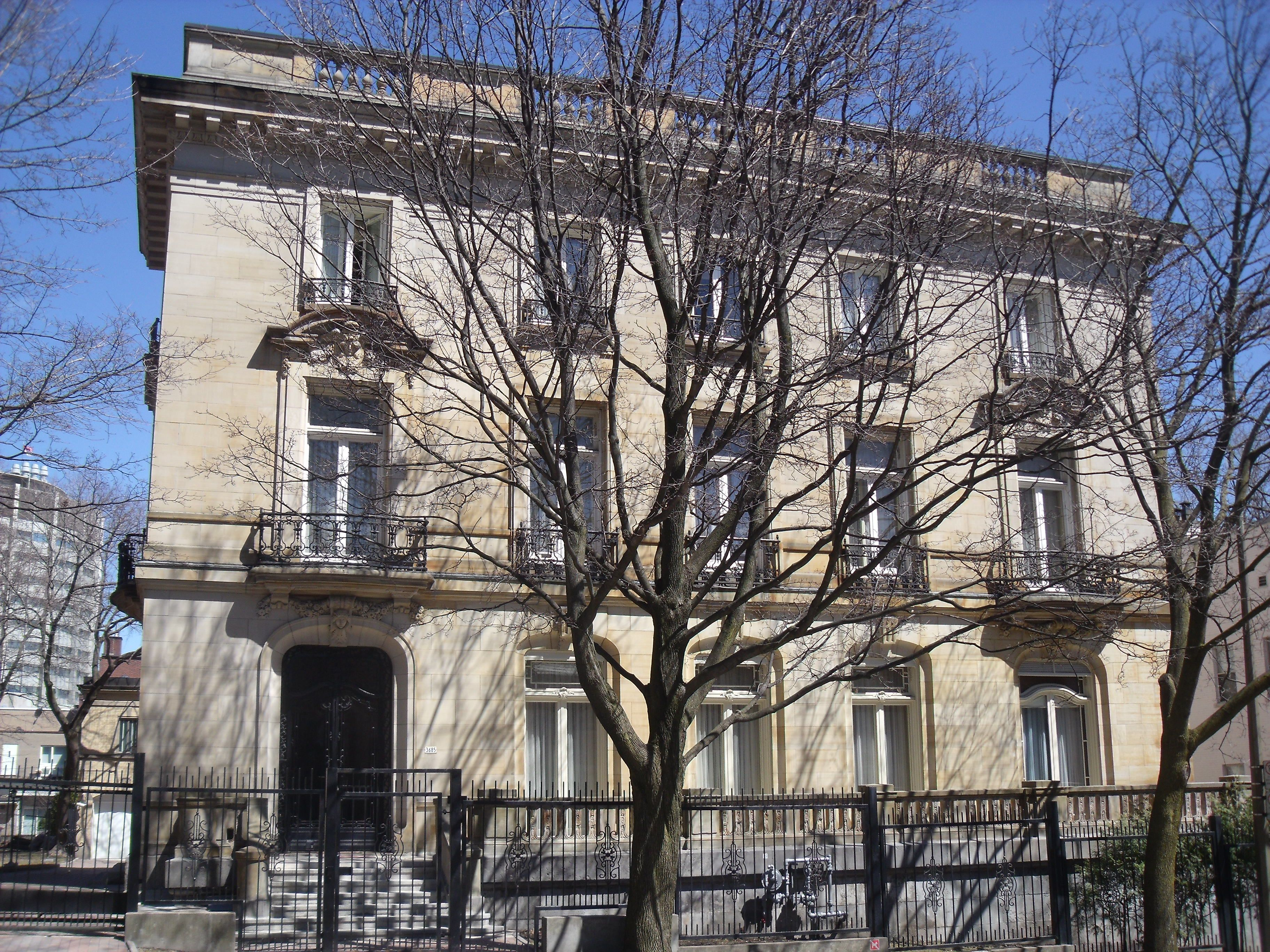
Sir Rodolphe Forget's house on Du Musée Avenue, built 1912

Following the Confederation of Canada, the mercantile elite was led by the Allan brothers (Sir Hugh and Andrew), described by the Gazette as the "pioneers of our commercial greatness". In 1878, the Marquis of Lorne and Princess Louise were posted to Canada as the new Vice-regal couple, while Montreal was attracting celebrities of the day such as Charles Dickens, Rudyard Kipling, Mark Twain and Abraham Lincoln. At the same time in London, the likes of Emma Albani and Sir Gilbert Parker were representative of Quebec's culture.

In the 1880s, the Canadian Pacific Railway was completed under the direction of Lord Mount Stephen, Lord Strathcona and R.B. Angus, after which it was continued by Lord Shaughnessy and Sir William Cornelius Van Horne. Celebrating their success, they spared no expense on their homes, with interiors decked in detailed mahogany and private art galleries housing works of the likes of Raphael, Rembrandt, Cézanne, Constable and Gainsborough etc. Van Horne's collection of Japanese pottery brought connoisseurs from Britain, the United States and Japan; and the Old Masters collection belonging to James Ross was frequently loaned out for public exhibition around the world.

Ashton Oxenden was Bishop of Montreal from 1869 to 1878. As an Englishman, previously well travelled in France, Italy, Germany, Switzerland and Spain, he paid a high complement to "this flourishing and wealthy city" when he stated that, "upon the whole, I prefer Montreal, as a place of residence, to almost any town that I have ever seen." Oxenden particularly enjoyed the "picturesque city's cheerfulness (and the) kindness of its inhabitants":

There is an abundance of charitable institutions at Montreal (and) all well managed.. among the Roman Catholics especially there are many institutions on an enormous scale.. I have hardly seen a beggar in the streets or in the country. There is a great absence of poverty, except perhaps among the lowest French population.. Happily there is at present (1871) a kindly feeling between the Roman Catholics and Protestants, each pursuing their own course without molesting the other. The general cost of living (is) much the same as in an ordinary English town.. Dinner parties are frequent in Montreal. There is perhaps a little too much expense devoted to them; and this prevents all but the wealthy from indulging in such hospitalities.

The Upper parts of the town are of more recent growth, and contain commodious and detached houses, belonging to the men of business and persons of fortune. The streets in this part of the town are as yet incomplete, showing at present certain gaps, which will ere long be filled up with handsome houses. They are all flanked by trees, chiefly maples (which) greatly add to the beauty of the town. The Montreal builders are excellent. They not only run up their houses at an indescribable speed, but they build them well and substantially.

Aside from the men at the very top, the CPR had also brought about another housing boom to the Square Mile: In 1885, Sir John Abbott, the company's chief lawyer, built his new home on Sherbrooke Street and Peel, and in doing so set a trend among his boardroom colleagues, as Oxenden had correctly predicted, filling the gaps within the Square Mile.

List of principal structures built

- Van Horne Mansion; built in 1869 for John Hamilton, President of the Merchant's Bank. In 1890, it was purchased and enlarged to 52 rooms by Sir William Cornelius Van Horne. It remained in the Van Horne family until it was controversially demolished in 1973.
- Bellevue Hall, at the foot of Bishop Street on Dorchester Street; built before 1870 for William Edmund Phillips, since demolished.
- Elmbank, off Dorchester Street; built in the 1870s for Andrew Robertson, since demolished
- John James Redpath House, Sherbrooke Street; built in 1870, demolished 1955.
- Tiffin House, Sherbrooke Street. Built in 1874, demolished in 1896.
- Burland House, University Street. Built in 1875 for George Bull Burland; designed by J.W. Hopkins. Purchased and restored by architect Claude Gagnon in 1973.
- Rokeby, Sherbrooke Street. Built 1875 for Andrew Frederick Gault, designed by James Brown. Since demolished.
- Lord Shaughnessy House, Dorchester Street; completed in 1876 by William Tutin Thomas; now the Canadian Centre for Architecture
- R.B. Angus House, Drummond Street; built in 1878, before it was demolished in 1957, it served as McGill's Conservatory of Music
- Strathcona House, off Dorchester Street; built 1879, best associated with Donald Smith, 1st Baron Strathcona and Mount Royal, demolished 1941
- Lord Mount Stephen House, Drummond Street. Built over three years (1880-1883) at a cost of $600,000, it was designed by William Tutin Thomas. In 1888, Mount Stephen retired to England and he left the house to his niece, Elsie (Stephen) Meighen, the mother of Elsie Reford. Income tax was introduced after the First World War and in 1926 the Meighens were forced to sell the property. It was purchased by three anglophone businessmen, Noah Timmins, J.H. Maher and J.S. Dohan, who two years later converted it into a private club, the Mount Stephen Club In 1975, it was designated a National Historic Sites of Canada as the best example of Renaissance Revival architecture in Canada.
- Cragruie, McGregor Street; built on a plot of ten acres of land in the 1880s for Duncan McIntyre. McIntyre's estate had extensive frontage on both Pine Avenue and Drummond Street, with a connecting right-of-way to Peel Street. The house was demolished by 1935, but the land remained under the ownership of the McIntyre family until 1947 when McIntyre's descendants (Mrs Archibald Hodgson, Mrs Lewis Reford, Mrs R.A. Snowball and Duncan McIntyre Hodgson) gave it to McGill University. The area became known as McIntyre Park, and in 1966 the McIntyre Medical Sciences Building was built upon the land.
- Louis-Joseph Forget House, Sherbrooke Street; built in 1883, now offices
- Francis Redpath House, Ontario Avenue. Built in 1885 and designed by Sir Andrew Taylor. The Sochacevski family (the present owners) began demolition in 1986 to replace it with a condominium block, despite opposition from Heritage Montreal and local citizens. The remains were razed in 2014.
- Baumgarten House, McTavish Street; built in 1887 for Baron Alfred Baumgarten. The house resembled the ancestral home of his wife, Donners Park, in Altona, Hamburg. His widow sold it to McGill in 1926 and it became the home of General Sir Arthur Currie. From 1935, it has been the McGill Faculty Club.
- Rotherwood, Redpath Street; built in 1887 for George Hague. After his death it was left empty for several years. His heirs had found taxes too heavy and could not afford to maintain the house. Unable to sell it at a decent price, it was demolished in 1929.
- Sir George Drummond's House, Sherbrooke Street, on the corner of Mansfield Street; built by Sir Andrew Taylor in 1888. It was demolished by the City of Montreal in 1930 and the site was used as a car wash.

=== 1890 to 1914 ===
From the 1890s into the Edwardian era the city enjoyed a gilded age. Stephen Leacock recalled, "the rich in Montreal enjoyed a prestige in that era that not even the rich deserve". The men of the CPR retired in the 1890s, having created "the world's greatest transportation system," selling a package of cheap land (their land holdings were equal in size to the Province of Alberta) with a cheap ticket from Britain through to the Canadian West. Together they had built a nation, seeing over a million immigrants settle in the west, and by exploiting the mineral resources included in their land grants, they and their shareholders would see their net earnings grow year on year to $46 million in 1913. Unprecedented amounts of capital now flowed in from Britain to build Western Canada, and Montreal, where every major company had its headquarters, was once again at the centre of this latest web of prosperity - "those who thought that the government of Canada was in Ottawa were mistaken, it was here".

In perhaps no section of the Colonies have Englishmen and Scotsmen made more of their opportunities than in Montreal. There is an air of prosperity about all their surroundings which at once impresses the visitor. Taken all in all, there is perhaps no wealthier city area in the world than that comprised between Beaver Hall Hill and the foot of Mount Royal, and between the parallel lines of Dorchester and Sherbrooke Streets in the West End.

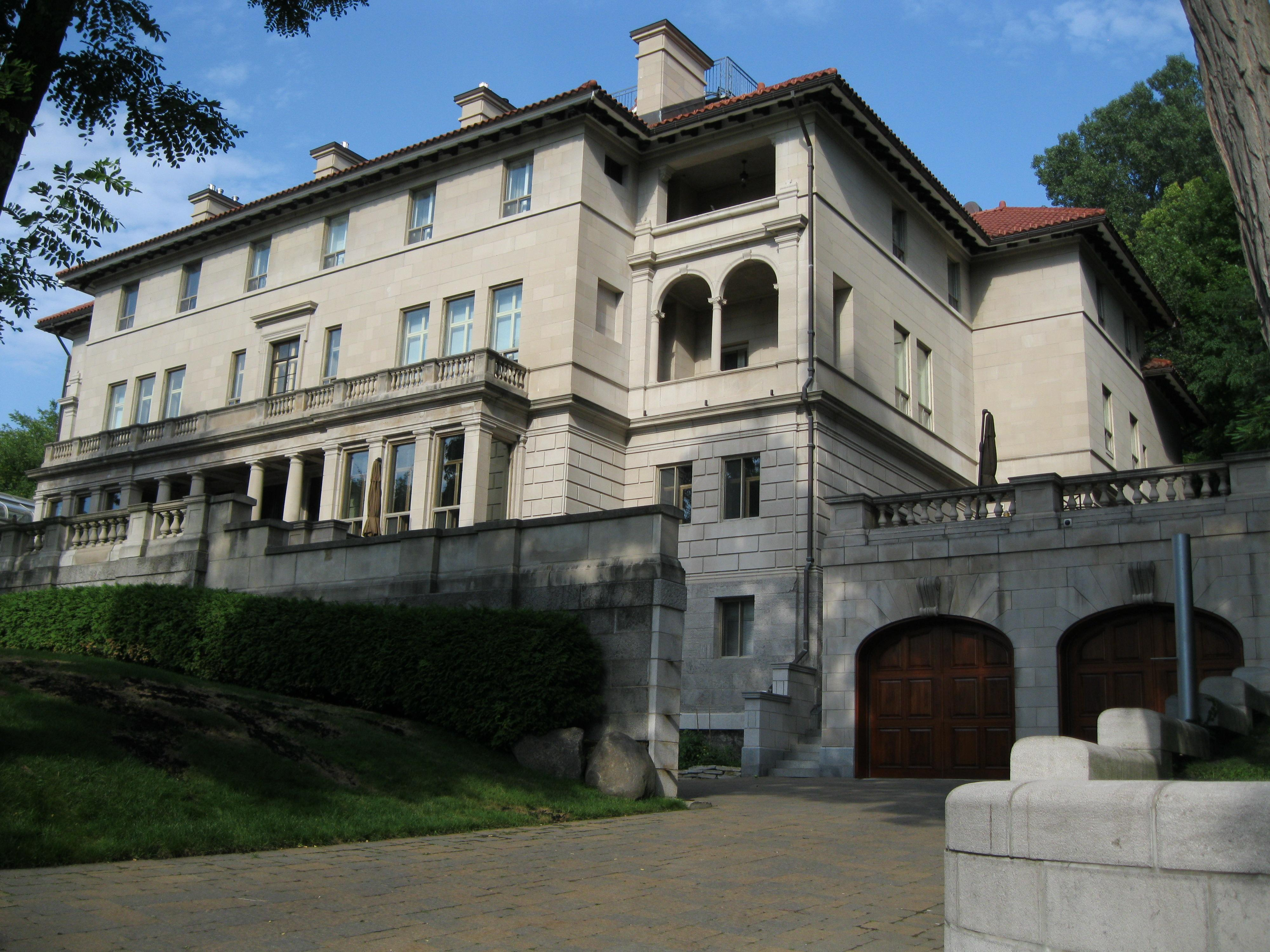
J.W. McConnell House, built in 1913, on Avenue des Pins

The wealth inherited and managed by the next generation of Square Milers continued to grow, but while many were successful as businessmen they were less entrepreneurial. They financed and worked closely with newcomers such as Sir Edward Beatty, Sir Herbert Samuel Holt and the last of the great Square Mile tycoons, J.W. McConnell. These men had easily integrated themselves into Square Mile society, but there was a new and hungrier generation of anglophones coming to Montreal, epitomised by Sir Henry Thornton, who were not as readily accepted by the older generation, which jealously guarded over the dominance of their cornerstones, the CPR and the Bank of Montreal. Notably, this new group included Max Aitken and Isaac Killam, who were 'pilled' (barred) from entry into the Mount Royal Club. In 1899, finding that the St. James' Club had become "too overcrowded," the Square Mile's leading businessmen, led by the likes of Strathcona and Angus, established the Mount Royal Club that overnight became Montreal's most prestigious. Lord Birkenhead found it to be "one of the best clubs I know in the New World, with the indefinable atmosphere about it of a good London club".

As much as the next generation spent their money on parties, new houses, grand refurbishments and summer homes, they also continued to pour money back into education, health, and culture; albeit for the most part to the benefit of Montreal's anglophone community. Giving an estimated $100 million to charity in his lifetime, McConnell followed in the magnanimous steps of some of Montreal's best remembered philanthropists, such as Lord Strathcona, to whom King Edward VII referred as "Uncle Donald" in recognition of his generosity towards charitable causes across the British Empire.

A strong British influence predominated in the Golden Square Mile during this era. This was recognised in London by increasingly frequent Royal visits. "The Union Jack flew from Ravenscrag (since inherited by Sir Montague Allan)" where the Montreal Hunt now met, and Lady Drummond was heard to reflect the sentiments of the Square Mile by stating, "the Empire is my country. Canada is my home". The best households were not always necessarily run by Canadians, but by governesses, butlers, cooks, nursemaids and maids sourced from Britain, who were used to working in large houses.

List of principal structures built

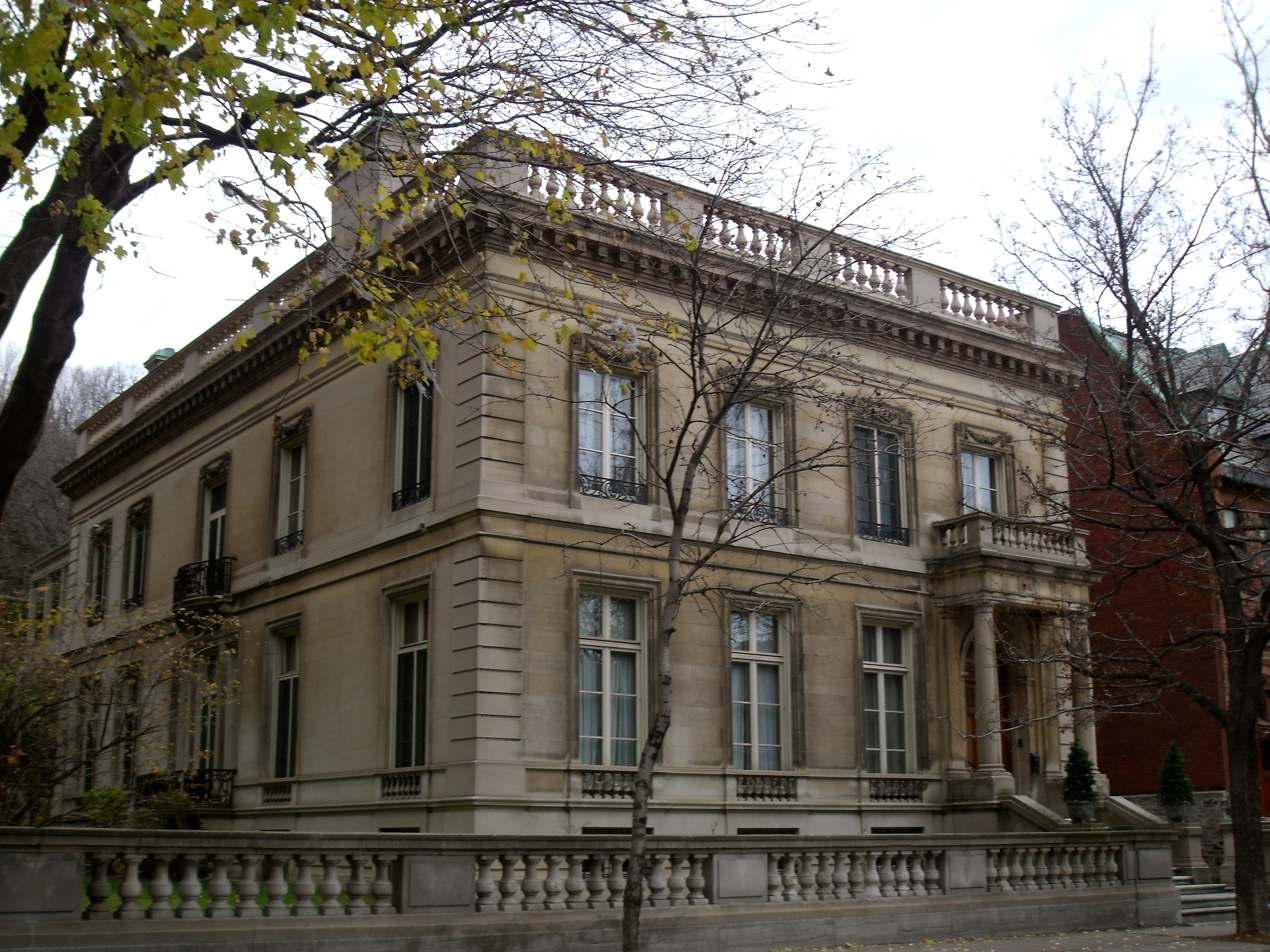
Maison of Joseph-Aldéric Raymond, on Doctor Penfield, brother of Senator Raymond, builder of Montreal Forum for the NHL

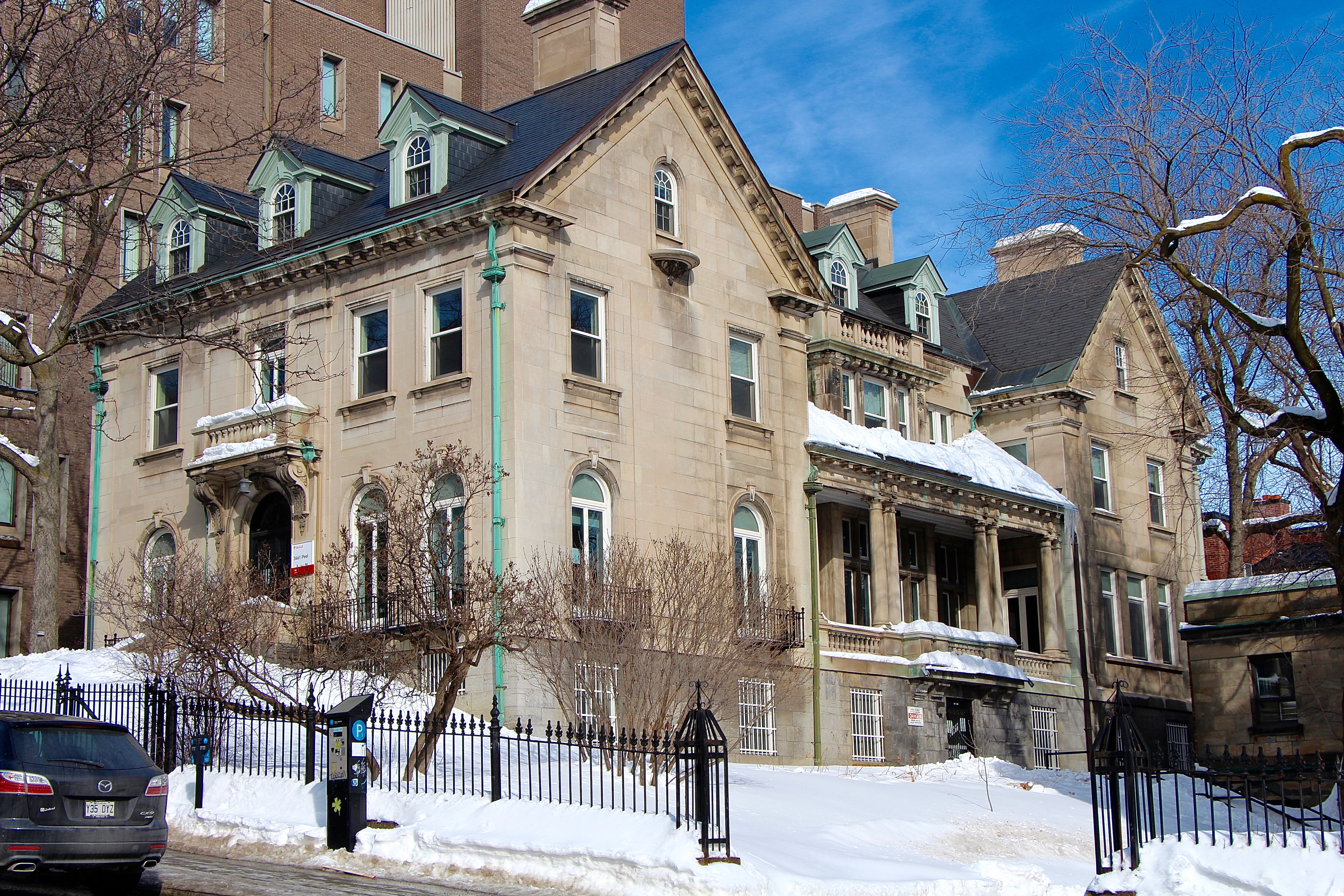
Charlotte R. Harrisson's House, Peel Street, husband was banker for Charles Meredith

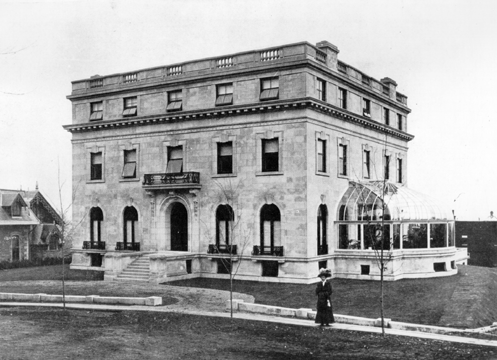
Sir Mortimer Davis's house, Pine Avenue. Built in 1907, designed by Robert Findlay

- Hector Mackenzie House, on the corner of Mountain and Sherbrooke Streets. Built 1891, designed by John Hopkins. Used as the Air Force Club during World War II, it was afterwards acquired by Standard Life and demolished in 1960 to make way for its new office tower.
- James Ross House, Peel Street. Built 1892, today McGill's Chancellor Day Hall
- Elmenhorst House, Peel Street; built in 1893, since demolished
- Ardvana, Pine Avenue. Built 1894, for Sir Vincent Meredith, 1st Bt. The land on which the house was built was formerly part of Andrew Allan's estate, and given to his youngest daughter on her marriage to Meredith. The house was designed by the Maxwell brothers and the gardens were laid out by Olmsted & Eliot. The house was enlarged again in 1906. Lady Meredith gave it to the Royal Victoria Hospital to be used a nurses residence in 1941. McGill University purchased the building in 1975, and renamed it Lady Meredith House. It was designated a National Historic Site of Canada in 1990.
- Clouston House, Peel Street. Built 1894, by the Maxwell brothers for Sir Edward Clouston, 1st Bt. The imposing Château style mansion had a round corner tower capped by a conical roof and connected by way of a loggia to a polygonal oriel. The house was finished in rough masonry of buff and red sandstone. Sculptor Henry Beaumont designed the decorative stone carvings on the exterior. Construction of the building cost $44,715. The house was demolished in 1938.
- The Gatehouse, Peel Street; built for McIntyre & Angus, 1894; now part of McGill
- Crathern House, McGregor Street. Completed in 1894 for James Crathern. Demolished 1963.
- Lord Atholstan's house, today known as Maison Alcan, Sherbrooke Street. Built in 1896, it is now designated a Quebec Historic Monument. It is a leading example of the sympathetic restoration of an old property incorporated into modern use by Alcan as their headquarters.
- Orr-Lewis House, Sherbrooke Street. Built circa 1900 for Sir Frederick Orr-Lewis, 1st Bt., later of Whitewebbs Park, near Enfield in England.
- Frederick Molson House. Built in 1901, designed by Robert Findlay. Demolished by the City of Montreal in 1957.
- Charles Hosmer House, Drummond Street. Built in 1901, now part of McGill University
- Charles Francis Smithers House, Drummond Street. Built in 1902, designed by Robert Findlay. It was an excellent example of the Tudor style with Flemish influences. The facade was illegally demolished by real estate developers in 1974. After a paying a negligible fine, in 1977 the developers were allowed to demolish the rest of the house replacing it with a high-rise apartment building.
- Robert Wilson Reford House, Drummond Street. Built in 1900, designed by Robert Findlay. Demolished in 1968.
- Charles Meredith House, Pine Avenue. Built in 1904, now part of McGill University.
- Purvis Hall, Sir Mortimer Davis's house, Pine Avenue. Built in 1907, designed by Robert Findlay. Today it is owned by McGill University and known as Purvis Hall.
- James Thomas Davis House, Drummond Street. Built by the Maxwells in 1908, it is now part of McGill University.
- Linton Apartments, Sherbrooke Street West. Built in 1908.
- Percy Cowans House, Ontario Avenue. Built by the Maxwells in 1909. The main structure survives and the house has been subdivided into apartments.
- J.K.L. Ross House, Peel Street. Built in 1910, today part of McGill University.
- Joseph-Marcellin Wilson House, Ontario Avenue. Built 1910, still standing.
- Charles G. Greenshields House, McGregor Street. Built 1911, still standing.
- Herbert Molson House, Ontario Avenue. Built in 1912, designed by Robert Findlay. It is still standing.
- Chancellor Beatty Hall, Pine Avenue. Built in 1912, by Morely Hogle for Albert Edmund Holt. Purchased by Sir Edward Beatty in 1924. Today part of McGill.
- University Club, Mansfield Street. Built 1913 to the design of Percy Nobbs.
- Sir Rodolphe Forget House, Ontario Avenue. Built in 1912, now offices.
- Charles Edward Deakin House, Redpath Crescent. Built 1913, still standing.
- Kenneth Molson House, Pine Avenue, at the top of Mountain Street. Built in 1914, the house of 47 rooms stood six storeys high and was complete with an elevator and a built-in vacuum cleaning system. There were seven master bedrooms, four bathrooms, a conservatory, a Billiard room and a Rifle range. There was a verandah on every floor, including one for the servants, and a two-car garage with chauffeur's quarters. It was demolished after 1938.
- Edmund Graves Meredith Cape House, Redpath Crescent. Built 1914, still standing.
- Frederick Beardmore House, Pine Avenue. Built in 1914, afterwards purchased by Sir Henry Worth Thornton. Still standing.
- J.W. McConnell House. Built in 1914, for Colonel Jeffrey Hale Burland, afterwards purchased by McConnell. One of the very few which remains a private house.

=== World War I ===
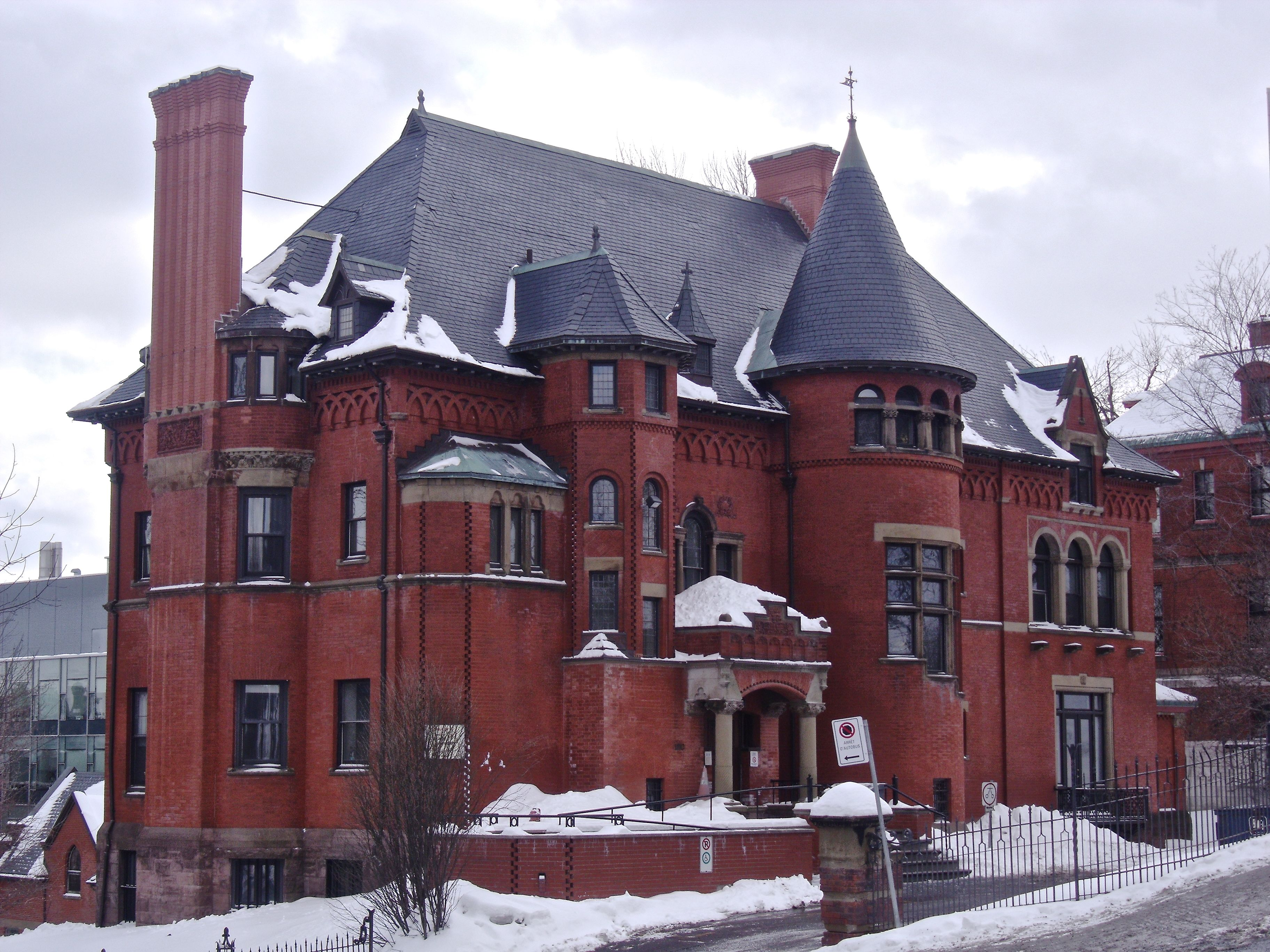
Sir Vincent and Lady Meredith converted their home, Ardvana (above), into a rehabilitation centre for Canadian soldiers returning from the Front

The men associated with the Beaver Club, the predecessors of the Square Milers, had almost all served in the Canadian Militia and on the outbreak of the First World War the next generation did not hesitate to take up arms. At his own expense, Hamilton Gault raised Princess Patricia's Canadian Light Infantry, the last privately raised regiment in the British Empire. He was injured three times leading his regiment into battle, and even after losing a leg he still returned to the Front. Lord Strathcona's Horse, raised by that Canadian peer for the Boer War, was once again returned to action. The British Prime Minister David Lloyd George claimed to his biographer that had the war continued into 1919, he would have sought to replace Field Marshal Douglas Haig with the Square Mile's General Sir Arthur Currie.

The Ladies of the Square Mile raised money for the troops and some like Lady Meredith, the Gaults and the Baumgartens opened their houses to injured soldiers returning from Europe. The personal services in England of the Canadian Red Cross were under the charge of Lady Julia Drummond who saw that each Canadian soldier returned to an English hospital received a visit offering sympathy and supplying any basic needs. When Martha Allan trained as a nurse and bought an ambulance which she drove in France, her mother was inspired to set up a hospital in England for Canadian soldiers.

Economically, Montreal would emerge from the war nearly unscathed, due in a large part to the steady hand of the president of the Bank of Montreal, Sir Vincent Meredith. In 1919, fifty families were said to have controlled a third of Canada's invested wealth, and the great majority of them were based in Montreal.

=== The end of an era ===
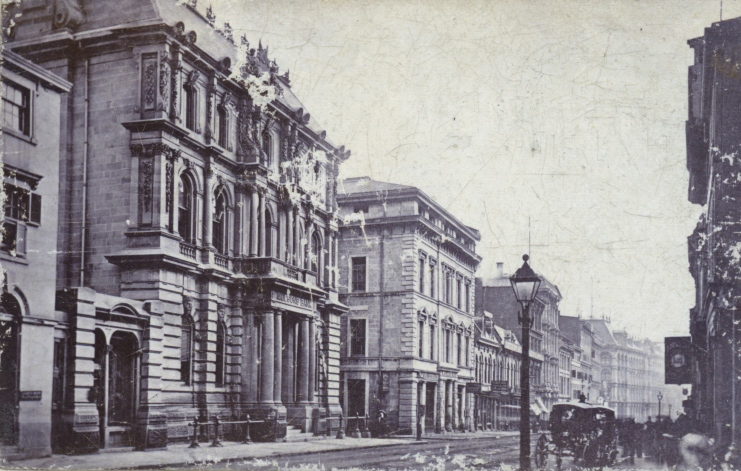
The Molson Bank on St. James Street, Montreal, in 1872

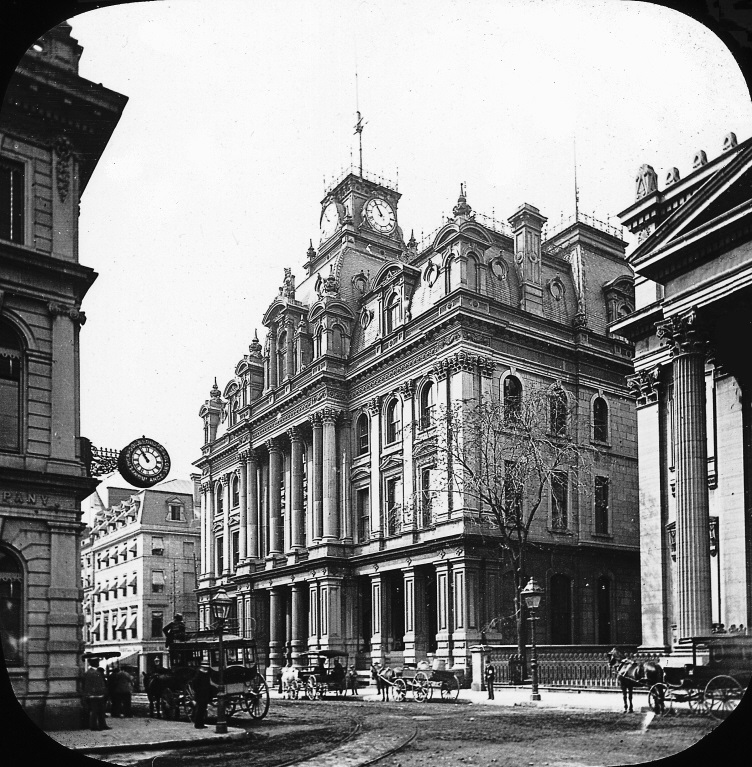
St. James Street, the financial centre of Montreal at its peak in 1895

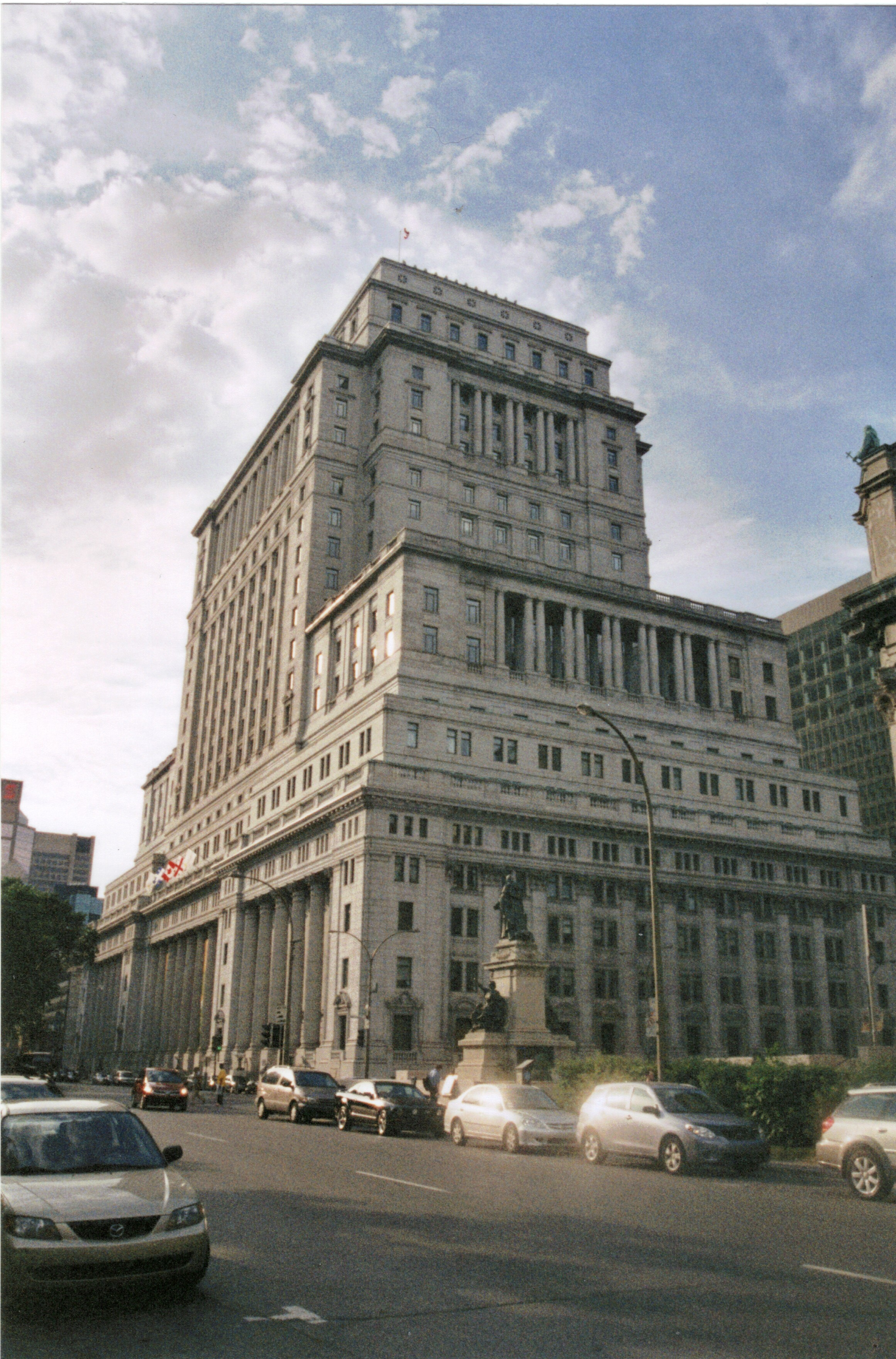
Built in 1931, the Sun Life Building on Dorchester Square was in its time the largest edifice in the British Empire

The Square Mile had reached its peak in the Edwardian era, both in spirit and substance. What followed was a steady decline as aggressive American-style corporations took control of the family businesses whose origins laid with the Scots-Quebecers and the Beaver Club. "New money" swept into Montreal from the United States, Western Canada and, such as the Bronfman family, from different ethnic backgrounds. Similarly to the Canadiens of the Ancien Régime a century before, the Square Milers with their old-fashioned British ideals and business principles did not adapt to the changes in society and held themselves aloof. Newcomers, who neither knew nor cared about the old guard and their traditions, were more often than not barred from entry into Square Mile society (such as membership to Montreal's most prestigious men's club, the Mount Royal), but this only served to further alieniate the declining enclave.

Changing attitudes, the war, the introduction of income tax and the invasion of commerce in the streets below Sherbrooke all played their part in the decline. The Wall Street Crash of 1929 affected a great number of Square Milers, though not as badly as it did their American counterparts. Art collections were sold and some tried to sell their houses, but there were no takers. The J.K.L. Ross House was sold for $50,000 in 1930, only a few years after it had been valued at $1 million. Those who had relied on investments moved to smaller, more heat-efficient houses in Westmount or took apartments at the Ritz-Carlton Montreal, whereas others like Sir Herbert Samuel Holt, who never dealt on margin, emerged untouched.

The Great Depression in Canada during the 1930s fueled the Quebec nationalist movement and set the course for the Quiet Revolution. The social divide between anglophone employers and French Canadian workers in Quebec had existed for a long time, but the economic turmoil of the Great Depression led to calls for change from the status quo. For the next four decades the Union Nationale government, with the support of the Catholic Church, dominated Quebec politics, undermining anglophone domination.

In 1977, the newly elected Parti Québécois (PQ) government passed the Charter of the French Language (known as Bill 101), making the use of French language mandatory for medium and large-scale companies when communicating with French-speaking staff. This law, the election of the PQ, and the threat of Quebec independence caused instability in the province's business environment, and accelerated the move of some companies' headquarters from Montreal to other Canadian cities, including Calgary and Toronto. Some companies remained in Montreal, including the Montreal Exchange and North America's oldest brewery Molsons, but others moved their headquarters elsewhere, such as the Bank of Montreal, Sun Life Financial, the Royal Trust and The Guarantee Company of North America. Toronto had surpassed Montreal as the financial capital of Canada in 1934, and the move of these companies out of Montreal marked the end of an era.

== Demolition ==
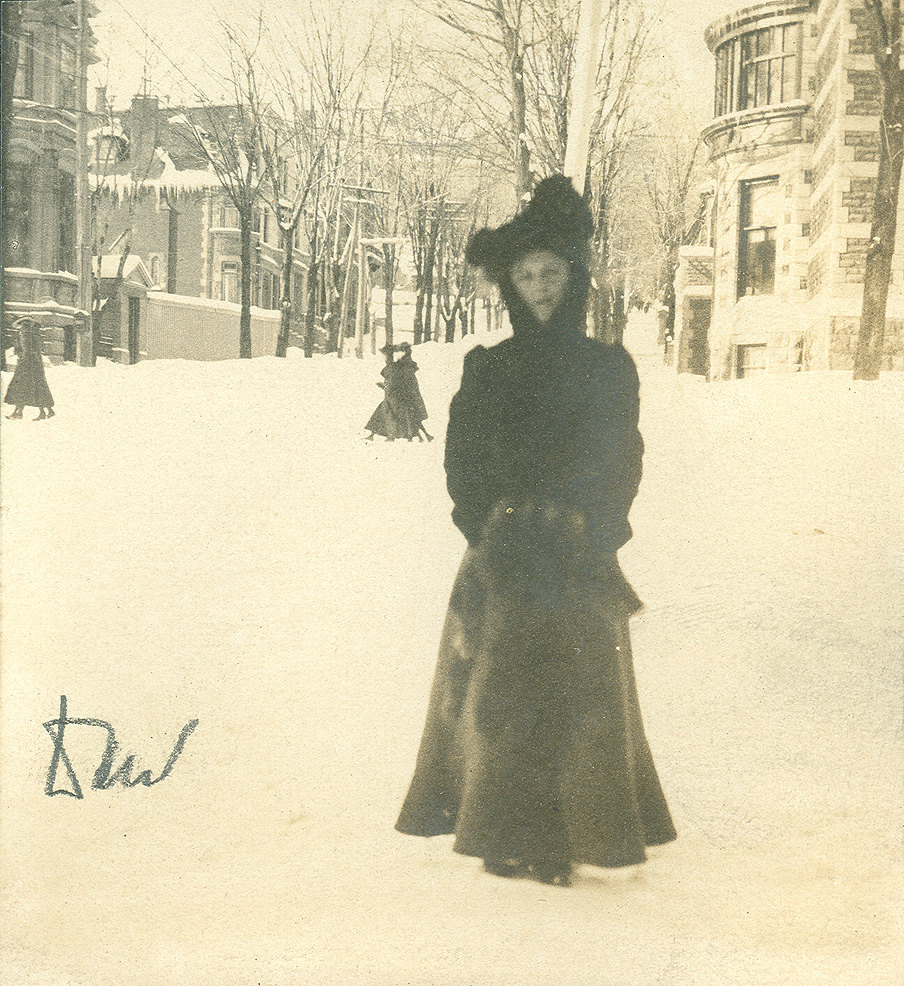
Marjory Clouston on Sherbrooke Street with Drummond Street leading up to Mount Royal behind her, 1902

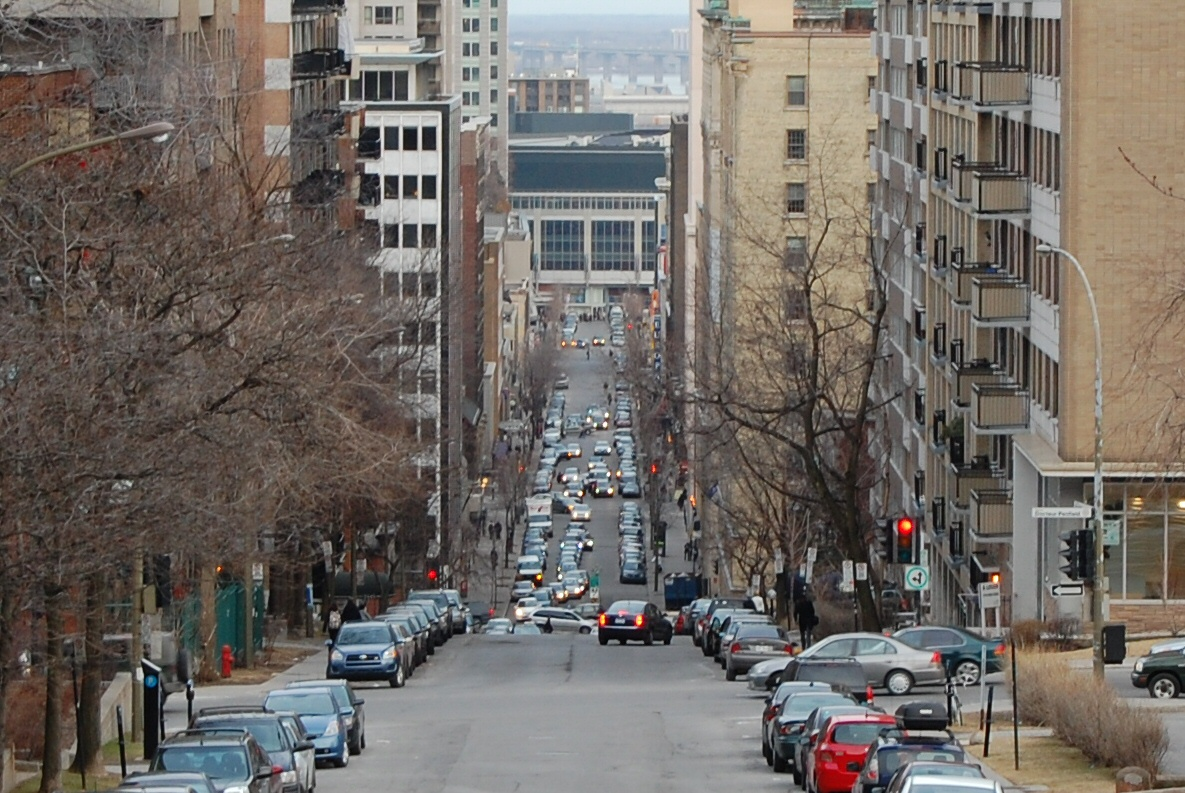
Drummond Street in 2009, looking down from Mount Royal towards Sherbrooke

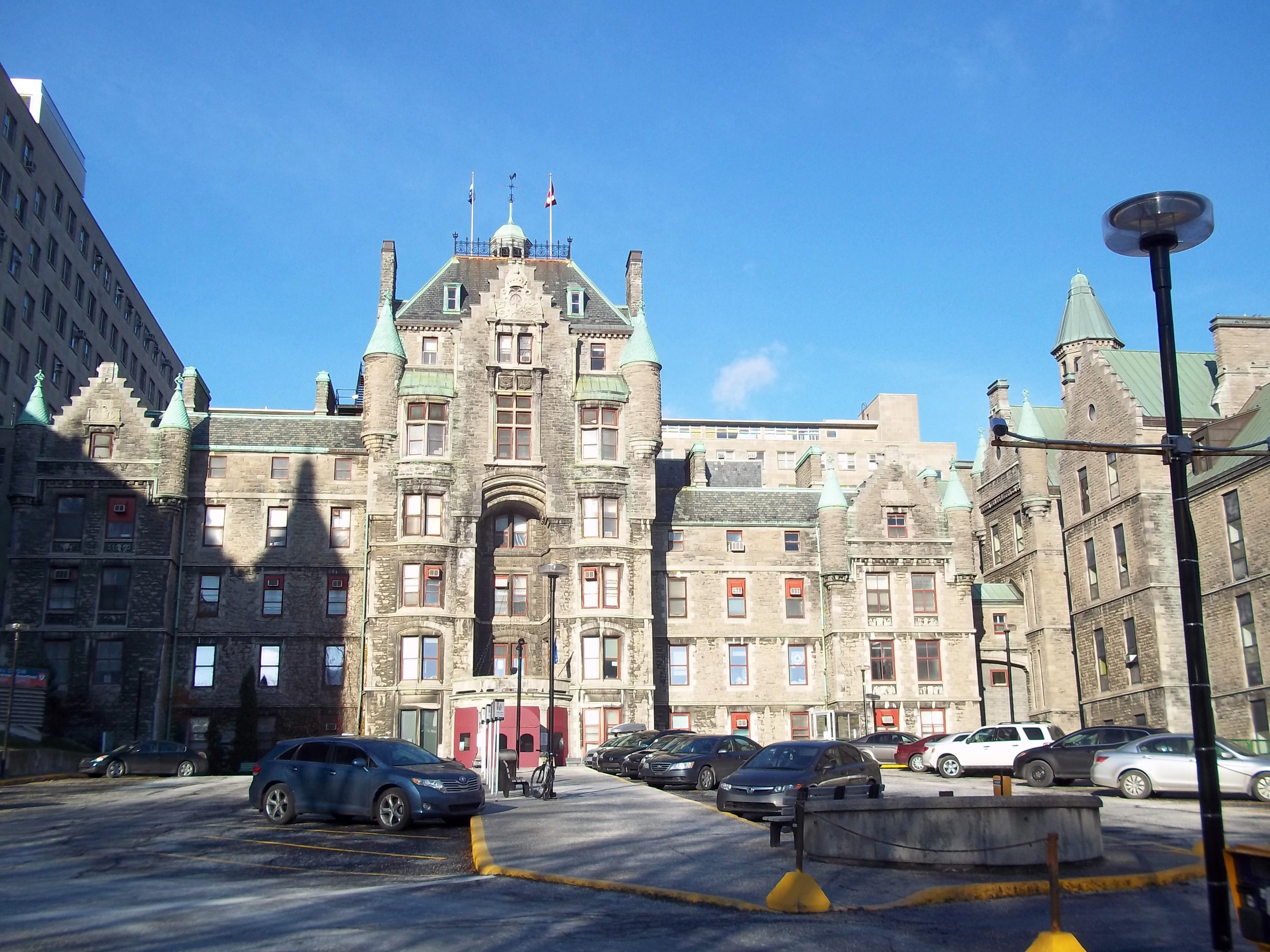
The Royal Victoria Hospital could soon be sold to real estate developers contravening the caveat that the land be used for hospitals only

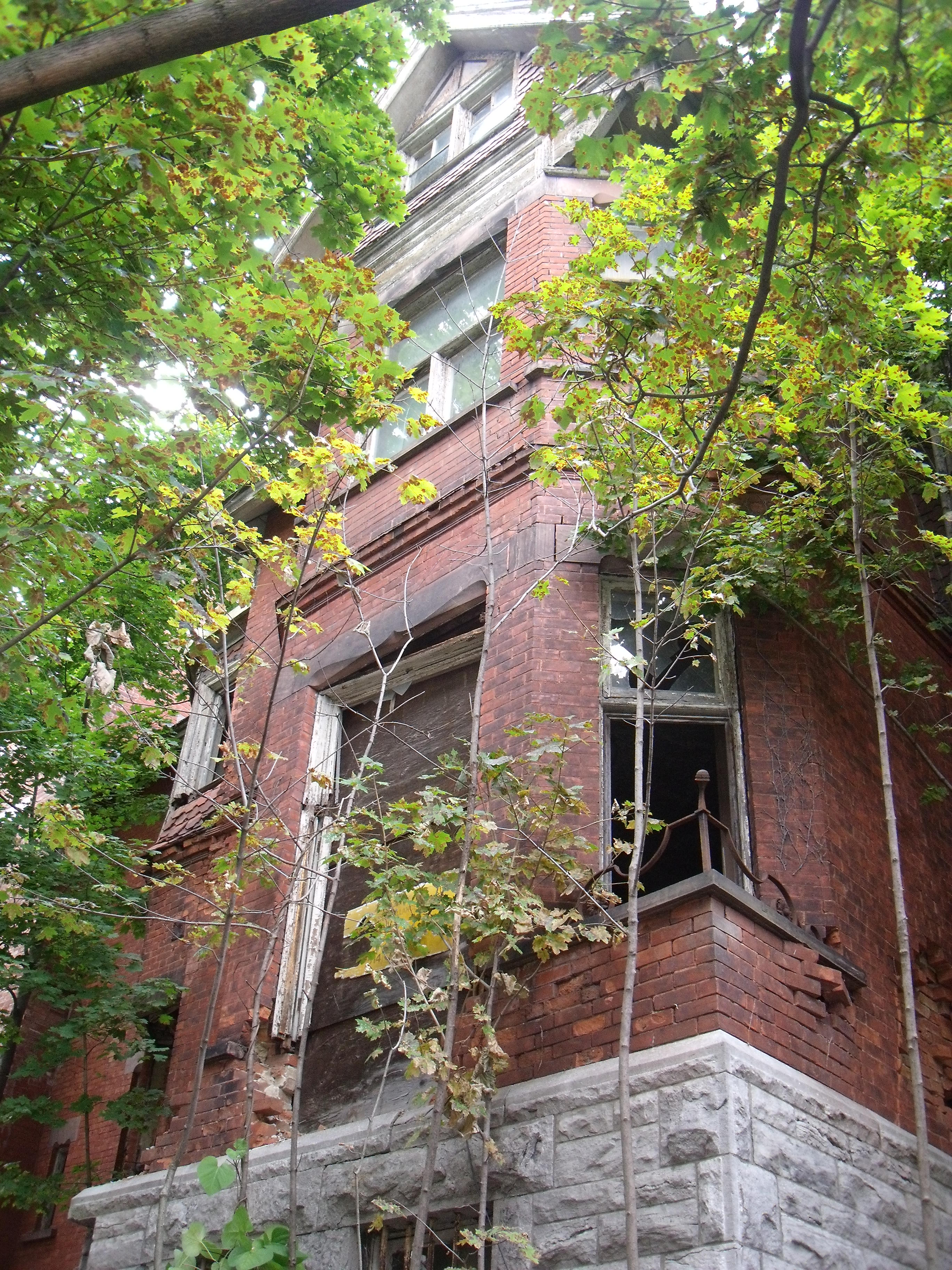
The Sochaczevski family bought Francis Redpath House in 1986, with intention to demolish it, and despite signing an agreement to maintain it, allowed the house fall into disrepair over the course of 28 years. It was demolished in 2014.

By the end of World War II, the homes within the Square Mile were for the most part left empty or only partially occupied. Montreal's central business district had shifted northwest toward Sherbrooke Street, in the area of the Square Mile. From 1945 to 1965, many of the great mansions were acquired by commercial and civic institutions and demolished or repurposed beyond all recognition.

The majority of the mansions were demolished and replaced with high-rise office or residential developments, but some two dozen other homes were also transformed into university or commercial offices. Ravenscrag was left by Sir Montague and Lady Allan to the Royal Victoria Hospital in 1942. The sumptuous residence was converted into the Allan Memorial Institute, and McGill University used its fourteen acres of grounds to erect subsidiary buildings.

Some demolitions were controversial. The Van Horne Mansion, the centre of Square Mile society since the 1930s was demolished by promoter David Azrieli in 1973, igniting a vigorous public debate regarding conservation of historical buildings, and the reasons for which a building should be preserved. The demolition of the Van Horne mansion led to the establishment of Heritage Montreal to protect historic buildings at the provincial level. The architectural character of the neighbourhood stabilized, but the original Square Mile as it had been had already changed beyond recognition.

== Prospect of further demolition ==
Modern architecture has emphasised the integration of older buildings with new developments. An example is Maison Alcan, formerly the home of Lord Atholstan, which became the headquarters of Alcan in the early 1980s. Another example is Lady Meredith House, home to McGill's Centre for Medicine, Ethics and Law, which was broken into and set on fire in the 1990s. McGill subsequently renovated and retrofitted the old house to its original elegance, hiring Julia Gersovitz, a McGill graduate and professor. However, threats to the built heritage of the Square Mile remain.

=== Royal Victoria Hospital ===
The buildings formerly occupied by the Royal Victoria Hospital and the remaining property on which they stand have been empty since 2015, when the hospital itself moved into the new 'McGill Superhospital' in the Glen Yards. The Royal Vic, a veritable Montreal landmark, has been expanded several times since it was built in 1893, and the changes have never before been cause for concern. In 1891, the public-spirited Lords Mount Stephen and Strathcona purchased the land and gave the necessary funds to the City of Montreal for which to build the hospital. However, they attached a caveat to their donation, stating that the land and its buildings must only ever be used for education and healing.

From 2010, Elspeth Angus (born in 1929), a descendant of R.B. Angus and an heir as the grand-niece of Lord Mount Stephen, has been fighting to maintain not just the wishes but the conditions set down by the founders to the city, and find use for the land and its buildings as a research facility. Heritage Montreal are also supporting her in her efforts. In 2014, McGill University released a proposal for the integration of the site into the McGill campus.

=== Francis Redpath Mansion ===
Built in 1886, it was designed by the noted architect Sir Andrew Taylor and was one of the last of his residential projects still standing in the city. In 1986, the Sochaczevski family, the new owners of Francis Redpath's house, began demolition in order to replace it with yet another a vista-changing condominium block. A portion of the house was destroyed before a court injunction was taken out and its destruction was temporarily halted.

In 2001, Mayor Pierre Bourque granted immediate demolition of the house. In 2002, following intervention by Heritage Montreal, Projet Montréal and local citizens, the Commission d'arbitrage de la Ville de Montréal refused the demolition permit granted by the Bourque administration, on the grounds of the solidity of the house and reminding the owner of his obligation to keep it in good condition—the Sochaczevski family had signed an agreement with the Montreal City Council to maintain the house when they bought it in 1986, but did nothing to maintain, protect or stabilize it.

As a mayoral candidate, Gérald Tremblay portrayed himself as a defender of the Redpath house and heritage buildings, but as soon as he gained office—strongly backed by The Suburban newspaper, owned by the Sochaczevski family—he considered a plan to allow demolition to continue. He withdrew his support after the Montreal Museum of Fine Arts stepped in to object.

In December 2013, Mayor Denis Coderre approved the final demolition permit, to be carried out in February 2014. It was demolished on March 19, 2014, just two weeks after Quebec Culture and Communications Minister Maka Kotto intervened to order a halt to the mansion's demolition, in accordance with the Cultural Heritage Act, the Court intervened—at the owner's request—to shorten the period granted in the minister's order. Heritage Montreal expressed regret that the discussions were limited to the owner and the minister, not the community nor municipal authorities. After these talks with the owner, Kotto concluded that Redpath House "does not present a national heritage interest," and gave the go ahead for it to be torn down to make for way for the promoter's development.

== Institutions associated with the Golden Square Mile ==
The Square Milers built and funded various Montreal institutions including:

- McGill University
- Royal Victoria Hospital
- Montreal General Hospital
- McCord Museum
- Montreal Museum of Fine Arts
- Mount Royal Park
- Mount Royal Cemetery
- Campbell Concerts and Parks
- Ritz-Carlton Hotel
- Redpath Library
- Redpath Museum
- Allan Memorial Institute
- Molson Stadium
- Royal Montreal Curling Club
- Montreal Forum
- Montreal Rackets Club
- Montreal Snow Shoe Club
- Montreal Lacrosse Club
- Mount Royal Club
- Royal Montreal Golf Club
- Montreal Victorias
- Montreal AAA
- Montreal Winter Carnival
- Mount Royal Tennis Club
- Saint James's Club of Montreal
- Victoria Skating Rink.

== See also ==
- Beaver Club
- Bridle Path in Toronto
- Canadian Peers and Baronets
- Royal Victoria Hospital, Montreal
- Bishop's College School
- 1901 Redpath Mansion murders
