= List of Scottish Canadians =

The following is a list of notable Scottish Canadians.

== List ==
- H. Montagu Allan (1860–1951), banker, ship owner, sportsman
- Hugh Allan (1810–1882), financier and shipping magnate
- Richard B. Angus (1831-1922), banker and philanthropist
- Drew Arnott, singer/songwriter and musician
- Frederick Grant Banting (1891-1941), medical scientist, physician and painter, co-discoverer of insulin, 1923 Nobel Prize in Physiology or Medicine
- Alexander Graham Bell (1847–1922), eminent scientist, credited with inventing the first practical telephone
- John Bethune (1751-1815), founded the first Presbyterian Church in Montreal
- Norman Bethune (1890–1939), medical innovator and supporter of the Chinese Communist Revolution
- Bill Blaikie, former Member of Parliament (MP), deputy leader of the New Democratic Party and Deputy Speaker of the House of Commons of Canada
- Daniel Blaikie, Member of Parliament (MP) of the New Democratic Party
- Rebecca Blaikie, former president of the New Democratic Party
- George Brown (1818–1880), founder of the Toronto Globe, Father of Confederation and first de facto leader of the Liberal Party of Canada
- James Cameron, film director and producer
- Douglas Campbell (1922-2009), stage actor
- Gordon Campbell, Premier of British Columbia
- Kim Campbell, first female prime minister of Canada
- Neve Campbell, actress (Scottish father)
- John Candy (1950–1994), actor and comedian, father was of Scottish descent
- Wilf Carter (1904-1996), Nova Scotia-born country musician
- Jim Carrey, actor and comedian (his mother is Scottish Canadian from the Gordon Clan))
- James Cockburn (1819-1883), first Speaker of the House in Canada (Conservative Party)
- William Davidson (1740-1790), pioneer settler in New Brunswick
- Stu Davis (1921–2007), singer/songwriter, radio and television performer aka Canada's Cowboy Troubadour (b. David Alexander Stewart)
- John William Dawson (1820–1899), scientist, educator
- Richard Dobie (1731–1805), fur trader, businessman
- Sir James Douglas (1803-1877), chief factor of the HBC's Columbia District (1843–1858) and Governor of the colonies of the Colony of Vancouver Island (1851–64) and the Colony of British Columbia (1858–62)
- Tommy Douglas (1904–1986), Premier of Saskatchewan and first leader of the New Democratic Party
- Shirley Douglas (1934-2000), actress (daughter of Tommy Douglas)
- William Dow (1800–1868), brewer and businessman
- George Alexander Drummond (1829–1910), businessman and senator
- Timothy Eaton (1834-1907), founded Eaton's (Scottish ancestry)
- David Ewart (1841-1921), Chief Dominion Architect
- Sandford Fleming (1827–1915), railway engineer and proponent of standard time zones
- Simon Fraser (1776–1862), Northwest Company trader and explorer
- John Kenneth Galbraith (1908–2006), Ontario, California and Massachusetts academic and economist, U.S. and Canadian diplomat
- Alexander Tilloch Galt (1817–1893), politician and a Father of Confederation (father was of Scottish ancestry)
- Charles Blair Gordon (1867–1939), industrialist and banker, president of the Bank of Montreal
- Donald Gordon (1904-1969), Chairman, Wartime Prices and Trade Board, Chairman and President, Canadian National Railways, builder of Churchill Falls
- Ryan Gosling, actor and musician
- Laurie Gough, Canadian-American travel writer
- Hugh Graham (1848–1938), newspaper publisher
- George Monro Grant (1835-1902), President of the Royal Society of Canada
- Iain Hume, Canadian international football (soccer) player
- Michael Ironside, actor and voice actor
- Ted Irvine, ice hockey player
- Chris Jericho, professional wrestler and singer
- Alexander Keith, (1795-1873) brewer (Alexander Keith's Brewery)
- William Lyon Mackenzie King (1874–1950), longest-serving prime minister of Canada
- Kaylyn Kyle, Canadian soccer player of Scottish descent
- Avril Lavigne, Canadian singer-songwriter, mother of Scottish descent
- Grace Annie Lockhart (1855-1916), first woman in the British Empire to graduate from university (May 25, 1875)
- Angus MacAskill (1825-1863), tallest non-pathological person
- J. E. H. MacDonald (1873–1932), painter, member of the Group of Seven
- John MacDonald of Glenaladale (1742-1810), colonist
- John A. Macdonald (1815-1891), first Prime Minister of Canada
- John Sandfield Macdonald (1812-1872), first Premier of Ontario
- Norm Macdonald (1959-2021), stand-up comedian, writer and actor of Irish and Scottish descent
- Rodney MacDonald, former premier of Nova Scotia
- William Christopher Macdonald (1831-1917), tobacco manufacturer and philanthropist
- Peter MacKay, Minister of National Defence
- Robert Mackay (1840–1916), businessman and statesman
- Sir Alexander MacKenzie (1764–1820) Northwest Company trader and explorer
- Alexander Mackenzie (1822-1892), second Prime Minister of Canada
- William Lyon Mackenzie (1795-1861), journalist and politician
- Colin Francis MacKinnon (1851-1877), founded St. Francis Xavier College, which grew into St. Francis Xavier University
- Alistair MacLeod (1936-2014), writer, recipient of the Order of Canada
- Kevin S. MacLeod, current Canadian Secretary to the Queen
- David MacNaughton, ambassador and businessman
- Peter MacNeill, actor
- Agnes Macphail (1890-1954), first woman seated into the House of Commons of Canada
- Abraham Martin (1589-1664), St. Lawrence River pilot
- Eric McCormack, award-winning Canadian actor, television producer and writer, best known for his role as Will Truman in the American sitcom Will & Grace
- John McDermott, vocal tenor with Irish roots
- William McDougall (1822-1905), one of the Fathers of Confederation
- Todd McFarlane, comic book writer, filmmaker and entrepreneur
- James McGill (1744–1813), fur trader and merchant
- Peter McGill (1789–1860), businessman and politician
- William McGillivray (1764–1825), fur trader
- Gavin McInnes (born 1970), writer, actor, comedian, commentator, co-founder of Vice Media and Vice Magazine
- Duncan McIntyre (1834–1894), businessman
- Sarah McLachlan, singer-songwriter and musician
- Beverley McLachlin, Chief Justice of Canada
- Norman McLaren (1914–1987), film animation pioneer
- Tara MacLean, singer-songwriter
- Marshall McLuhan (1911–1980), communication and media theorist
- Bobby McMahon, football analyst for Fox Soccer Channel
- Craig McMorris, snowboarding
- Mark McMorris, snowboarding
- Anna Mcnulty, YouTuber
- Tate McRae, singer-songwriter and dancer.
- Simon McTavish (1750–1804), fur trader, sawmill and flour mill operator
- Colin Mochrie, actor and comedian
- Henry Morgan (1819–1893), built the first department store in Canada
- Donald Morrow (1908-1995), Ontario politician, soldier and teacher
- Farley Mowat (1921-2014), author, Scottish ancestry
- Oliver Mowat (1820-1903), third Premier of Ontario
- Alice Munro, Nobel laureate author and short story writer
- George Murdoch (1850-1910), first mayor of Calgary
- James Murray (1721-1794), first civil governor of the Province of Quebec
- Anne Murray, singer and entertainer
- James Naismith (1861-1939), inventor of basketball
- Alexander Walker Ogilvie (1829–1902), miller and statesman
- Roddy Piper (1954–2015), WWE wrestler and actor
- Christopher Plummer (1929-2021), Academy Award-winning actor
- Francine Racette, actress
- John Redpath (1796–1869), contractor and industrialist
- Peter Redpath (1821–1894), businessman and philanthropist
- Callum Keith Rennie, actor
- John Robertson (1934-2014), sports journalist, covered Expos and Blue Jays, and coined the term "Rider Pride" (son of Scots immigrant)
- Robert W. Service, poet
- Bernie Shaw, lead singer of rock band Uriah Heep since 1986
- George Simpson (1787–1860), executive and fur trader
- Donald Smith, 1st Baron Strathcona and Mount Royal (1820-1914)
- Dayne St. Clair, professional soccer player, Scottish-Canadian mother
- George Stephen, 1st Baron Mount Stephen (1829-1921)
- Arran Stephens, founder of Nature's Path Foods
- David Stirling (1822–1887), architect; associate architect of the Royal Canadian Academy of Arts
- Daniel Sutherland (1756–1832), businessman and politician
- Donald Sutherland, actor
- Kiefer Sutherland, actor (grandson of NDP leader Tommy Douglas, who was born in Scotland)
- Rossif Sutherland, actor
- Nick Suzuki, ice hockey player
- Ryan Suzuki, ice hockey player
- Tamara Taylor, actress
- Dave Thomas (born 1949), actor and comedian, Scottish-born mother
- Ian Thomas (born 1950), singer-songwriter and actor, Scottish-born mother
- William Fraser Tolmie (1812-1886), member of the Legislative Assembly of British Columbia
- Justin Trudeau, 23rd Prime Minister of Canada (his mother, Margaret, is daughter of Scots immigrant Jimmy Sinclair)
- Pierre Trudeau (1919–2000), 15th Prime Minister of Canada (his mother, Grace Elliott, was of Scottish ancestry)
- Tessa Virtue, Olympian ice dancer
- Johnny Reid (born 1974), songwriter and recording artist

== See also ==
- Scottish diaspora
- Scottish placenames in Canada
- Scots-Quebecer
- Anglo-Métis
- English Canadians
- European Canadians
- Scottish people
- Scottish Americans
- Ulster-Scottish Canadians
- Celtic music in Canada
- Glengarry Highland Games
