= Redpath =

Redpath may refer to:

== Businesses ==
- Redpath Motor Vehicle Company, a former Canadian automaker
- Redpath Sugar, a Canadian sugar refining company

== People ==
- Redpath (surname), a list of people with the surname Redpath

== Places ==
- Redpath, Scottish Borders, a village in the Scottish Borders, Scotland
- Redpath Hall, McGill University's first library building
- 1901 Redpath Mansion murders
- Redpath Museum, a museum at McGill University
- Redpath Sugar Refinery, Toronto, Canada
- Redpath Township, Traverse County, Minnesota, United States

== See also ==
- Red Path, a 2024 drama movie
