= Drummond Street (Montreal) =

Thoroughfare in Montreal, Canada

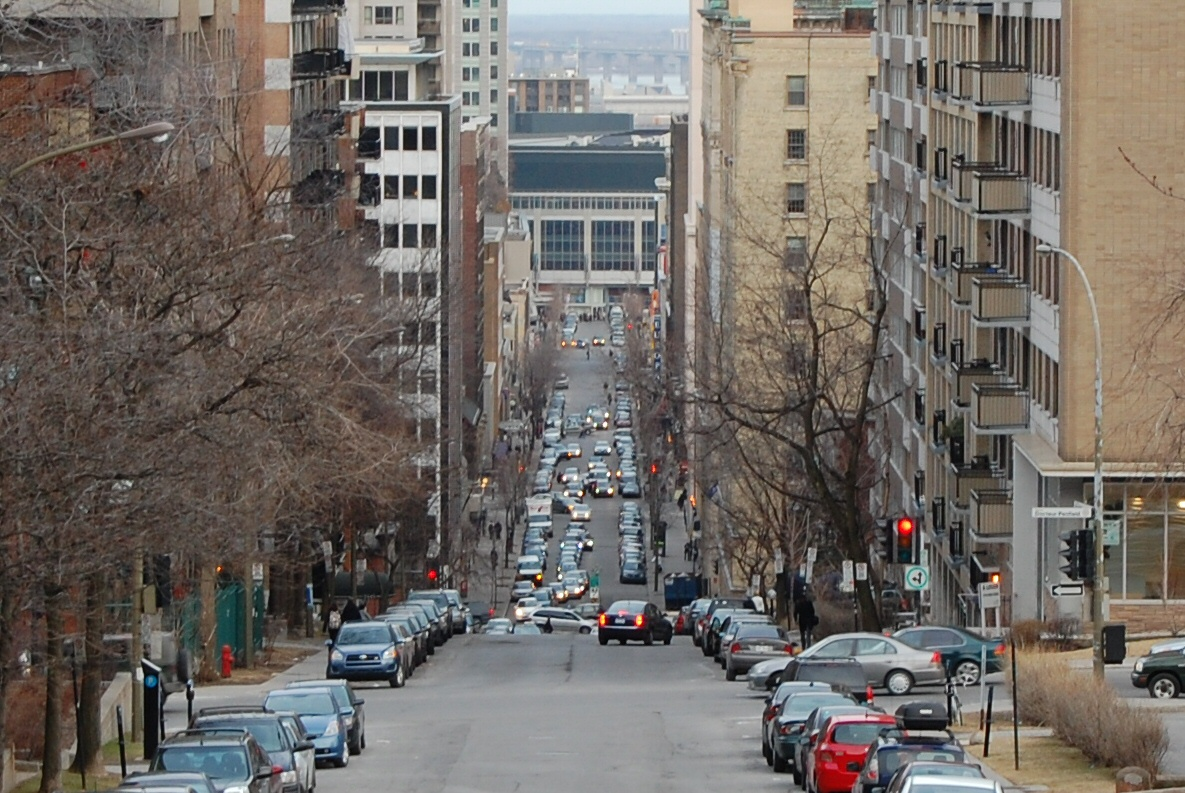
- Drummond Street looking southward.
- Interactive map of Drummond Street
- Native name: Rue Drummond (French)
- Length: 1.2 km (0.75 mi)
- Location: Between Doctor Penfield Avenue and De la Gauchetière Street
- Coordinates: 45.499068°N 73.575152°W

Construction
- Inauguration: 1842

Drummond Street (officially rue Drummond) is a north–south street located in downtown Montreal, Quebec, Canada. Spanning a total of 1.2 kilometres, it links Doctor Penfield Avenue in the north and De la Gauchetière Street in the south.

A mix of businesses are located on this street such as bookstores, pubs and restaurants. A branch of the YMCA and George Stephen House, the final location of the Mount Stephen Club, are also on this street.

== History ==
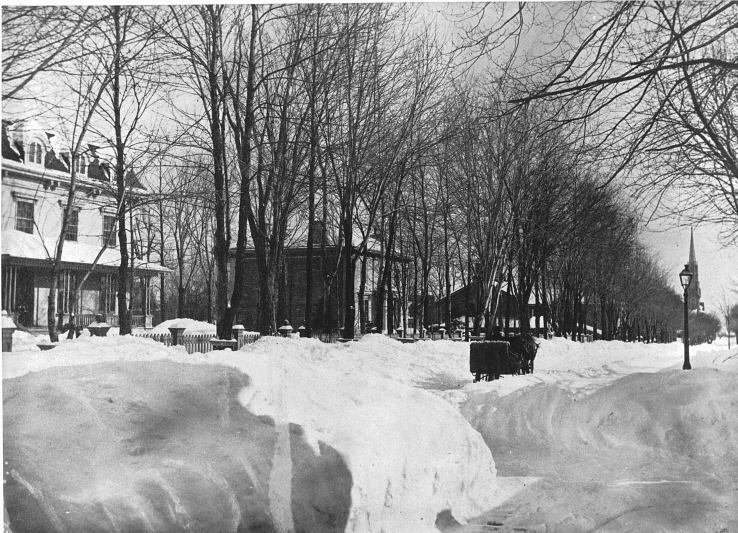
Drummond Street, 1879

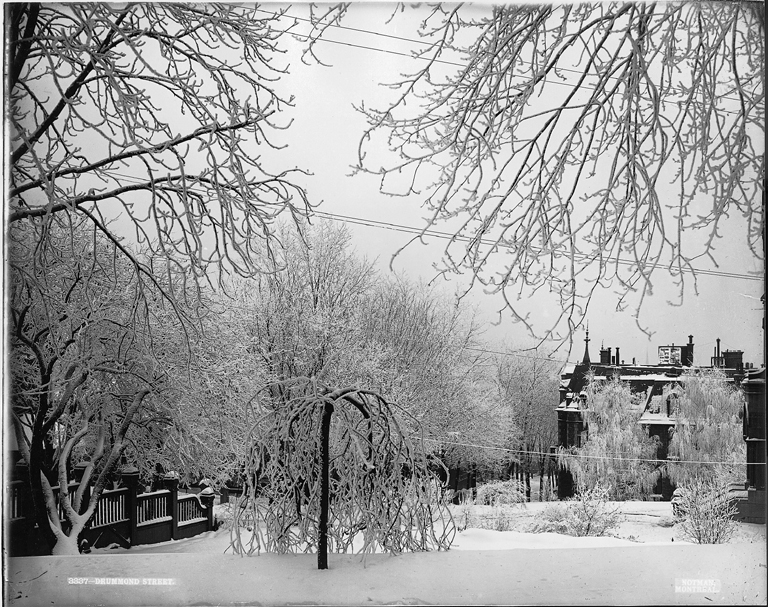
Drummond Street, 1895

The Scots-Quebecer businessman John Redpath (1796-1869), was a member of Montreal City Council from 1840 to 1843. He ceded the land that became Drummond Street on May 13, 1842 and named it after his second wife, Jane Drummond (1816-1907). The street was not named for General Gordon Drummond (no relation), as is sometimes thought.

Upper Drummond Street was one of the principal streets of the Golden Square Mile. Around 1925, it was a quiet tree-lined avenue of mansions belonging to the Drummond, Smithers, Molson, Reford, MacIntyre, Meighen (inherited from Lord Mount Stephen), Wallis, Angus, Reid, Davis, Brainard, Wanklyn, and Hosmer families.

Following a demolition spree that culminated in 1975, Drummond Street had become another typical modern street in Montreal, as it today. The George Stephen House, the final location of the Mount Stephen Club and former home of George Stephen, 1st Baron Mount Stephen remains, as does the home of Charles Hosmer, but the others have long since disappeared.

== Hockey ==
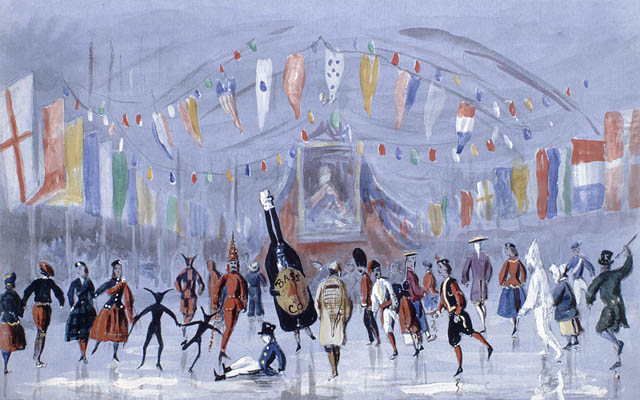
A fancy ball at the Victoria Skating Rink, on Drummond Street en 1865.

In 1862, the Victoria Skating Rink opened its doors on Drummond Street. The rink is best known for being the site of the first recorded organized indoor ice hockey game on March 3, 1875. It was also home to the first Stanley Cup playoff game. It was also the venue for numerous other activities such as the Montreal Winter Carnaval, fancy balls, exhibitions, and concerts.

Today, one block south, at the corner of Drummond and De la Gauchetière Street, is the Bell Centre, the home of the National Hockey League's Montreal Canadiens.
