= Redpath (surname) =

Redpath is a surname of Scottish origin. Notable people with the surname include:

- Alan Redpath (1907–1989), British evangelist, pastor and author
- Anne Redpath (1895–1965), British artist
- Beatrice Redpath (1886–1937), Canadian poet, short story writer
- Bryan Redpath (born 1971), rugby player
- Christine Redpath, ballet mistress and former soloist with New York City Ballet
- Ian Redpath (1941–2024), Australian cricketer
- James Redpath (1833–1891), American journalist and antislavery activist
- Jean Redpath (1937–2014), singer
- Jim Redpath, mining engineer
- John Redpath (1796–1869), Canadian businessman
- Olive Redpath, American Victorian actress
- Peter Redpath (1821–1894), Canadian businessman
- Ronald Francis Redpath (1888–1970), Canadian wing commander
