= James Wilson Robertson (educator) =

Canadian educator and cheesemaker (1857–1930)

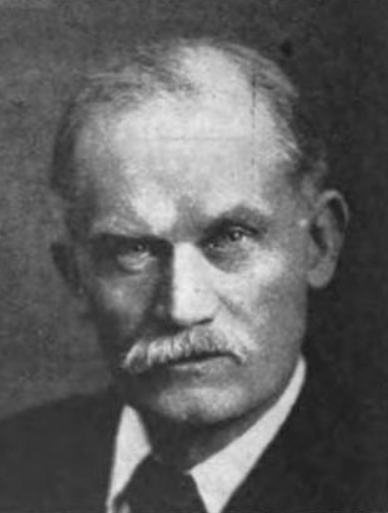
- Born: 2 November 1857; Dunlop, Scotland
- Died: 19 March 1930 (aged 72); Ottawa, Ontario
- Occupations: Educator, cheese producer
- Employer: Ontario Agricultural College
- Spouse: Jemima Jane Mather (m. 1896)

James Wilson Robertson (2 November 1857 – 19 March 1930) was a Canadian educator and cheese producer. He emigrated from Scotland to Canada at the age of 18, and was later appointed Canada's first Commissioner of Agriculture and Dairying. He was also a professor at the Ontario Agricultural College in the field of dairy.

== Early life and education ==
Robertson was born on 2 November 1857 in Dunlop, East Ayrshire, Scotland. He was the fourth of ten children of John and Mary Robertson (née Wilson). Robertson received no additional schooling after he was fourteen. After leaving school, Robertson became a leatherworking apprentice in Glasgow.

== Early career ==
Robertson moved to Canada in 1875, and eventually became a supervisor of cheese factories in Ontario. Robertson was successful in running the factories and ran eight of them by 1884. In 1886, he was hired to the position of professor of dairying at the Ontario Agricultural College. Robertson visited dairy-producing regions in the United States and Denmark, and brought practices he learned there back to Canada. From these trips, he encouraged storing corn in silos, which helped Canadian dairy farmers to make more money throughout the year.

Soon, he began to advocate for more than just education, advocating a plan of government subsidizing of cheese factories, to operate it "for a few years by a Government agent, but to withdraw as soon as the farmers had been initiated in the management". In association with the Dairymen's Association of the North-west, these plans of cooperative worker self-management proved fruitful in Prince Edward Island and Alberta. This cooperative still exists today, with nearly five hundred farms, since then renamed as Darigold.

While working at the college, Robertson appeared in travelling lecture series, and was sought after by colleges in the United States to join their faculty as well as by politicians who wished to hire him. In 1890, Robertson was appointed Canadian commissioner of agriculture.

In his capacity as commissioner, Robertson continued to promote silos, and created demonstration stations throughout Canada. He also made an effort for Canadian dairy to increase its share of the British dairy market. Robertson continued to gain prominence and received additional job offers, which he would use to increase his own position in the department of agriculture, causing him to have the highest salary of any worker by the time he left in 1904.

== Work with William Macdonald ==
In 1897, while he was still agriculture commissioner, Robertson met William Christopher Macdonald. Macdonald was a tobacco businessman and philanthropist who was interested in education reform, a topic that also interested Robertson. Together, they created the Macdonald Manual Training Fund. Founded in 1897, it gave prizes of $100 to children who grew excellent seeds and grains. By 1900, the fund was awarding $10,000 in prizes. Based on these competitions, the Canadian Seed Growers' Association was formed in 1904. The two men also worked to form the Macdonald Rural Schools Fund, the Macdonald Consolidated Schools Project, and the Macdonald Institute of Home Economics with Adelaide Sophia Hunter. This work eventually led Robertson to being named the first principal of Macdonald College, which later became the Macdonald Campus at McGill University.

== Later career ==
Robertson served as the first principal of Macdonald College, and oversaw construction and hired its first staff. Robertson eventually came into conflict with Macdonald and following budgetary restrictions in 1909, when the board of governors restricted his spending to $100, he resigned as principal in 1910.

Following his resignation he served in various governmental and philanthropic positions. He served on the Canadian federal Commission of Conservation, chairing the land committee, and was appointed to the royal commission on industrial training and technical education in 1910, which he chaired until 1913.

He was active in charitable efforts surrounding World War I, serving as the chair of the Canadian Red Cross's national executive and created the Canadian committee of the Agricultural Relief of the Allies Fund. He was an advisor to the Supreme Economic Council on food security during the post-war peace discussions.

== Personal life and death ==
Robertson did not have a prominent presence in Ottawa's social circles. He was a member of St. Andrew's Presbyterian Church with his wife, Jennie. He also served as the governor of the Victorian Order of Nurses from 1902 to 1927. He died at his home in Ottawa on 19 March 1930 from a ruptured stomach ulcer.

== Works ==
- "Canadian Agriculture and Rural Education" . The Empire and the century. London: John Murray. 1905. pp. 385–402.
