= Macdonald Campus of McGill University =

McGill University campus in Sainte-Anne-de-Bellevue, Quebec

Coordinates: 45°24′27″N 73°56′18″W

- Coat of arms
- Other name: Campus Macdonald (French)
- Former name: Macdonald College
- Motto: Mastery for Service
- Type: Academic department of public university
- Established: 1907; 119 years ago
- Parent institution: McGill University
- Dean: Valérie Orsat
- Undergraduates: 1220
- Postgraduates: 639
- Location: Sainte-Anne-de-Bellevue, Quebec, Canada
- Campus: Macdonald Campus: 6.5 km^{2} (2.51 sq mi) or 650 ha (1,600 acres) of fields and forested land in Sainte-Anne-de-Bellevue, 30 km (19 mi) west of the downtown campus
- Colours: Gold and green
- Website: www.mcgill.ca/macdonald

The Macdonald Campus (commonly referred to as the Mac Campus or simply Mac) is a campus of McGill University, located in the city of Sainte-Anne-de-Bellevue, Quebec, Canada. The campus mainly hosts agricultural, environmental, and food sciences programs.

The campus hosts the university's Faculty of Agricultural and Environmental Sciences, the School of Human Nutrition, and the Institute of Parasitology. The property is also the home of the public college John Abbott College.

== History ==
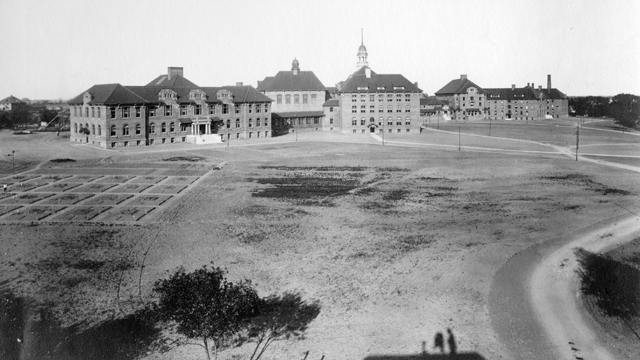
Macdonald College under construction, 1906

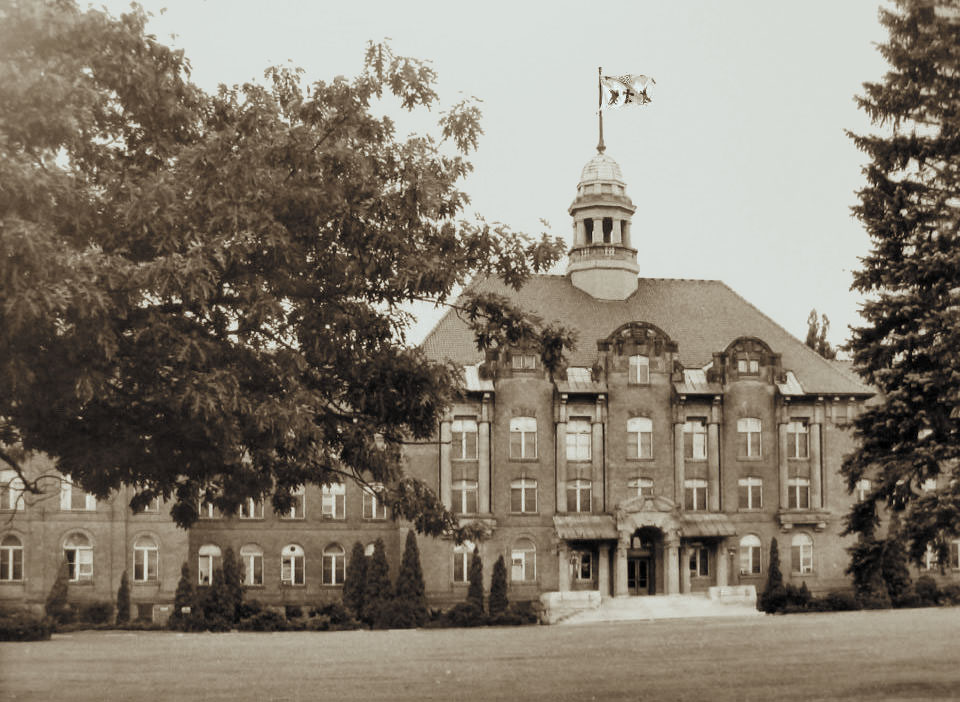
The main building in the 1940s

Construction began in 1905, and the school opened its doors to students in 1907 as the Macdonald College of McGill University. Planned and funded completely by Sir William Macdonald, who also provided a $2 million operating endowment, it was designed by architects Alexander Cowper Hutchison and George W. Wood.

James Wilson Robertson served as its first principal, and oversaw its construction and hired its first staff. Robertson eventually came into conflict with Macdonald and following budgetary restrictions in 1909, resigned from this position in 1910.

Several buildings on the downtown McGill campus were also funded by Sir William Macdonald and designed by the Montreal-based architect Andrew Taylor, including the Macdonald Physics Building (1893), Redpath Library (1893), Macdonald Engineering Building (1907), and the Strathcona Medical Building (1907)—since renamed the Strathcona Anatomy and Dentistry Building.

Far surpassing the Ontario Agricultural College, Macdonald College was the largest in Canada and in its day was one of the most modern agricultural colleges in the world. After two years of planning and construction, the college opened in the fall of 1907 under principal James Wilson Robertson.

The McGill School for Teachers was also moved to MacDonald Campus in 1907. In 1965 it was renamed the Faculty of Education, and in 1970 it was relocated to McGill's Downtown Campus.

In 1938, the Rural Adult Education Service of Macdonald College was established. In 1943, John W. McConnell purchased an adjacent 1,380 acres (560 ha) of farmland and donated it to the college, increasing the property's size to its current 1,600 acres (650 ha).

In 1965, it became the Macdonald Campus of McGill University. Students studying at Macdonald Campus can earn internationally recognized degrees at both the undergraduate - B.Sc.(Agr) - and graduate level in the fields of agriculture, food, natural sciences, applied economics, environment, and engineering.

In 1971, McGill leased a portion of the Macdonald Campus to the newly created John Abbott College, vacating many historic buildings for the CEGEP. This coincided with McGill's decision to move the Faculty of Education to the downtown campus. In 2002, this portion of the campus was permanently sold to John Abbott College.

On September 26, 2006, Canada Post issued a special commemorative stamp in honour of the 100th anniversary of the founding of the college.

== Programs ==
The Faculty of Agricultural and Environmental Sciences (FAES) and the School of Human Nutrition are located on McGill University's Macdonald Campus. The campus comprises 650 hectares in a waterfront setting on the western tip of the island of Montreal.

The faculty offers:

- Certificate in Ecological Agriculture
- Bachelor of Science in Agriculture; Bachelor of Agricultural and Environmental Sciences in Agricultural Science with option in International Agriculture; Bachelor of Science Agriculture Science in Agricultural Science with option in Ecological Agriculture

The faculty offers a variety of degree programs at the undergraduate level leading to a B.Sc. degree in either Agricultural and Environmental Sciences (AgEnvSc), Food Science (FoodSc) or Nutritional Sciences (NutrSci), or a B.Eng degree in Bioresource Engineering (BREE). In addition, M.Sc., M.Sc. Applied and Ph.D. programs are offered in the areas of Agricultural Sciences, Biological Sciences, Bioresource Engineering, Biotechnology, Environmental Sciences, Food Science, and Nutritional Sciences. The Faculty offers some Graduate Certificates and Diplomas. The Faculty also offers some post-baccalaureate certificates: Certificate in Ecological Agriculture, Certificate in Food Science and Diploma in the Environment.

== Library services ==
Located in the Barton Building, the Macdonald Campus Library is a specialized branch of the McGill Library system.

Its services and programs support the students and faculty of the Faculty of Agricultural and Environmental Sciences, the School of Dietetics and Human Nutrition, the Institute of Parasitology, the Morgan Arboretum, and the Macdonald Farm.

The Macdonald Campus Library also offers a seed library service, which allows McGill students and faculty to borrow, grow, and return heirloom and local seeds.

== Coat of arms ==
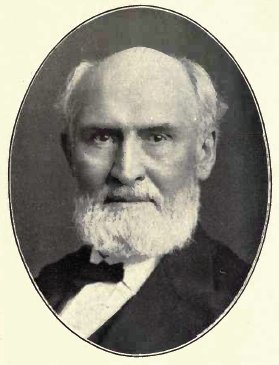
Canadian philanthropist Sir William Macdonald

The Macdonald Campus coat of arms honours Sir William Macdonald, the major benefactor of McGill's agricultural college:

The colour of the field (gold) and the arm holding a cross (red) are from the second quarter of the arms of Sir William Macdonald, the tobacco manufacturer and philanthropist, who founded the College. His armorial bearings derived from the fact that he was a grandson of John, eighth Macdonald of Glenaladale. Until the 1930s, Macdonald College used Sir William's achievement as one quarter of the College arms. The two red martlets and the open book with its motto are from the arms of McGill University. The clover leaves (also gold) signify fertility and their three segments suggest the three purposes of the Campus, i.e. agriculture, service and food.

== See also ==
- Canadian Aviation Heritage Centre
- J. S. Marshall Radar Observatory
- List of agricultural universities and colleges
- Morgan Arboretum
