= Scots-Quebecers =

Quebecers of Scottish descent

Scottish Quebecer Québécois écossais (French) Ceàrd na h-Alba (Scottish Gaelic)
- (Scotland) (Quebec)

Total population
- Scots-Quebecers: 202,515 Total Responses 2.7% of Quebec's Population; 30,255 Single Responses 0.4% of Quebec's Population

Regions with significant populations
- Montreal, Quebec City, Eastern Townships

Languages
- Quebec English, Quebec French, Scottish Gaelic, Lowland Scots

Religion
- Protestant (Anglican, Baptist, Presbyterian, United Church of Canada), Roman Catholic

Related ethnic groups
- Scottish, Scottish Canadians, Ulster Scots, English-speaking Quebecer

Scots-Quebecers (French: Québécois écossais) are Quebecers who are of Scottish descent.

== Background ==
Few Scots came to Quebec (then New France) before the Seven Years' War. Those who did blended in with the French population. Perhaps the first Scot to settle was Abraham Martin dit l'Écossais (1589-1664), who by the year 1800 had 7,765 married descendants among the French-speaking population.

In 1763, the French population of Quebec was approximately 55,000 when France handed it over to Great Britain under the terms of the Treaty of Paris (1763) that ended the French and Indian War.

By the beginning of the 19th century, the Quebec population was expanding slowly as immigration began from Great Britain. Impoverished Scottish immigrants, many the victim of the Highland and Lowland Clearances, saw unlimited opportunity in this huge forested land. The bond between Scotland and France, however, also extended to numerous other areas such as the Gens d’Armes Ecossais (Scots Men-At-Arms) who guarded the kings of France for nearly three hundred years. Today, in France, there are many descendants of these Scots. They carry names such as Campbell and MacDonald, a famous example being Jacques MacDonald, a Marshal of France.

== Settling ==
Some of these Scottish immigrants settled in Quebec City but many with an entrepreneurial drive kept moving west to Montreal which at the time was little more than a small port town on the St. Lawrence River. By far the majority of the Scots arrived in Quebec with little more than the shirt on their back. John Redpath, who had only enough money for ships passage to Quebec City, walked all the way to Montreal.

== Commerce, science and culture ==
In 1779, Scotsman Simon McTavish helped establish what would become the North West Company to compete in the fur trade with the English owned giant, the Hudson's Bay Company. Since 1670, the Hudson's Bay Company had been operating an unchallenged monopoly in the territory in the northwest known as Rupert's Land, which comprised nearly half of what is now Canada. In the process, McTavish became the most important businessman in all of Canada.

By the first decade of the 1800s, Montreal had grown to around 9,000 inhabitants and the Scottish immigrants who chose to make Montreal their home soon began to play a key role in the city's cultural, scientific, and business life. Although at their peak, the Scots made up only a small percentage of Quebec's population, they affected the city of Montreal and the Province of Quebec far beyond their numbers. Starting from an almost non-existent economic base, they were instrumental in improving the Province's commercial prospects by exploiting an untapped hinterland. They transformed the small fortified town into the business hub for much of the St Lawrence basin and worked to enhance the Province's economic power. Scots led a wave of immigrants seeking a better life that saw Montreal's population grow from 9,000 in 1800 to 50,000 by the year 1850.

Other Scots were instrumental in building the Lachine Canal that turned Montreal into one of the most important and prosperous ports in North America. The canal led to a rapid industrialization that began in the late 1840s with Montreal manufacturers producing products for the entire nation. It was also Scots who constructed Montreal's first bridge across the Saint Lawrence River and Henry Morgan built the first department store in Canada that was the envy of the country. Scot settlers founded many of the city's great industries including the Bank of Montreal, Redpath Sugar, and from headquarters they established in Montreal, Scots were the driving force that built both of Canada's national railroads. Early on, they realized the importance for the mercantile community to create the institutions and instruments that enabled business to be the catalyst for improved standards of living for all its citizens. Because of their work and vision, by 1860 they were greatly responsible for making Montreal the most important city in British North America.

Noted for their willingness to help fellow Scots succeed in the new world, they are also remembered for giving back to the country that had provided them with the opportunity to prosper. Scots established and funded numerous Montreal institutions such as McGill University, the Literary and Historical Society of Quebec and the Royal Victoria Hospital.

== Notable Scots-Quebecers ==
A few of these Scots and their offspring who were major factors in building Montreal and the Province of Quebec into the economic hub of Canada are:

- Hugh Allan (1810–1882), financier and shipping magnate
- Montagu H. Allan (1860–1951), banker, ship owner, sportsman
- Richard Bladworth Angus (1831–1922), banker
- Robert Mitchell Ballantyne (1859–1929), businessman
- Aeneas Cameron (1757–1822), fur trader
- Thomas Neill Cream (1850–1892), serial killer
- John William Dawson (1820–1899), scientist, educator
- Richard Dobie (1731–1805), fur trader, businessman
- William Dow (1800–1868), brewer and businessman
- George Alexander Drummond (1829–1910), entrepreneur
- James Dunlop (1757–1815), businessman
- Robert Ellice (1747–1790), merchant and fur trader
- Malcolm Fraser (1733-1815), army and militia officer, seigneur, and office holder
- Duncan Fisher (1753–1820), businessman
- Hugh Graham (1848–1938), newspaper publisher
- Peter Grant (1764–1848), fur trader
- William Grant (1744–1805), merchant, politician
- Alexander Henderson (1831–1913), merchant and photographer
- James D. Johnson (1949) businessman
- William C. Macdonald (1831–1917), tobacco manufacturer, philanthropist
- Dugald Lorn MacDougall (1811–1885), stockbroker, investor
- Joseph Mackay (1810–1881), businessman
- Hugh Mackay (1832–1890), businessman
- Robert Mackay (1840–1916), businessman, statesman
- Roderick Mackenzie (1761–1844), fur trader, politician
- James McGill (1744–1813), fur trader, merchant, politician
- Peter McGill (1789–1860), businessman, politician
- William McGillivray (1764–1825), fur trader
- Duncan McIntyre (1834–1894), businessman
- Archibald McKillop (1824–1905), poet, known as The Blind Bard of Megantic
- Simon McTavish (1750–1804), fur trader, saw mill and flour mill operator
- Henry Morgan (1819–1893), built the first department store in Canada
- Donald Morrison (1858-1894), outlaw who became a folk hero
- John Nairne soldier and seigneur
- John Neilson (1776–1848), printer, publisher, politician
- Alexander Walker Ogilvie (1829–1902), miller, statesman
- William Watson Ogilvie (1835–1900), businessman
- Andrew Paton (1833–1892), textile manufacturer, politician
- John Redpath (1796–1869), contractor, industrialist
- Peter Redpath (1821–1894), businessman
- Andrew Robertson (1827–1890), businessman
- James Gibb Ross (1819–1888), merchant, statesman
- James Ross (1848–1913), railway engineer, businessman
- William Henry Scott (1799–1851), politician, businessman
- John Hamilton Simons (1823–1906), businessman and founder of La Maison Simons
- Philip Simpson Ross (1827–1907), founder of the Order of Chartered Accountants of Quebec
- George Simpson (1787–1860), executive, fur trader
- Donald Alexander Smith (1820–1914), fur trader, financier, railroad baron and politician.
- George Stephen (1829–1921), banker and railway executive
- Daniel Sutherland (1756–1832), businessman
- David Torrance (1805–1876), merchant, banker
- John Torrance (1786–1870), merchant, shipper
- William Watson (c.1795–1867), miller, businessman, politician
- John Young (1811–1878), entrepreneur, statesman
- John Young (c.1759–1819), seigneur, businessman, judge and politician

== See also ==
- Anglo-Quebecer
- Celtic music in Canada
- Elmwood Cemetery (Sherbrooke)
- Irish Quebecers
- List of Irish Quebecers
- Québécois
- Scottish American
- Scottish-Canadian
