= Richard B. Angus =

Scottish-Canadian banker, financier and philanthropist

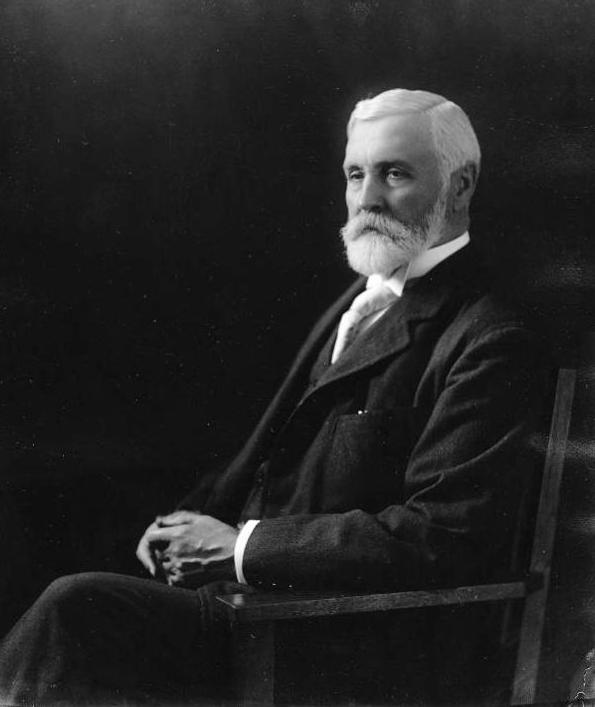
- Angus in 1906

13th President of the Bank of Montreal
- In office 1910–1913
- Preceded by: Sir George Drummond
- Succeeded by: Sir Vincent Meredith

Personal details
- Born: 28 May 1831 Bathgate, West Lothian, Scotland
- Died: 17 September 1922 (aged 91) Senneville, Quebec, Canada
- Spouse: Mary Anne Daniels
- Children: Elspeth Hudson Angus; Bertha Angus; Edith Margaret Angus; Margaret Forrest Angus (Donald) Forbes Angus; Maud Angus; William Forrest Angus (David) James Angus
- Occupation: Banker and financier
- Known for: Co-founder of the CPR

Richard Bladworth Angus (28 May 1831 – 17 September 1922) was a Scottish-Canadian banker, financier, and philanthropist. He was a co-founder and vice-president of the Canadian Pacific Railway, president of the Bank of Montreal, president of the Royal Victoria Hospital, Montreal, president of the Montreal Art Association, and co-founder and president of the Mount Royal Club. He was the natural successor to Lord Mount Stephen as president of the Canadian Pacific Railway in 1888, but he did not desire the position; he twice refused a knighthood. The CPR Angus Shops were named for him, as was one of the later CP Ships.

== Early life ==
In 1831, Angus was born in Scotland at Bathgate. He was a younger son of Alexander Angus (b. 1792), a merchant grocer from Rafford, Morayshire, and his wife Margaret Forrest (b. 1802), of Bathgate. Alexander Angus was a friend of the father of Sir James Young Simpson, and five of his eight children came to Canada at various stages. Educated at Bathgate Academy, Angus' first employment was in Manchester as a clerk with the Manchester and Liverpool Bank. In 1857, at Manchester, he married his wife, Mary Anne Daniels (1833–1913), the daughter of a Manchester wine merchant. In the same year as his marriage, he came with his wife to Montreal and found employment as a book-keeper with the Bank of Montreal, from where he advanced rapidly.

By 1861, Angus was placed in charge of the bank's Chicago office, and two years later, he was promoted to second agent in New York. The following year, he returned to Canada as interim manager of the bank's headquarters in Montreal. By 1869, he succeeded Edwin Henry King as the bank's general manager with an annual salary of $8,000, a position he held for the next ten years. During this time, he improved relations with the federal government (at a time when the Bank of Montreal acted as Canada's national bank) and turned over respectable profits despite the economic slump of the 1870s.

== Building the Canadian Pacific Railway ==
During his time with the Bank of Montreal, Angus was free to pursue opportunities for private investment. In 1868, he went into partnership with the future Lords Mount Stephen and Strathcona at the time that they were becoming interested in developing railways across to the Canadian West. Their ventures were largely financed by the Bank of Montreal, of which Mount Stephen was president, and as his number two at the bank, Angus was closely involved. Angus resigned from the bank in 1879, briefly relocating to St. Paul, Minnesota, to represent the group's interests there as vice-president of the Saint Paul and Pacific Railroad.

In Minnesota, Angus had worked closely with James J. Hill, constructing and improving the line. But by 1880, he spent most of his time with Mount Stephen as they made numerous trips to Ottawa, New York, and London to negotiate the land grants, subsidies, and building of the Canadian Pacific Railway. With Angus providing the analysis and Mount Stephen the acumen, they proved to be a formidable pair. Angus was general manager of the CPR until the appointment of Sir William Cornelius Van Horne in 1882, when Angus became vice-president. In that position, Angus was entrusted with the creation of the eastern network, notably the extension of the Ontario and Quebec Railway and the purchase of the western section of the 'Quebec, Montreal, Ottawa and Occidental Railway' in 1882.

The construction of the CPR was fraught with financial peril, testing the resilience of the syndicate – Hill resigned in 1883, followed by Angus' close friend Duncan McIntyre the next year. To lobby for funds more successfully, Angus resigned from the St. Paul Railway in 1884. The CPR, completed in 1885, was an immediate financial success, becoming "the world's greatest transportation system". He remained vice-president of the CPR after Lord Mount Stephen resigned from an active role as president in 1888. Apparently never aspiring to the position, Angus supported Stephen's selection of Van Horne as president and, 11 years later, Van Horne's choice of Lord Shaughnessy as his successor. Angus would serve as a director and committee member of the CPR for over 40 years, necessitating frequent trips to the Canadian Pacific Offices on Trafalgar Square in London.

== Banking and industry ==
Angus's wealth now allowed him to further invest in the vast number of companies associated with the CPR and its directors. Among others, he sat on the boards of Canada North-West Land Company; Royal Trust Company; Dominion Bridge Company; Dominion Iron and Steel Company; Grand Falls Power Company; Pacific Coal Company; Canadian Salt Company; and the London & Lancashire Assurance Company in England.

He joined Sir William Van Horne and former CPR contractors James Ross and Sir William Mackenzie as an investor in street railways in Montreal, Toronto and Winnipeg. Prior to his death, he would be the principal shareholder in Mackenzie's Toronto Power Company. He invested with Van Horne in the Laurentide Paper Company, was among the founding financiers of the British Columbia Sugar Refinery, and was a principal backer of the Federal Telephone Company. The British Columbia Sugar Refinery was started by Benjamin Tingley Rogers, the 'brash' husband of his niece, Mary Isabella Angus.

Angus also played a role in maintaining the close relationship between the CPR and the Bank of Montreal, whose growth in the Canadian West ran side by side that of the railway. In 1891, he returned to the bank as a director, and after the death of Sir George Alexander Drummond, he was elected as the bank's president from 1910 to 1913, when he was succeeded by his son-in-law's brother, Sir Vincent Meredith. By 1912, Angus was one of the bank's largest shareholders, and after retiring as president, he remained a director until his death.

== Private life and philanthropy ==
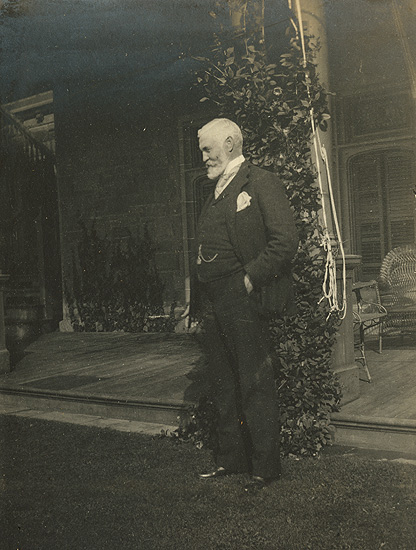
Angus at his country house, c. 1900

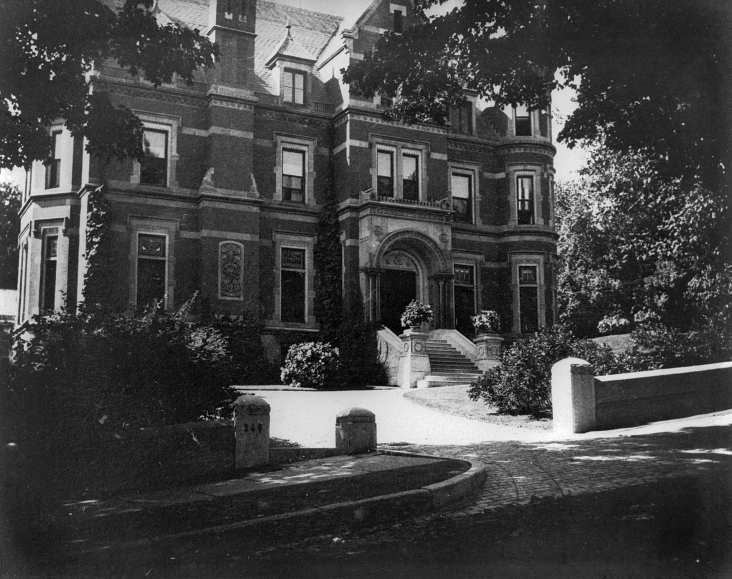
The Angus family's home at 240 Drummond Street in Montreal

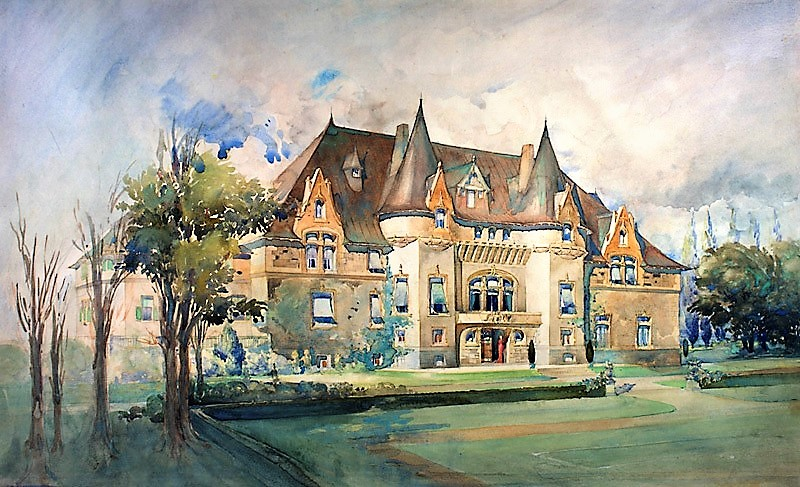
Pine Bluff, the Angus family's country house in Senneville (demolished in the 1950s)

In 1878, Angus and his family moved into his new house at 240 Drummond Street in the Golden Square Mile. Like many wealthy Montrealers, Angus had a passion for floriculture, particularly his beloved orchids, and the house featured a large conservatory. His new home provided a suitable space for the art collection that he had started with purchases from Montreal and London dealers in the late 1870s. His collection contained many fine examples of the Old Masters. Angus served as president of the Art Association of Montreal, donating six paintings in 1889 – the most significant gift since the Association's foundation and the first major one in contemporary art. Before his Montreal home was demolished in 1957, it served as McGill University's conservatory of music.

In 1901, Angus commissioned the construction of a grand country house on an estate named Pine Bluff at 218 Senneville Road in Senneville, Quebec, overlooking the Lake of Two Mountains. It was designed in the Châteauesque style by Edward Maxwell and his younger brother, William Maxwell. The house was completed in 1904 and replaced a home that had been built on the site in 1886 for Angus and then remodeled by Edward Maxwell from 1898 to 1899 before being destroyed by fire soon after. The new home, which included an ice house and a peach house, was later remodelled and eventually demolished in the 1950s.

Despite the dawn of the automobile, when Angus was president of the Bank of Montreal in 1910, he was still seen every morning arriving at the bank's headquarters in his four-in-hand carriage. A "quiet, purposeful man", Angus enjoyed vigorous health and remained active until the end of his life, even embarking on a European tour in 1921, at the age of ninety.

Angus had become one of the wealthiest men in Montreal, and he was also well known for his philanthropic activities and generous donations to the causes to which he allied himself. He was President of the Royal Victoria Hospital, Montreal, and in 1906 co-founded the Alexandra Contagious Diseases Hospital, serving as a governor. He was president and Governor of the Fraser Institute Free Public Library; vice-president of the Victorian Order of Nurses, Governor of McGill University (to which he donated one of his more considerable sums) and Governor of the Montreal General Hospital. He was a director of the Charity Organization Society, which he generously funded.

As one of Montreal's most prominent Scots-Quebecers, he was elected President of the St Andrew's Society. In 1889, he co-founded the Mount Royal Club, where he was later President. He was a member of more than a dozen clubs throughout Canada, including: the St. James Club, of which he was formerly chairman; the Montreal Jockey Club; the Auto Club and Aero Club; the Forest and Stream Club; the Winter Club; the Rideau Club of Ottawa; The Toronto Club; the York Club; and the Manitoba Club. He was an honorary member of the Antiquarian and Numismatic Society of Montreal.

== Legacy and family ==
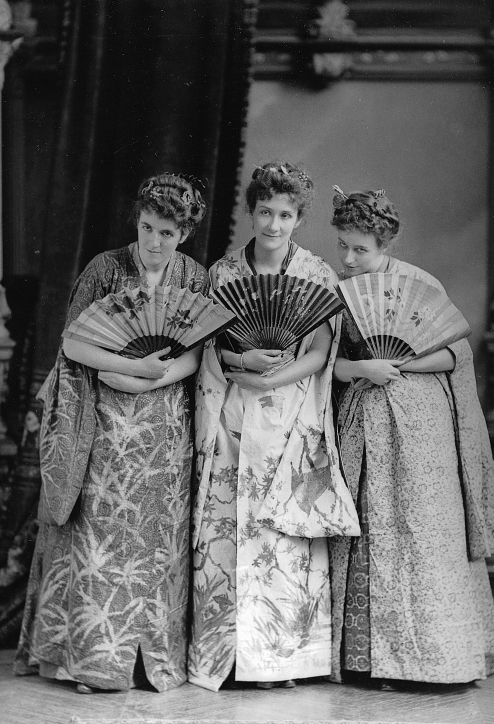
The three eldest Angus girls before the Castanet Club Ball, 1886

Angus had occupied one of the most prominent positions in Canadian banking by the age of thirty eight. Abandoning that position for a highly speculative railway venture, he not only revealed his personality but also the allure of the railways and the riches they offered. As President of the Bank of Montreal and with the fortune he made from the CPR, he had already secured for himself a place of the highest standing in Canada, but he more than doubled that fortune through his associations with, and investments in, coal, pulp and paper, iron and steel, land and insurance. Angus paid for the education of several of his nephews, including Captain Harry Angus (1891–1989), who graduated from Balliol College, Oxford, before returning to Victoria, British Columbia.

Angus' estate was divided between his eight surviving children:

- Elspeth Hudson Angus (1858–1936), married Charles Meredith. They died without children.
- Bertha Angus, married Robert MacDougall Paterson (1859–1922), stockbroker of Montreal. He was the eldest son of Alexander Thomas Paterson (1833–1909), President of the Montreal Telegraph Company and a director of the Bank of Montreal. They died without children.
- Edith Margaret Angus (d. 1907), married Frederic Lumb Wanklyn (1860–1930), CPR executive, vice-president of the Windsor Hotel, Montreal, President of the Montreal Terminal Railway.
- Margaret Forrest Angus, married Dr. Charles F. Martin (1868–1953), Dean of the McGill University Faculty of Medicine. He was later President of the Montreal Art Association and succeeded Martha Allan as President of the Montreal Repertory Theatre.
- (Donald) Forbes Angus (1866–1943), Chairman of Standard Life Assurance and President of Guardian Life Assurance. Among others, he was a director of the Bank of Montreal, the Royal Trust Company and the British Columbia Sugar Refinery. He married Mary Henshaw, daughter of Colonel F.C. Henshaw of Montreal and his wife, Maud MacDougall.
- Maud Angus (d. 1946), married Dr. Walter William Chipman (1867–1950), Chief of Gynaecology at the Royal Victoria Hospital; Professor of Obstetrics and Gynaecology at McGill University.
- William Forrest Angus (1873–1951), President of the Dominion Bridge Company and the Mental Hygiene Institute, Montreal.
- (David) James Angus, of Rockland Avenue, Victoria, British Columbia.

Although Lord Mount Stephen is generally credited as the genius that created the CPR empire, with his banking and administrative experience, Angus was an indispensable lieutenant. In 1904, the CPR named its new repair complexes in Montreal the CPR Angus Shops in his honour. He died at his country house, Pine Bluff, on 17 September 1922. Two days later, on the day of his funeral, the CPR stopped all trains for two minutes – a symbolic gesture to one of its founding partners. He was buried at the Mount Royal Cemetery in Montreal.

Business positions
Preceded by Sir George Alexander Drummond	President of the Bank of Montreal; 1910–1913	Succeeded by Sir Vincent Meredith
