= Macdonald Tobacco =

Former Canadian tobacco company

Macdonald Tobacco Company
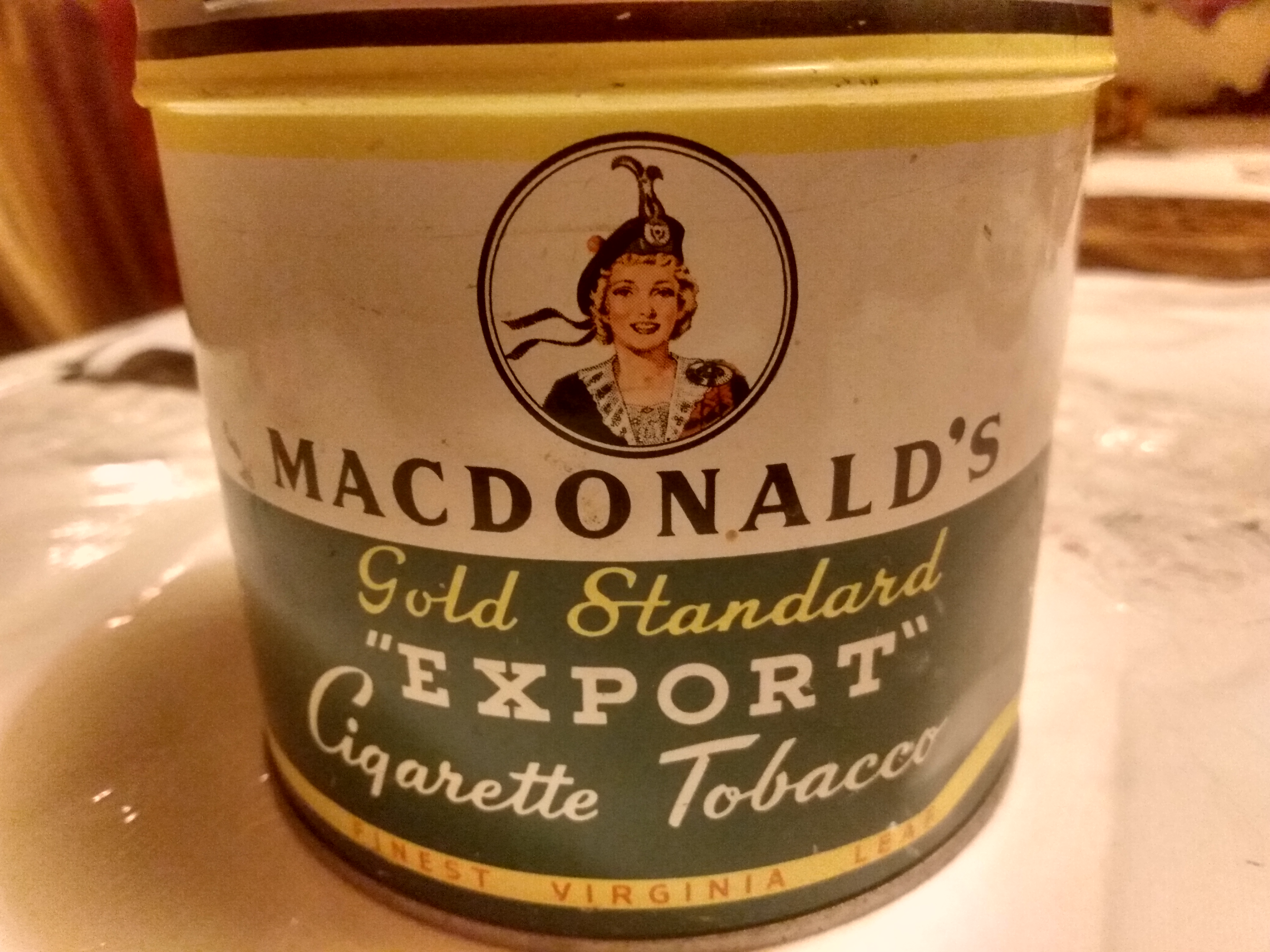
- Industry: Tobacco
- Founded: 1858; 167 years ago
- Founders: William C. Macdonald; Augustine Macdonald
- Fate: Sold in 1974 to R.J. Reynolds
- Headquarters: Montreal, Quebec, Canada

The Macdonald Tobacco Company (initially called McDonald Brothers and Co.) was a Canadian tobacco company that was founded in 1858 by William C. Macdonald and his brother Augustine. The company converted tobacco leaf from southern U.S. suppliers to pipe and chewing tobacco in Montreal, Quebec. After several acquisitions, it is now known as Japan Tobacco International (JTI), which manages flagship brands such as Benson & Hedges, Camel, Glamour, LD, Mevius, Natural American Spirit, Silk Cut, Sobranie, and Winston.

== History ==
The Macdonald Tobacco Company was established in 1858 by William C. Macdonald and his brother Augustine. While the use of tobacco products was growing in popularity, the American Civil War afforded the fledgling company an opportunity that brought enormous financial success, leading to Macdonald Tobacco emerging as the preeminent tobacco company in Canada. Since the northern U.S. faced a tobacco shortage due to the Civil War conflict (as tobacco growers were located in the south), Macdonald Tobacco bought tobacco leaf from the Southern United States and transported it via ocean cargo vessels to Montreal. Macdonald Tobacco processed the tobacco leaf into a finished product, then sold it to the tobacco-starved market in the northern U.S.

By the early 1870s, the company had over 500 employees. During this period, William Macdonald bought out his brother's stock position.

Deeply proud of his Scottish heritage, William Macdonald imprinted a Scottish Lass on the product packaging for nearly a century. Macdonald actually disliked tobacco, and upon his death in 1917, he bequeathed his company to Walter and Howard Stewart, the two sons of company manager David Stewart.

Walter Stewart, who took over as president, replaced pipe tobacco with "roll your own" cigarettes. In 1922, packaged cigarette production was added, quickly becoming the mainstay of the business. During the 1960s, David M. Stewart (1920–1984) expanded the business into the manufacturing of cigars.

The Macdonald Tobacco Company remained in the Stewart family until 1974, when David M. Stewart sold it to the American tobacco giant R.J. Reynolds, which – in light of the uncertainty created by the Quebec sovereignty movement – relocated the head office to Toronto, Ontario. Most of those assets were later purchased by Japan Tobacco.
