= Redpath Sugar Refinery =

Sugar storage, refining and museum complex in Toronto, Ontario, Canada

Coordinates: 43.642574°N 79.370459°W

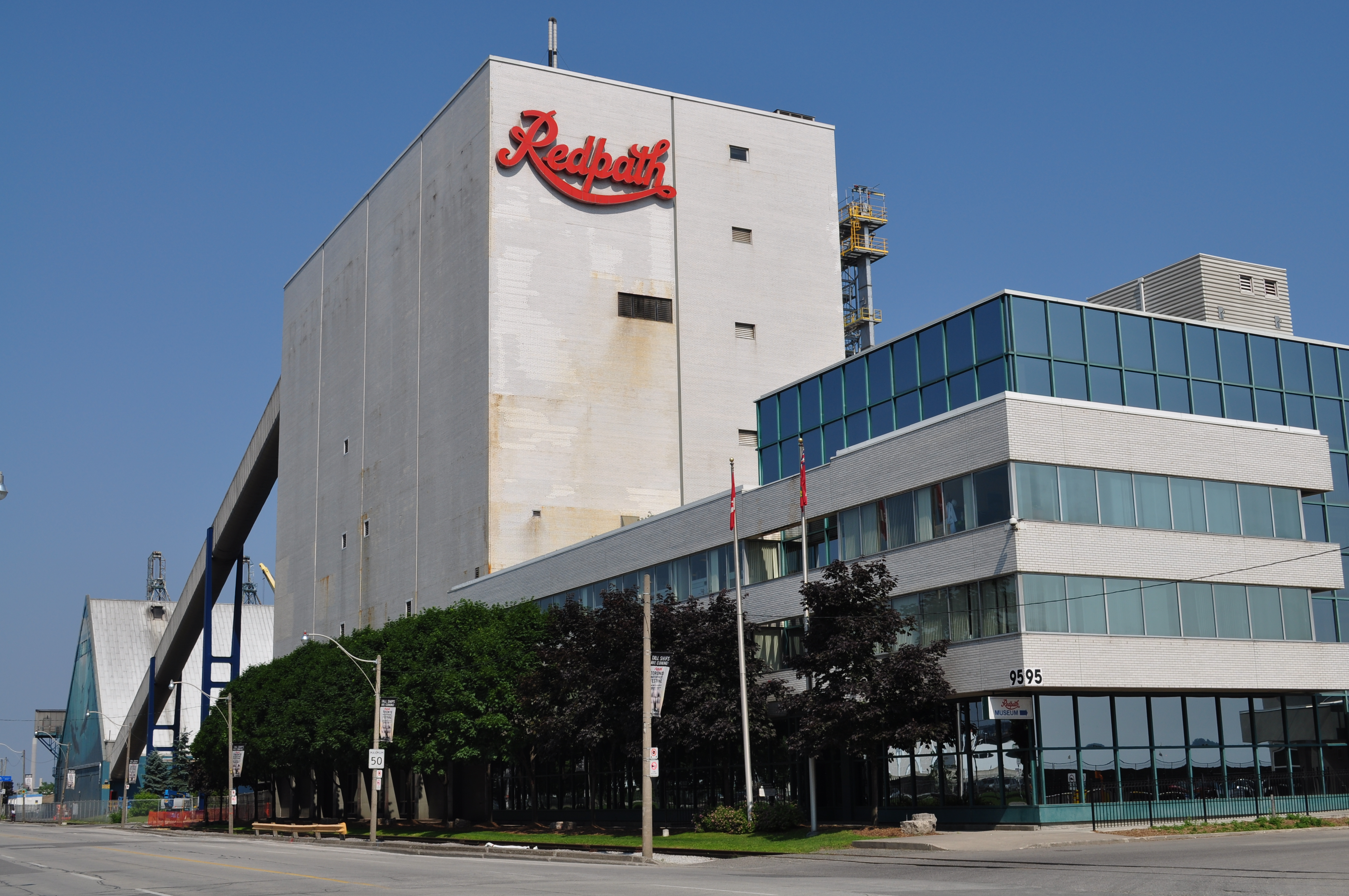
- Interactive map of the Redpath Sugar Refinery area

General information
- Type: Sugar refinery
- Location: Toronto, Ontario, Canada, Queens Quay at Jarvis Street
- Completed: 1958

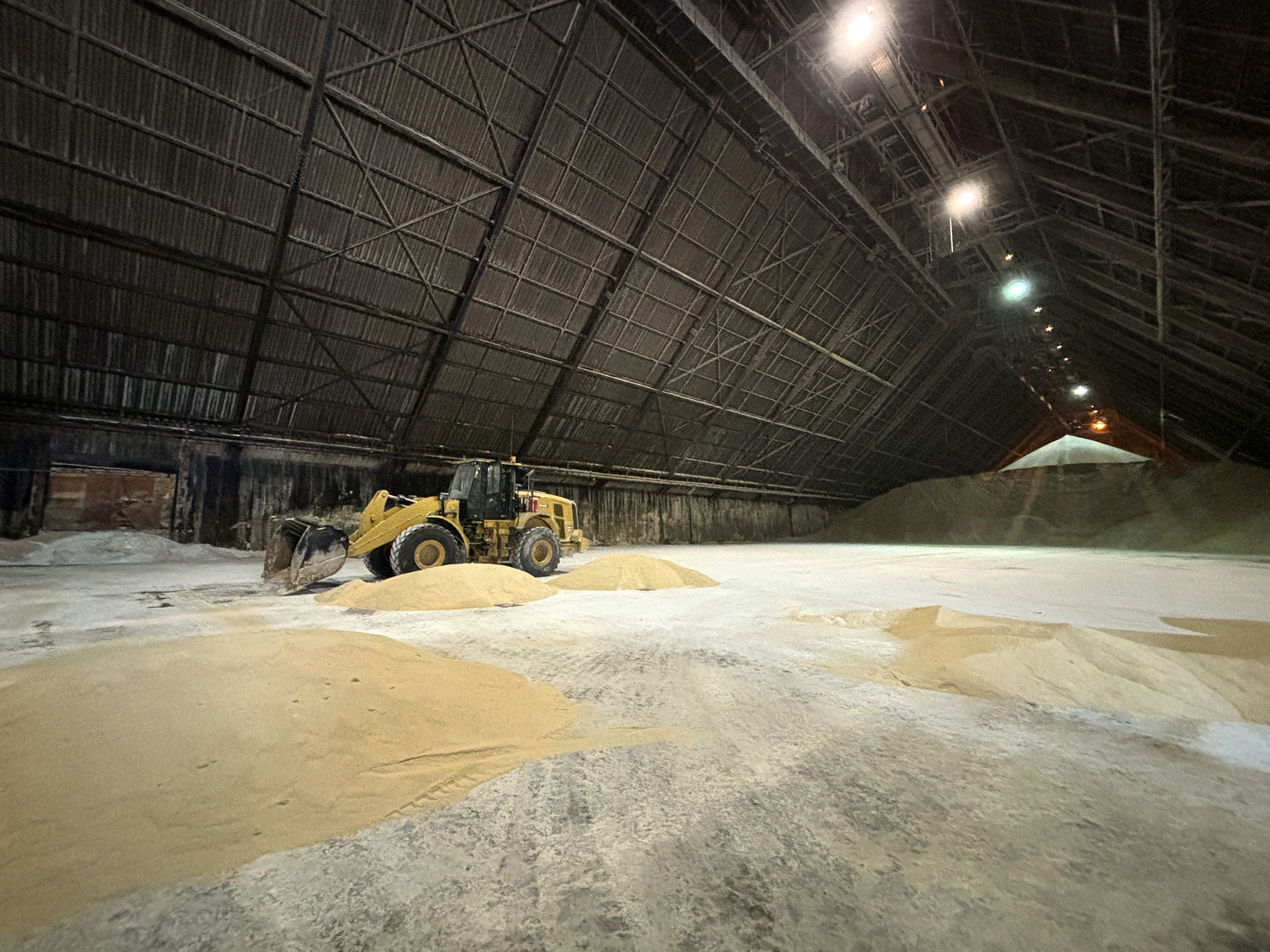
Inside of the storage

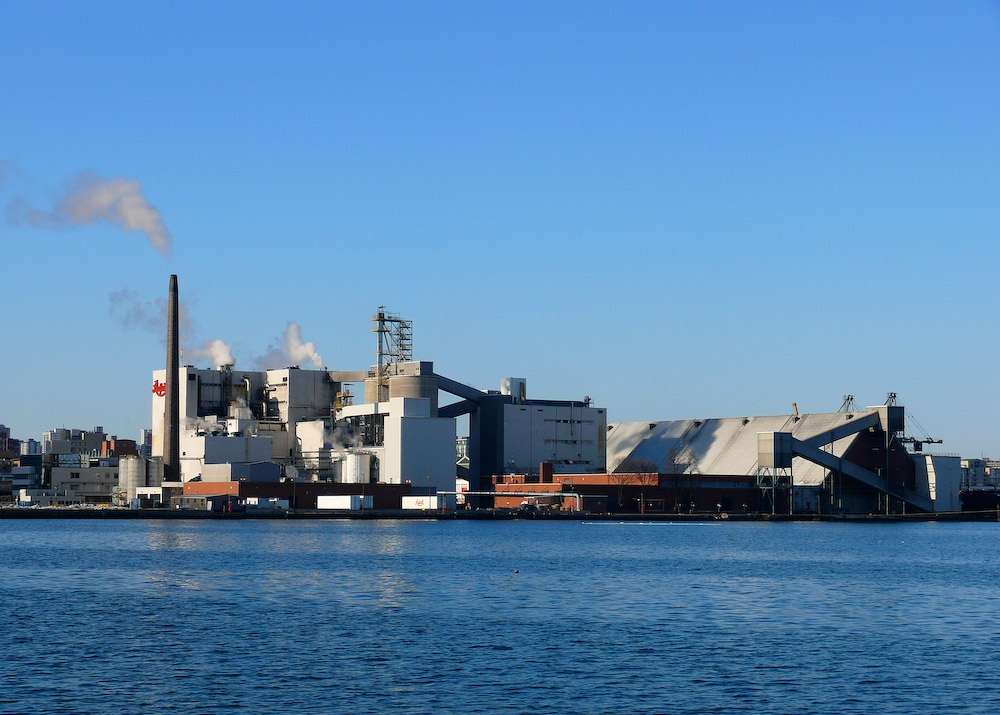
Redpath Sugar Refinery in 2008

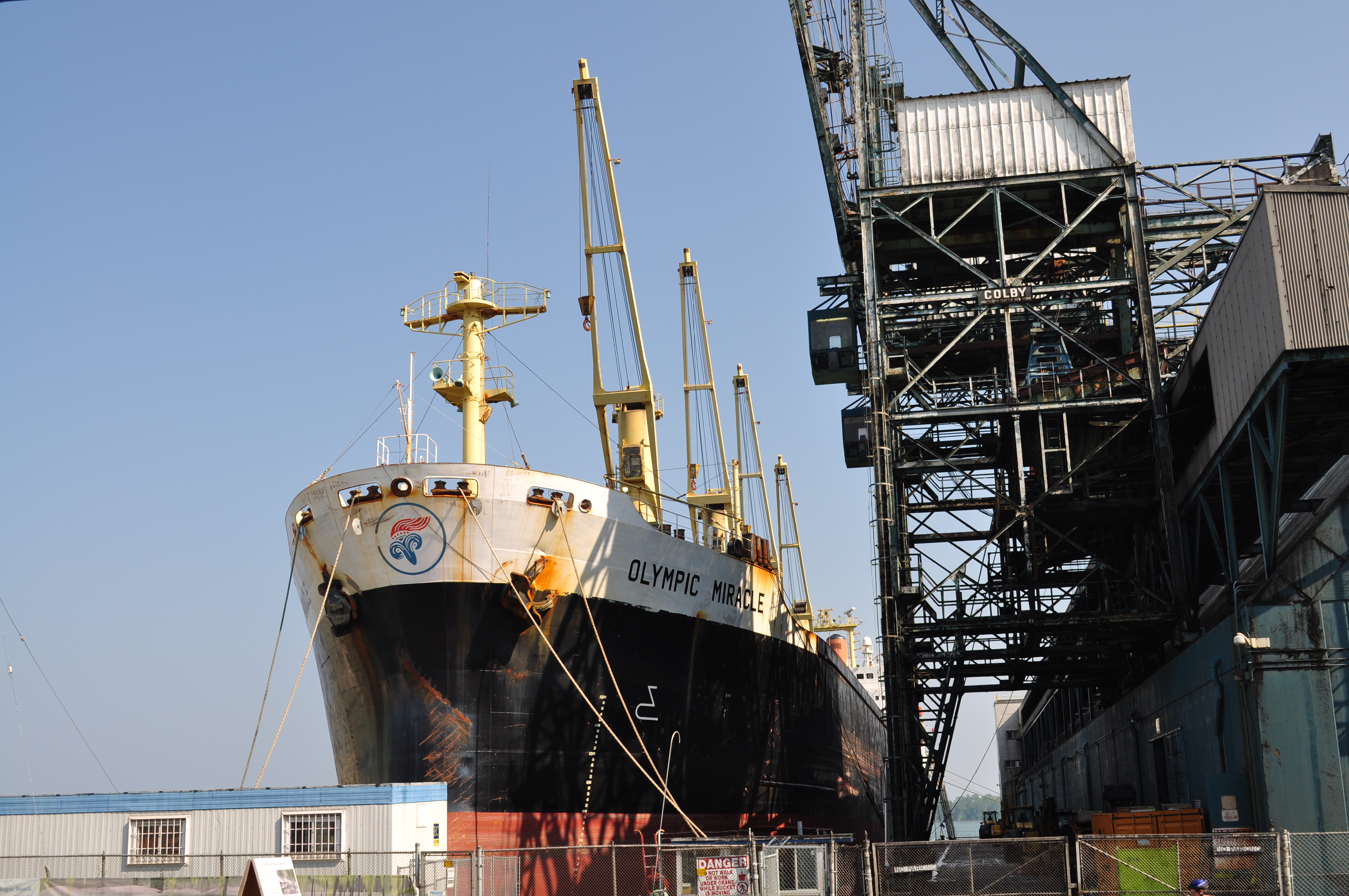
Sugar shed and raw sugar shipping vessel

The Redpath Sugar Refinery is a sugar storage, refining and museum complex in Toronto, Ontario, Canada. The site is located east of Downtown Toronto, the intersection of Queens Quay and Jarvis Street.

== Buildings ==
The complex, opened in 1958, houses the storage and refining plant of Toronto-based Redpath Sugar. The complex consists of Building 1 (eight floors), a chimney stack, and Building 2 (five floors), which houses the sugar museum. The sugar processed at the plant originates in the Caribbean and Brazil, and is delivered by ships using the Saint Lawrence Seaway. Due to the limited shipping season, sugar cane is stockpiled each fall in facilities next to the processing plant.

In 2006, the red illuminated "Redpath Sugar" sign that adorned the north side of the building was taken down and replaced with a sign (since removed) for Tate & Lyle, the owner at that time (Redpath is now owned by American Sugar Refining). The Redpath signage on the west side of the building is still intact. The north-facing wall of the Raw Sugar Shed features a whale mural by artist Wyland.

== Redpath Sugar Museum ==
Since 1979, Redpath has operated the Redpath Sugar Museum in the building, with exhibits about the refining of sugar and making of sugar products. The museum is affiliated with the Canadian Museums Association, Canadian Heritage Information Network, and Virtual Museum of Canada.

== See also ==
- Harbourfront – neighbourhood in Toronto
- Peter Redpath
- Redpath Museum
- Sugar Beach
- Toronto Harbour
