= John Redpath =

Canadian businessman

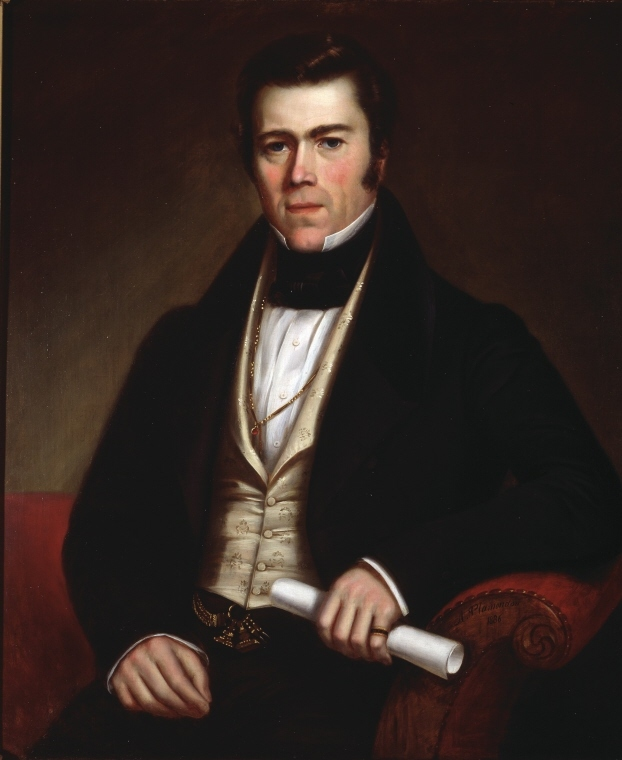
- Born: 1796; Earlston, Scotland
- Died: March 5, 1869 (aged 72–73); Montreal, Quebec, Canada
- Resting place: Mount Royal Cemetery
- Known for: Founder of Redpath Sugar. Builder of the Redpath Museum and the Redpath Library
- Spouse(s): Janet McPhee, Jane Drummond
- Children: Peter Redpath (1821-1894), John James Redpath (1834-1884), Janet Redpath (1825-1828), George Drummond Redpath (1835-1877), Francis Robert Redpath (1846-1928), Augusta Elenaor Redpath (1850-1910), Harriet Ina Redpath (1855-1858), Mary Redpath (1823-1893), Helen Redpath (1827-1883)
- Relatives: Sir George Drummond

John Redpath (1796 – March 5, 1869) was a Scots-Quebecer businessman and philanthropist who helped pioneer the industrial movement that made Montreal, Quebec, the largest and most prosperous city in Canada.

== Early years ==
In 1796, John Redpath was born at Earlston, Berwickshire. According to surviving records, he was the son of Peter Redpath, a farm worker, and his second wife Elizabeth Pringle, from neighbouring Gordon, Berwickshire. Redpath was born during the period of the Lowland Clearances that created economic hardship and dislocation for many Scottish families. As such, after gaining valuable experience as a stonemason with George Drummond in Edinburgh, the twenty-year-old Redpath emigrated to Canada.

In 1816, with limited funds for ship passage, the nearly penniless Redpath disembarked at Quebec City before walking barefoot to Montreal. Once there, he used the trade he had learnt back in Scotland to gain him employment in the construction industry, working as a stonemason. In November of that year, Redpath witnessed the first installation of oil streetlamps in the city on Rue Saint-Paul.

== Business career ==
Within a few years of arriving in Montreal, Redpath began running his own sizeable construction business. He was involved in major projects such as the construction of the Lachine Canal and locks that proved key to future commercial development of the city of Montreal. Beginning in 1689, attempts were made by the French Colonial government and several others to build a canal that would allow ships to bypass the treacherous Lachine Rapids. After more than 130 years of failure, with funding from the recently formed Bank of Montreal, the consortium, of which Redpath was a major part, was successful in its construction and the new canal officially opened in 1825.

The Lachine canal substantially increased shipping, turning Montreal into one of the largest ports in North America. Because the land along the canal belonged to the Roman Catholic Sulpician Order it remained unused for another twenty years until Redpath and other businessmen were finally able to purchase plots along the canal. As a result of the land being opened to development, on the canal's banks came the construction of large new manufacturing plants, drawn there because of the ready source of water from the canal that could be used in the production process and provide the steam power to drive machinery. It was these industries, including Redpath's construction of the first sugar refinery in Canada, that made Montreal the industrial metropolis of Canada and by the time of his death, John Redpath witnessed traffic go from 600 small vessels passing through the canal each year to more than 13,000 large ships.

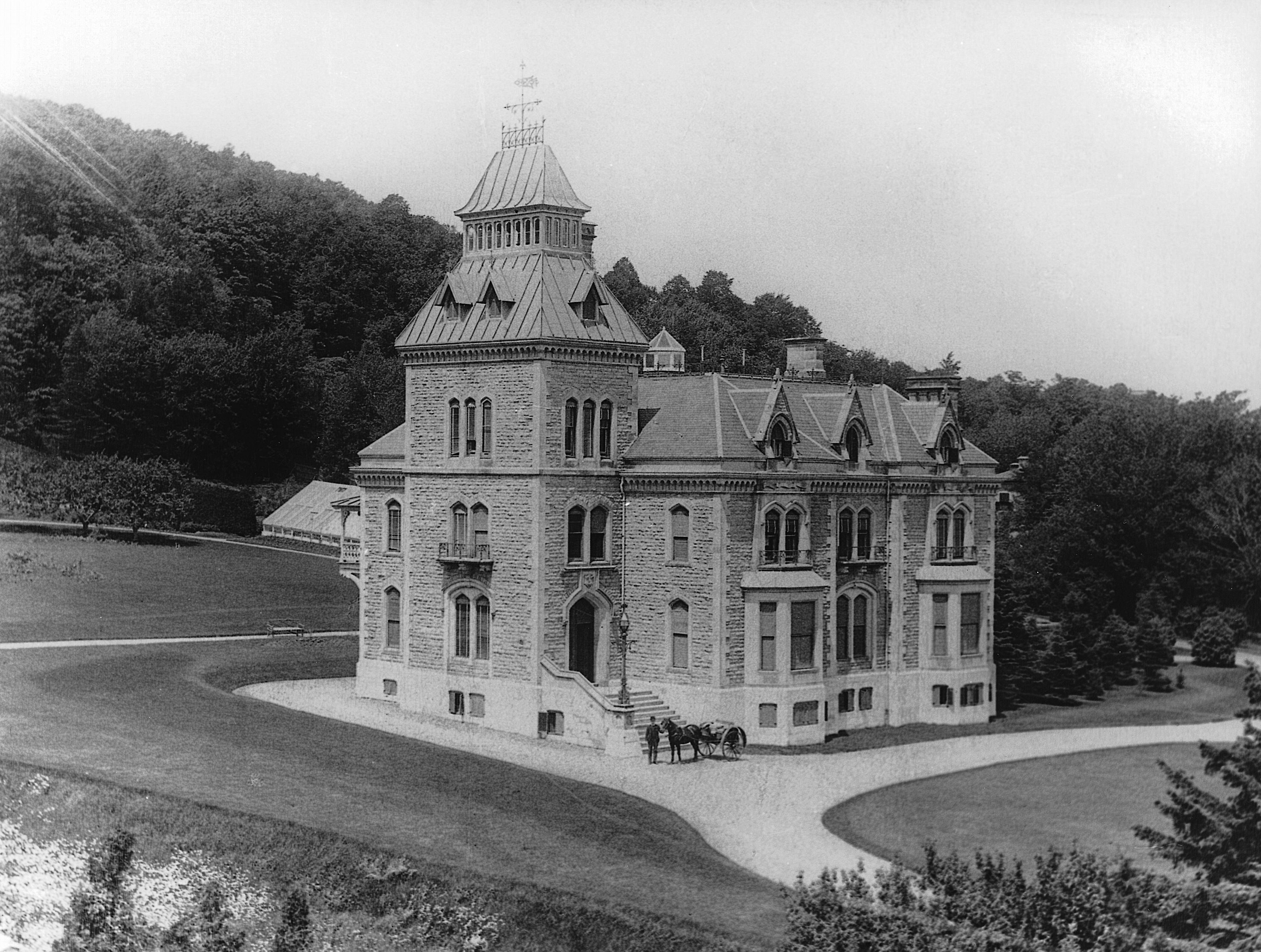
Redpath's house, Terrace Bank, on Sherbrooke Street, Montreal

John Redpath's success in building the Lachine Canal led to further major projects including his partnering with Thomas McKay, to construct the locks at Jones Falls, Ontario, on the giant Rideau Canal project between 1827 and 1828. In addition, Redpath built the Notre-Dame Basilica and some of the first buildings at McGill University.

The Redpath Sugar refinery proved to be a major Montreal employer, within a few years annually processing approximately 7,000 tons of raw sugar imported from the West Indies aboard Redpath-owned ships. Originally called the Canada Sugar Refining Co., after his son Peter (1821–1894) joined the business the company's name was changed to John Redpath & Son. Four years later in 1861, Redpath's son-in-law George Alexander Drummond (1829–1910) also joined the company.

In addition to his own industrial enterprises, Redpath invested in numerous businesses that greatly benefited the Montreal economy. In addition to his own cargo vessels to serve his sugar refinery, he had investments in the Montreal Towboat Company. He also helped finance the Montreal Telegraph Company and the Montreal Fire Assurance Company, serving as a director of both companies. He also committed substantial funds to develop the economies of Quebec's Eastern Townships, including investments in the Capel Copper operations, the Belvedere Mining and Smelting Company, Rockland Slate Company, Bear Creek Coal, and Melbourne Slate Co.

As a result of his business acumen, in 1833 Redpath was invited to serve on the board of directors of the Bank of Montreal, a position he would hold for 36 years. Canada has always had a very small population and in the developing years of the early 19th century, that small population meant there was limited financial resources for business to draw upon. Because major business development was still dependent upon funding from the London Stock Exchange, Redpath understood the need for Canada to begin the long process of developing its own capital markets. As such, he was a promoter of the Montreal Investment Association, the forerunner of the Montreal Stock Exchange.

Coming from the Scottish working class Redpath had an inherent mistrust of the aristocratic power structure in England and did not view England as the mother country as other Canadians such as Robert Baldwin did. Numerous complaints by business officials in the Canadian colony were ignored by the British authorities and the situation became intolerable when the government in London decided to abolish tariffs that protected Lower Canada producers from the established and well-financed British companies. Understanding that fighting these powerful forces in Britain was costly and nearly impossible, along with other businessmen who had invested in Canada, Redpath lent his support to the Annexation Movement in Canada in an effort to leverage the situation. This group promoted the idea of the Canadian Provinces joining the United States, an idea that had been touted on prior occasions. It had been unfair taxes and tariffs that led to the American Revolution and while the Annexation Movement was short-lived, the growing support for such an idea, particularly from powerful men like Redpath, John Molson, Louis-Joseph Papineau, and Alexander Galt, caused the British authorities to make changes that resulted in the Canadian–American Reciprocity Treaty of 1854.

== Political career and philanthropy ==
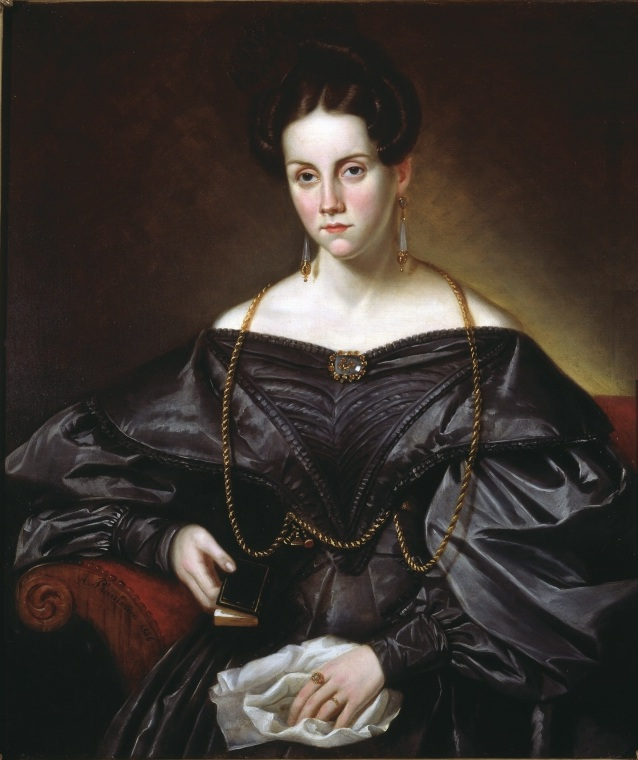
Jane Drummond

Beyond business, charity and community service played a large role in Redpath's life. He was sat on Montreal City Council from 1840 until 1843. During this time, he ceded the land which became Drummond Street on May 13, 1842, and named the street after his second wife, Jane Drummond (1816–1907). The street was not named after General Gordon Drummond (no relation), as is sometimes thought.

Redpath was also a director of such charitable institutions as the Montreal General Hospital. He was one of the founders of the Protestant House of Industry and Refuge and a major donor to the Canada Foreign Missionary Society and the French-Canadian Missionary Society. Redpath was a supporter of the 1833 law that abolished slavery in the British colonies and served as the head of a small group that lobbied for government assistance to fight Montreal's "white slavery" traffic, working with the Magdalen Asylum in Montreal to aid impoverished immigrant women forced into prostitution. Having had limited education, Redpath was a strong advocate of learning. He helped establish The Presbyterian College, Montreal and the Montreal Mechanics Institute, now the Atwater Library. John Redpath was also a benefactor of the first endowment fund established for McGill University. His son Peter also endowed a Chair of Mathematics at the university as well as building the university's Redpath Museum and Redpath Library.

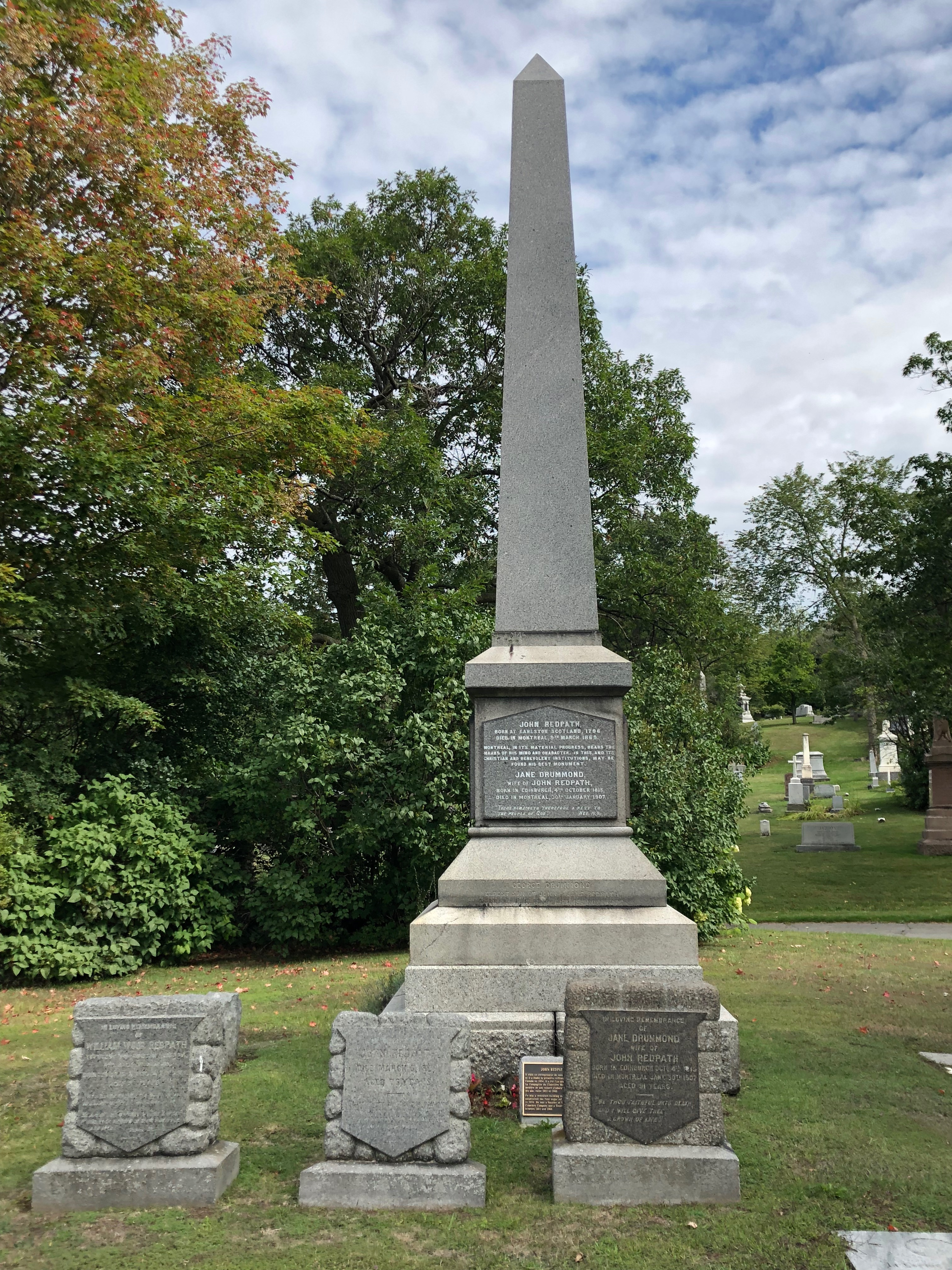
John Redpath's funeral monument in Mount Royal Cemetery.

== Personal ==
Redpath was first married, on December 19, 1818, in Montreal, Canada, to Janet McPhee, a native of Glengarry, Ontario, and they had seven children before her death in 1834. The following year, on September 11 in Kingston, Canada, he married 20-year-old Scottish-born Jane Drummond, and they had ten children. Redpath built a large family home overlooking Montreal on the slopes of Mount Royal, having purchased it from the Desrivières family who had lost a long court case against the trustees of what was to become McGill University. The area still carries the Redpath name: rue Redpath, croissant Redpath, place Redpath.

Following his death in 1869, Redpath was interred in the Mount Royal Cemetery in Montreal.

== Legacy ==
In May 2019, Toronto's poet laureate, Albert Moritz, composed a new poem that reused four lines from a poem John Redpath composed in 1858. The Redpath Sugar company had requested Moritz compose his poem to commemorate the 60th anniversary of the opening of the Redpath Sugar Refinery on Toronto's waterfront. The poem stirred controversy, and Redpath Sugar declined to have Moritz read it at the celebration ceremony because it touched on the sugar industry's early reliance on slave labour.
