= Redpath Sugar =

Canadian sugar refining company

Redpath Sugar Ltd.

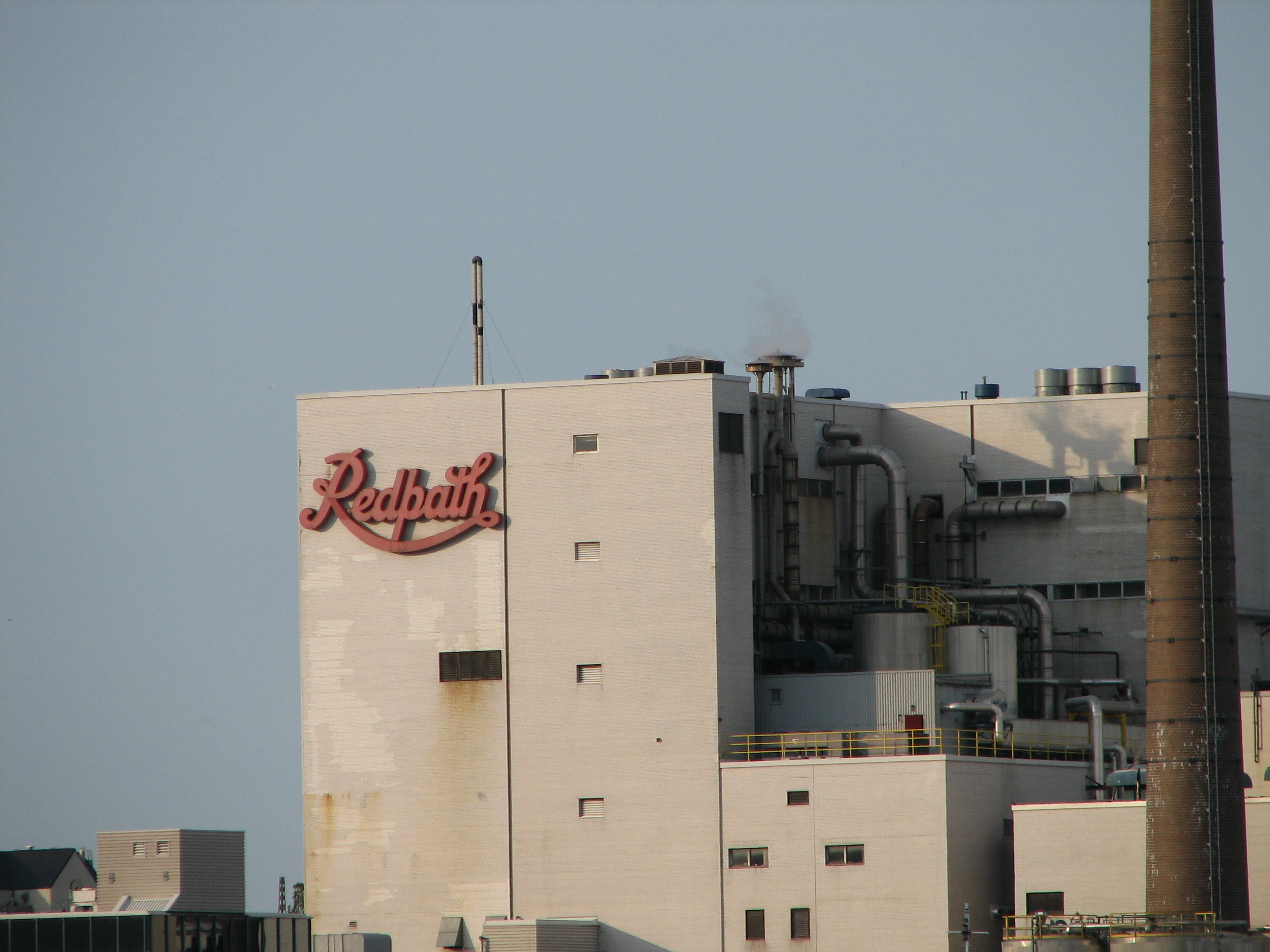
- The Redpath Sugar Refinery in Toronto
- Company type: Subsidiary
- Industry: Sugar industry
- Founded: Montreal, Quebec, Canada (1854)
- Founder: John Redpath
- Area served: Canada
- Parent: American Sugar Refining
- Website: redpathsugar.com

Redpath Sugar Ltd. (French: Sucre Redpath Ltée) is a Canadian sugar refining company that was established in 1854 and the first refining cane sugar in Montreal, Quebec. Headquartered in Toronto, Ontario (with an additional packaging plant in Belleville, Ontario), the company is a subsidiary of the multinational American Sugar Refining.

== History ==
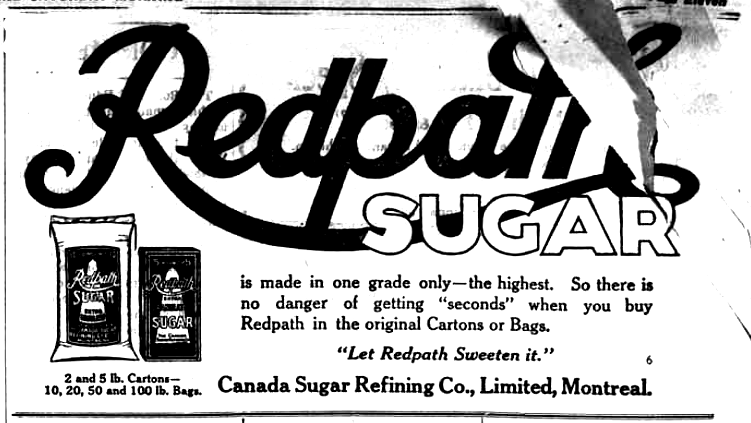
Redpath newspaper ad, 1916

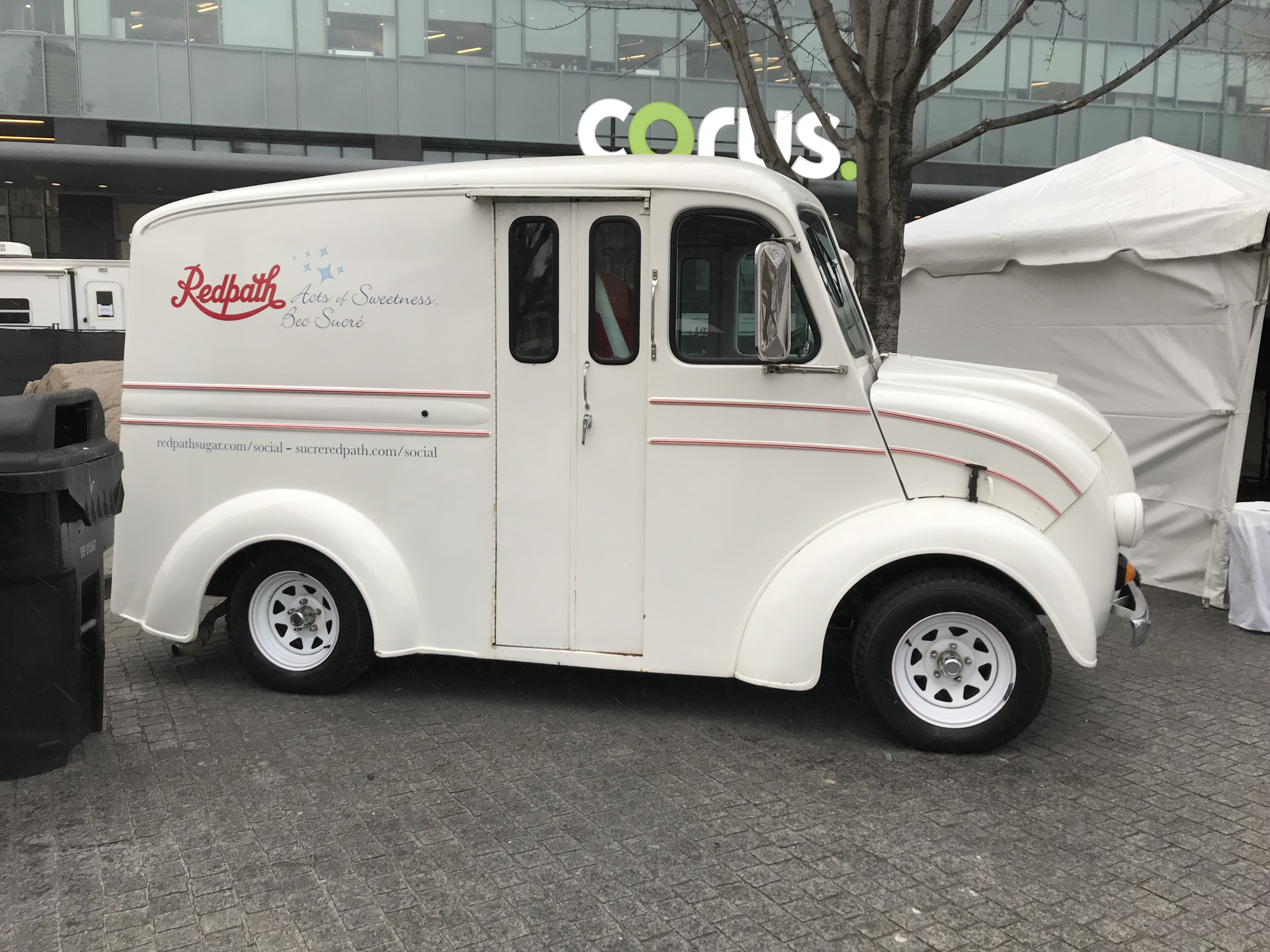
Redpath's 1947 Divco truck

The business was founded in 1854 in Montreal, Quebec, by Scots-Quebecer entrepreneur John Redpath. Located on Saint Patrick Street on the bank of the Lachine Canal, the sugar refinery complex was the first of its kind in Canada, using sugar cane imported from the British West Indies. Its construction was part of the economic boom that, during the 19th century, turned Montreal from a small town to (then) the largest city in Canada and the country's economic engine.

In 1857, John Redpath's eldest son, Peter, became a partner; his brother-in-law, George Alexander Drummond, joined the firm in 1861. Unable to compete with the giant low-cost producers in the United States, for the three years between 1876 and 1878, the company ceased operations.

Following the tariff protections implemented under the National Policy by the government of John A. Macdonald, the company reopened in 1879, as did St. Lawrence Sugar, a new competitor established in Montreal. At that time, the company was reorganized as the Canada Sugar Refining Company Limited. George Drummond took over when Peter Redpath retired in 1888. Under his guidance, the company's success allowed for construction of a new six-storey plant built on the existing site, doubling production capacity.

In 1930, the company merged with the Dominion Sugar Company Limited of Chatham, Ontario, and became known as the Canada and Dominion Sugar Company Limited. In 1959, a controlling interest in the company was acquired by Tate & Lyle, a British firm. In 1973, the company changed its name to Redpath Industries Limited.

The Redpath Sugar Refinery was built on the Toronto waterfront in the late 1950s, at the time of the completion of the Saint Lawrence Seaway, and it is still in operation. Tate family member Saxon Tate and David Davis, later a senior Conservative politician, were sent from Britain to restructure its Canadian subsidiary. In 1980, the Montreal plant was closed and production was shifted to Toronto. In 2007, the company became a subsidiary of American Sugar Refining (ASR Group) following the sale of Tate & Lyle's sugar division, and it was renamed as Redpath Sugar Ltd. at that time.

== Refinery ==
The Redpath Sugar Refinery is a sugar storage, refining and museum complex in Toronto used by Redpath for sugar production. The refinery was founded in 1958 and has included a museum since 1979.

== Imagery ==
Redpath sugar label, 2004

The Redpath sugar label shown at right celebrated the company's 150th anniversary in 2004. The Redpath logo, which is derived from John Redpath's own script, is Canada's oldest continuously used food product trademark.
