= Olive Redpath =

American actress

Olive Redpath was a Victorian era stage actress who was immensely popular in the late 1890s and into the early 20th century. A star of plays, among her most highly regarded roles came in "Mother Goose" and "Naughty Anthony". The former was an extravaganza which played at Haverly's 14th Street Theatre from May 1, 1899 - May 13, 1899. She acted the part of Little Jack Horner. The latter was a comedy which ran from January 8, 1900 - March 1900 at the Herald Square Theatre, 1331 Broadway (Manhattan) and 29 West 35th Street, New York City. Produced by David Belasco, Redpath was noteworthy in newspaper reviews for her short frocks. She played the role of "Winnie".

Redpath replaced Miss Sylvia in the title role of The French Maid in February 1898. In "That Man", a farce performed at the Herald Square Theatre in January 1899, she entertained as a "grass widow" (divorcee) in various disguises.
