= William Christopher Macdonald =

Sir William Macdonald
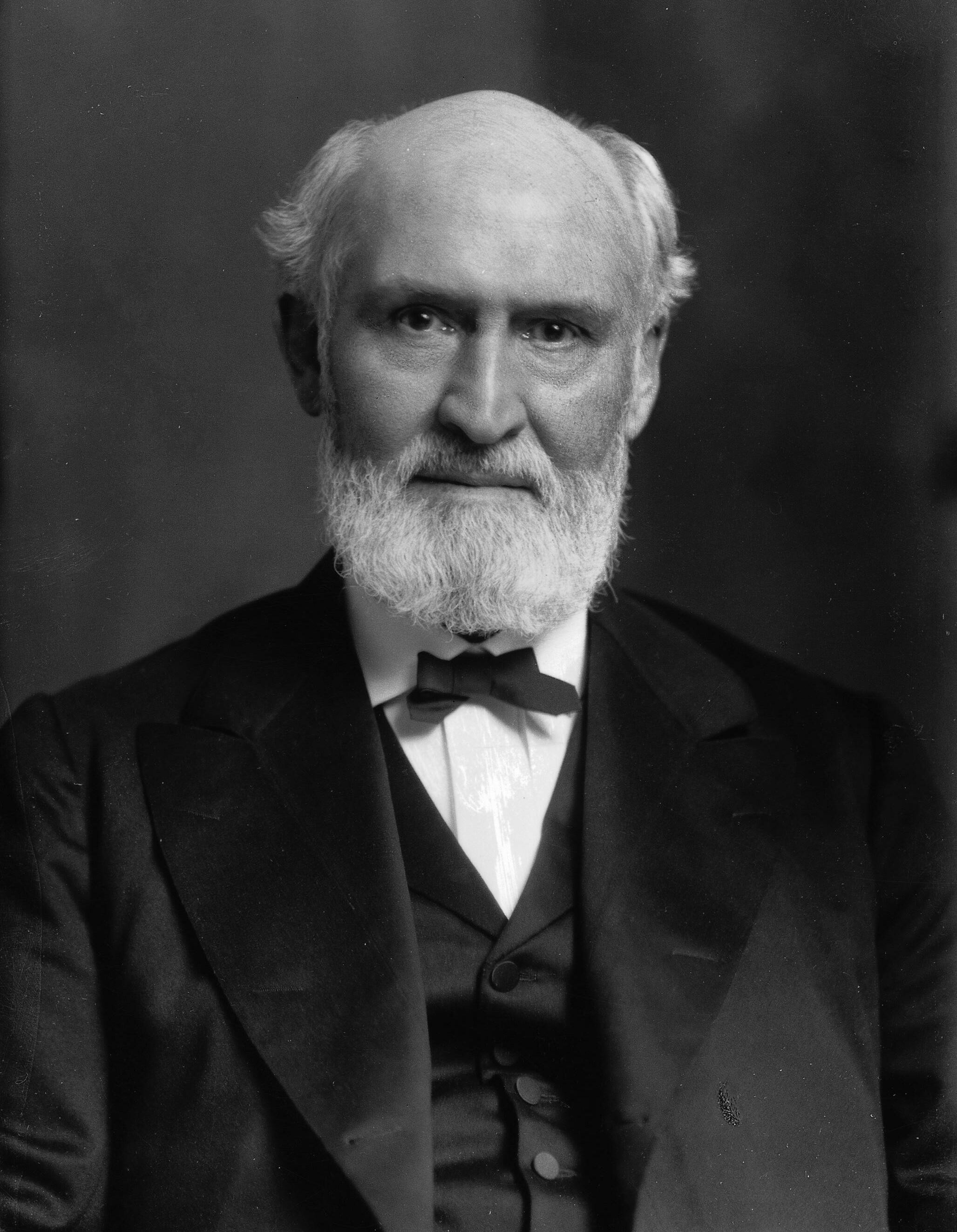

4th Chancellor of McGill University
- In office 1914–1917

Personal details
- Born: 10 February 1831 Glenaladale, Prince Edward Island
- Died: 9 June 1917 (aged 86) Montreal, Quebec
- Education: Central Academy (later Prince of Wales College)
- Occupation: merchant, tobacco manufacturer, and philanthropist

Sir William Christopher Macdonald (10 February 1831 – 9 June 1917) was a Canadian tobacco manufacturer and major education philanthropist in Canada. Though born in Prince Edward Island, he is considered a Scots-Quebecer.

== Early life and career ==
Born William Christopher McDonald in 1831 at Tracadie, in what was then the British Colony of Prince Edward Island, he was sixth of seven children of The Hon. Donald Macdonald (1795-1854) and Anna Matilda (1797-1877), daughter of The Hon. Ralph Brecken. In 1772, as a consequence of the Jacobite Rebellion, Macdonald's paternal grandfather, John MacDonald of Glenaladale, the 8th laird of Glenaladale (of the MacDonalds of Clan Ranald), purchased more than 20,000 acres (8,100 ha) of land in Prince Edward Island for settlement by more than 200 members of his Roman Catholic clan. Known today as the Glenaladale Settlers, in Canada the family name had been recorded as McDonald, which he maintained until 1898, when he began using the historical Scottish spelling but without capitalizing the "d".

As a youth, Macdonald rebelled against the authoritarian rule of his father and his Roman Catholic upbringing. Although his mother was Protestant, Macdonald and his siblings were raised in the Roman Catholic faith. At the age of sixteen he renounced the church, choosing to become a non-practising Christian. At eighteen he left his Island home, making his way to the United States, where he found clerical work in Boston. Although he had limited education, Macdonald quickly showed an entrepreneurial spirit and, joined by his brother Augustine, he organized himself as a broker to handle the shipping of American-made goods to merchants in his native Prince Edward Island. However, after a ship carrying some of his merchandise sank in an ocean storm, the venture had severe problems and Macdonald closed the business and left Boston.

== Tobacco enterprise and the American Civil War ==
The Macdonald brothers moved to the then Province of Canada where they settled in Montreal, a city that was then undergoing an economic boom. There, they made a living as brokers, earning commissions from the resale of a variety of products until 1858 when they opened McDonald Brothers and Co., a company that made tobacco products. The business procured tobacco leaf from suppliers in the southern United States that was converted to pipe and chewing tobacco at their small Montreal facility.

While the use of tobacco products was growing in popularity, the American Civil War afforded the fledgling company an opportunity that brought enormous financial success, leading to Macdonald Brothers becoming the preeminent company in the field in Canada. Virtually all of the tobacco growers were located in states that were part of the Confederacy and with the onset of the war, the northern states faced a huge shortage of tobacco leaf. Because Macdonald's company was in Canada, he was able to buy the leaf from the South and have it brought by ocean cargo vessels to Montreal. There, it was processed then the finished product was shipped to the tobacco-starved market in the northern United States.

Despite the fortune that Macdonalds' tobacco made, Macdonald himself often said that he was ashamed of his business, seeing smoking as a "filthy and disgusting habit and even forbade its consumption in his presence", and referring to his shame as a source of his philanthropy. That was also perhaps why his company's slogan was "Tobacco with a heart".

== Postbellum career and philanthropic activities ==
At the end of the Civil War, the company continued to prosper and by the early 1870s, it had more than five hundred employees. During this period, Macdonald bought out his brother's stock position and soon began using the great wealth he had earned to undertake philanthropic endeavors.

Macdonald's philanthropic efforts at McGill University began because of his close relationship with John William Dawson, the principal of the university at the time. Macdonald, never having had a family of his own, soon became extremely fond of the whole Dawson family. In fact, he would later build the Macdonald-Harrington building (currently houses the Department of Architecture) in honor of Dawson's daughter Anna marrying the university geologist and future head of the chemistry department, Bernard J. Harrington.

In 1870, he provided the funding for ten scholarships to McGill University, a program that continues to this day. However, this marked only a small beginning of the massive funding he would bestow on the university where he would serve on the Board of Governors for more than thirty years. His generosity paid for the cost to construct buildings at McGill University to house new chemistry and physics departments, and, jointly with fellow Montrealer Thomas Workman, the engineering building. In each of these cases, for a time, Macdonald even bore the faculty costs for the new departments as government funding was limited. When the university's engineering building burned down, Macdonald paid the costs to rebuild it. That building was named in his honor. As a result of these expanded facilities, the university began to establish an international reputation that would attract the likes of Ernest Rutherford to teach and where he did the work which earned him the 1908 Nobel Prize in Chemistry.

When real estate developers purchased the property at the southwest corner of the University campus to build a hotel, Macdonald stepped in and bought the property at a premium then gave it to the university. However, to ensure McGill was not subjected to other unwanted commercial development that would limit the university's future growth, he purchased and donated 25 acres (100,000 m^{2}) north of the main campus which became the site for Molson Stadium, the gymnasium, and Douglas Hall.

Macdonald's love of nature and rural life led to his establishing a new type of specialized school in cooperation with Dr. James W. Robertson, the then Commissioner of Agriculture and Dairying for the Government of Canada. Built in Quebec, the Maritime Provinces and Ontario, and aimed at those wanting to make their living in rural agriculture environments, these school's curriculum included manual training programmes, domestic sciences, and horticulture. Concurrently, Macdonald established a training fund for agricultural teachers but this first interest in agricultural studies soon led to the creation of his most important legacy. From fellow Montreal businessman Robert Reford, in 1904 Macdonald purchased three farm properties in an area on the western end of Montreal Island known as Sainte-Anne-de-Bellevue. On the 300 acres (1.2 km^{2}), he planned and built Macdonald College, an agriculture training institute. Constructed in 1905-06 and opened in the fall of 1907, the large multi-building facility's entire construction and furnishing costs were funded entirely by Macdonald who also provided a $2 million operating endowment. In his will, he left the college a further $1 million for the operating fund. It is now part of McGill University and houses its Faculty of Agricultural and Environmental Sciences, School of Dietetics and Human Nutrition, and the McGill School of Environment.

Macdonald was one of the major stockholders in the Bank of Montreal and served on its boards of directors. Beyond his philanthropic gifts for education purposes, he also donated substantial funds to the Montreal General Hospital. Just as rural life was important to him, so was the city and he served as a volunteer director of the Montreal Parks and Playgrounds Association. Named President and Chancellor of McGill University in early 1914, Macdonald also provided funding to create McGill University College of British Columbia which ultimately became the University of British Columbia.

== Legacy ==
Macdonald died in 1917 and was interred in the Mount Royal Cemetery in Montreal. A proponent of bilingualism, his will established travelling fellowships for the McGill University Faculty of Law that paid the costs for English-speaking Quebec lawyers to study the French language and the history of the French Civil Code in France. The money Macdonald donated to philanthropic causes was unparalleled in the history of Canada yet despite his wealth and good works, he remained a humble man who avoided publicity. He was deeply proud of his Scottish heritage, and the image of a Scottish lass has adorned the packaging of Macdonald tobacco products for nearly a century. However, Macdonald personally disliked tobacco and admitted to feeling ashamed that he made a living from such a business. Five years after his death, his company expanded its facilities to the mass production of cigarettes.

A lifelong bachelor, Macdonald bequeathed his tobacco company to Walter and Howard Stewart, the two sons of company manager David Stewart. The company remained in the Stewart family until 1973 when David M. Stewart (1920–1984) sold it to the American tobacco giant R. J. Reynolds Tobacco Company and used the proceeds to establish the Macdonald Stewart Foundation for charitable causes. Macdonald and/or the Macdonald Stewart Foundation funded the following facilities at McGill University:

- Macdonald Campus – until 1971 known as Macdonald College.
- Macdonald Engineering Building
- Macdonald-Harrington Building
- Macdonald-Stewart Library Building (formerly Macdonald Physics Building)
- Stewart Biological Sciences Building
- Macdonald Park (the land on which several buildings including the Molson Stadium, McConnell Arena, Currie Gymnasium and upper campus residences are located)
- Two Sir William C. Macdonald Chairs in the Law Faculty

Macdonald also founded and funded the Macdonald Institute (c. 1903) at the University of Guelph, as well as the Macdonald Hall women's residence, now the main building for the Gordon S. Lang School of Business and Economics.

Academic offices
Preceded by Lord Strathcona	Chancellor of McGill University; 1914–1917	Succeeded by Robert Borden
