= George Alexander Drummond =

Scottish-Canadian businessman and senator (1829 – 1910)

The Honourable Sir George A. Drummond, KCMG, CVO
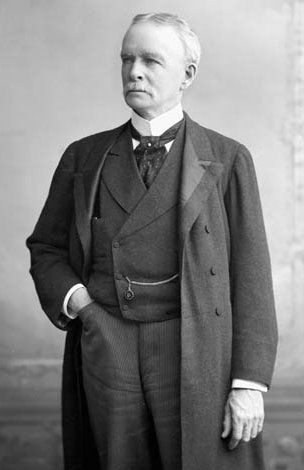

12th President of the Bank of Montreal
- In office 1905–1910
- Preceded by: Donald Smith, 1st Baron Strathcona and Mount Royal
- Succeeded by: Richard B. Angus

Senator for Kennebec, Quebec
- In office 1888–1910
- Preceded by: The Hon. Pierre-Étienne Fortin
- Succeeded by: The Hon. Louis Lavergne

Personal details
- Born: 11 October 1829 Edinburgh, Scotland
- Died: 2 February 1910 (aged 80) Montreal, Quebec
- Resting place: Mount Royal Cemetery
- Party: Conservative
- Education: University of Edinburgh

Sir George Alexander Drummond, KCMG CVO (11 October 1829 – 2 February 1910) was a Scottish-Canadian businessman and senator.

== Life and career ==
Born in 1829 at Edinburgh, he was a younger son of the entrepreneurial stonemason, building contractor and city councillor, George Drummond, by his wife Margaret Pringle (b.c.1790). Drummond studied chemistry at Edinburgh University before coming to Montreal in 1854 to work for his brother-in-law, John Redpath, at Redpath Sugar.

He married John Redpath's daughter, becoming a co-director of the family business with Peter Redpath, John's son. After the death of his first wife in 1884, he re-married Grace Parker, widow of the Rev. George Hamilton (brother of John Hamilton). Lady Drummond served as the first president of the Montreal National Council of Women of Canada, as well as President and co-founding member of the Women's Canadian Club with Elsie Reford. She is most famously known for her work with the Red Cross.

In 1888, he was summoned to the Senate of Canada, representing the senatorial division of Kennebec, Quebec. He served until his death in 1910. From 1887 to 1896, he was a vice-president at Bank of Montreal and then served as its president, first as the de facto president from 1897 and officially starting in 1905.

He helped found the St. Margaret's Home for Incurables in 1894, purchasing the house that had previously been built for Sir William Collis Meredith. As a member of the Citizen's League, he sought to improve life in Montreal, and he served as president of the Royal Edward Institute, a dispensary for the prevention of tuberculosis, founded in 1909 by Jeffrey Hale Burland (1861–1914). His recreations were mirrored in other positions he held, including as the first president of the Royal Canadian Golf Association (1895) and president of the Art Association of Montreal.

He was made a Knight Commander of the Order of St Michael and St George in 1904 and a Commander of the Royal Victorian Order in 1908. He and his wife built a house on Sherbrooke Street in Montreal's Golden Square Mile. They also kept a summer home (Gads Hill) at Cacouna, Quebec and an estate (Huntlywood), in the part of the Island of Montreal now known as Beaconsfield, where they raised pure-breds and kept a private golf course for their friends. He died in 1910 and is buried in Mount Royal Cemetery.

== Electoral record ==
1872 Canadian federal election: Montreal West
Party	Candidate	Votes
Liberal	John Young	2,138
Unknown	George Alexander Drummond	1,322
Source: Canadian Elections Database

Drummond's crypt in Mount Royal Cemetery

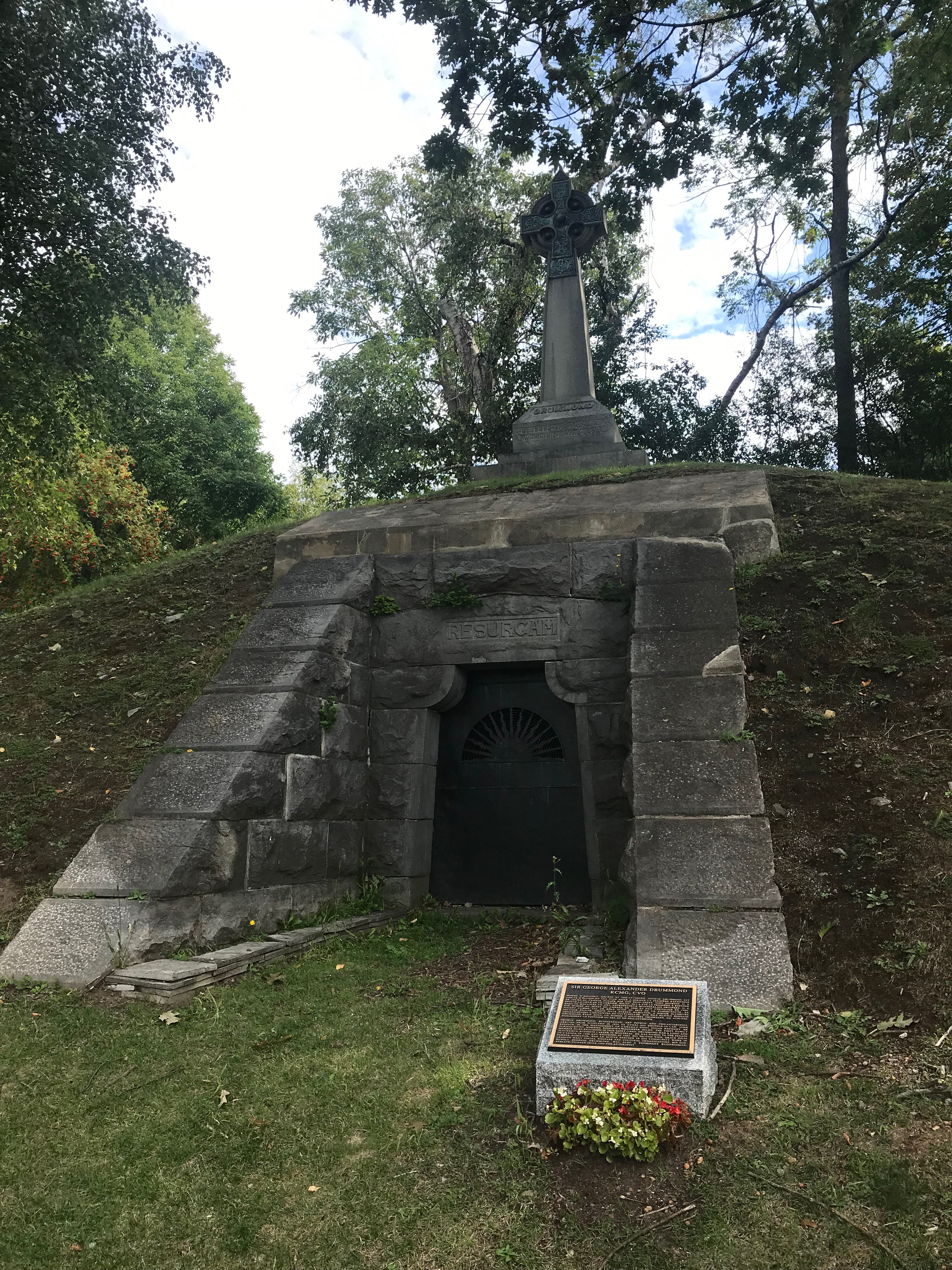

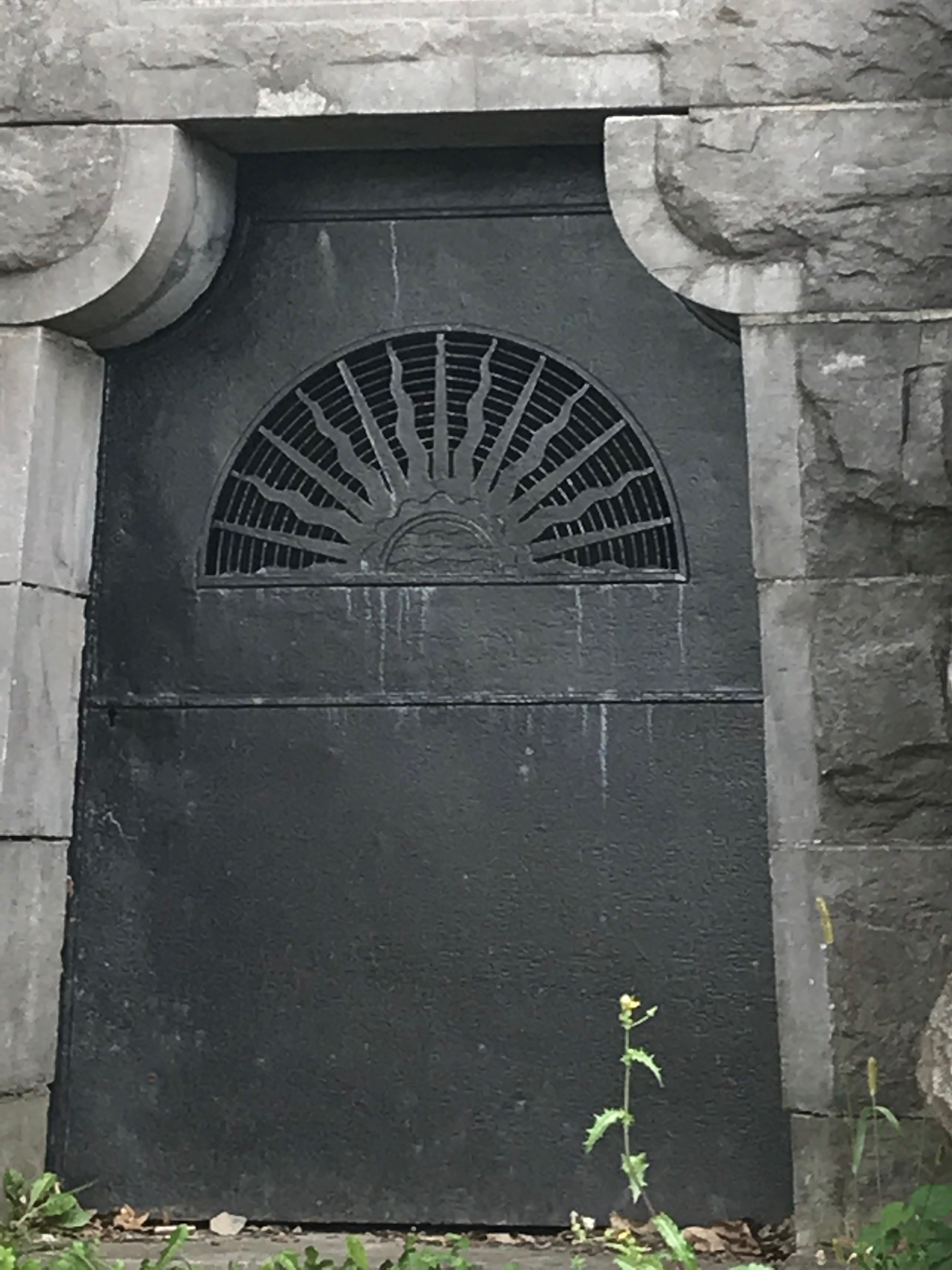

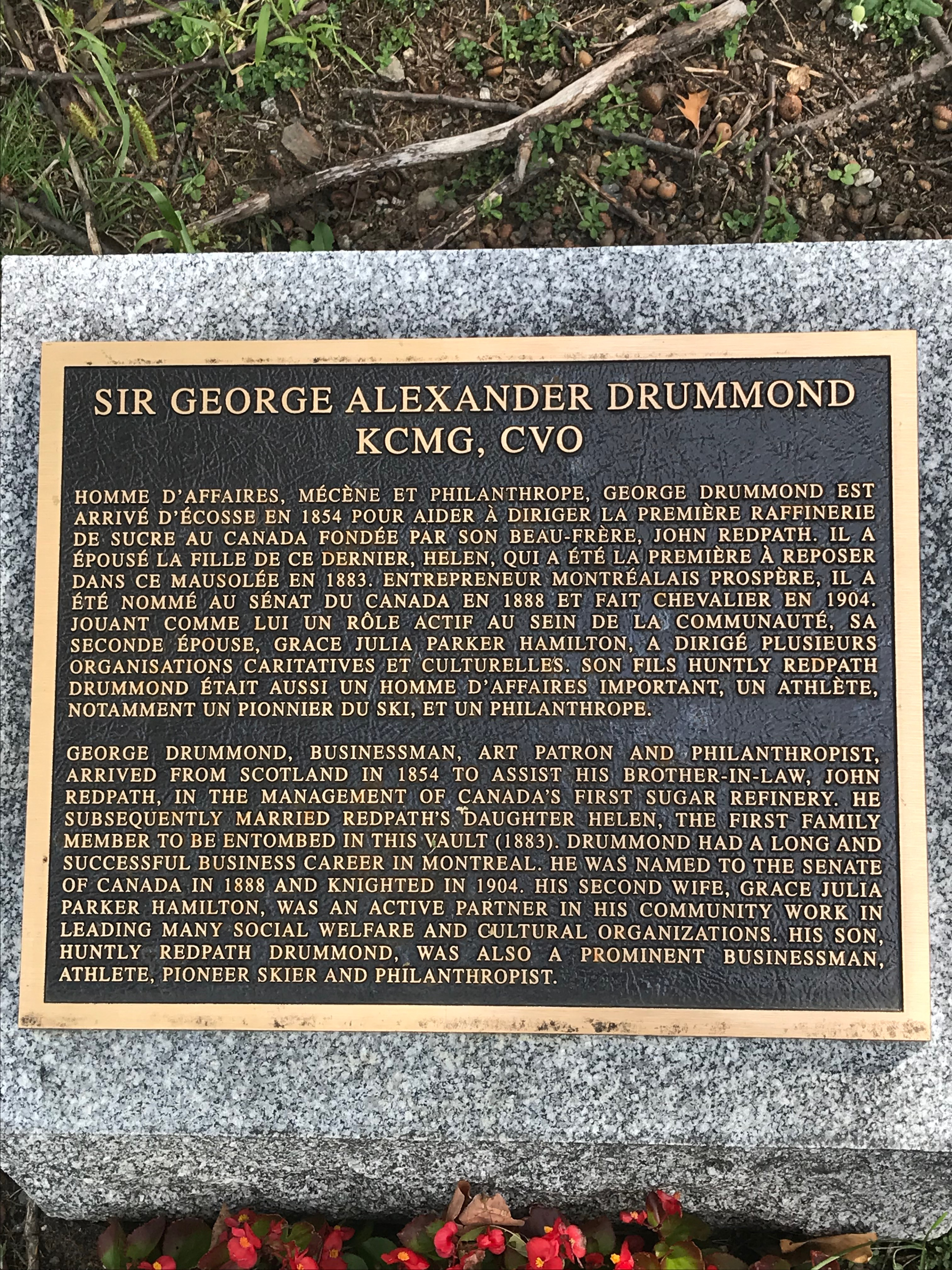

Business positions
Preceded by Donald Smith	President of the Bank of Montreal; 1905-1910	Succeeded by Richard B. Angus
