= Duncan McIntyre (businessman) =

Scots-Quebecer businessman (1834–1894)

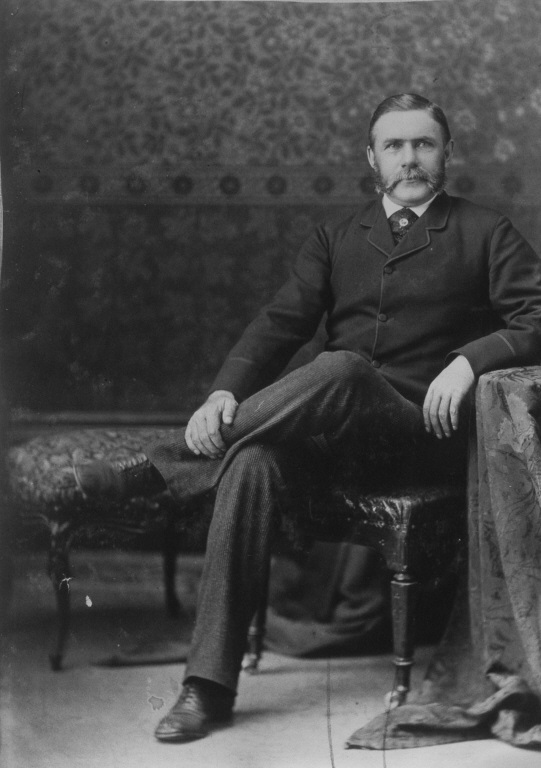
- Born: 23 December 1834; Callander, Perthshire
- Died: 13 June 1894 (aged 59); Craguie Montreal
- Spouse: Jane Allan Cassils

Duncan McIntyre (23 December 1834 – 13 June 1894) was a Scots-Quebecer businessman from Callander noted for his participation in the Canadian Pacific Railway syndicate of 1880 and as a founder of the Bell Telephone Company of Canada.

The Canada Central Railway was owned by McIntyre who amalgamated it with the CPR and became one of the handful of officers of the newly formed CPR. The CCR started in Brockville and extended to Pembroke. It then followed a westward route along the Ottawa River passing through places such as Cobden and Deux Rivières, and eventually to Mattawa, at the confluence of the Mattawa and Ottawa rivers. It then proceeded cross-country towards its final destination, Callander.

McIntyre and his contractor James Worthington led the CCR expansion. Worthington remained with the CPR for about a year until he left the company. McIntyre's nephew, John Ferguson, staked out the future North Bay, Ontario after getting assurance from his uncle and Worthington that it would be the divisional point and a location of some importance.

The CPR started its westward expansion from Bonfield, Ontario (previously called Callander Station) where the first spike was driven into a sunken railway tie. Bonfield, Ontario was inducted into Canadian Railway Hall of Fame in 2002 as the CPR First Spike location. That was the point where the Canada Central Railway extension ended.

== Family ==
He married Jane Allan Cassils and they were the parents of four sons and three daughters,

- William McIntyre
- John McIntyre
- Duncan McIntyre
- Charles McIntyre
- Mary Fisher McIntyre. She married her first cousin, Archibald Arthur Hodgson (1869-1960), one of the five well-known sons of Jonathan Hodgson (1827-1914) and Margaret Cassils. Their son, Duncan, married Hylda, daughter of J. K. L. Ross, of Montreal.
- Margaret McIntyre, married R. Archibald Snowball, of Chatham, New Brunswick. He was a younger son of The Hon. Jabez Bunting Snowball, Lieutenant Governor of New Brunswick. Their only child, Robbie, died unmarried at Montreal.
- Jane McIntyre, married Lewis Reford, son of Robert Wilson Reford (1831-1913).

== Residence ==
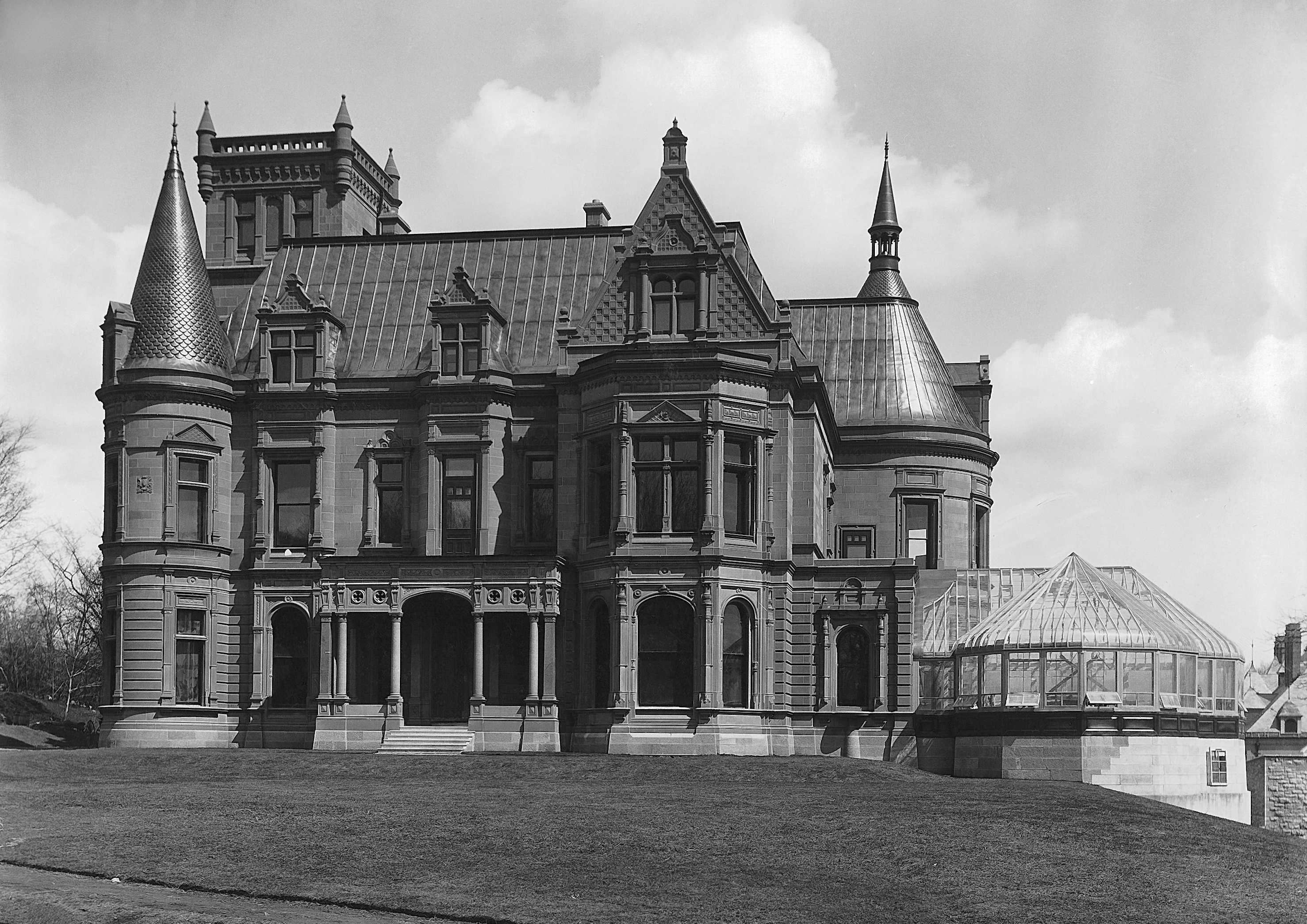
Craguie, circa 1890

In the 1880s, McIntyre commissioned architect William Thomas to design a residence for him on a ten-acre plot within the Golden Square Mile. Known as Craguie, the mansion was demolished in 1930. In 1947, his family donated the land to McGill University, for an area known as McIntyre Park. In 1965, the university completed construction of the McIntyre Medical Sciences Building, named in his honour. The McIntyre site is also home to the Stewart Biological Sciences Building.
