= Peter Redpath =

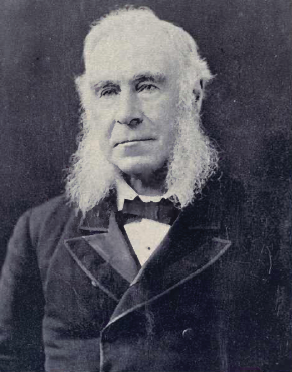
- Born: August 1, 1821; Montreal, Lower Canada
- Died: February 1, 1894 (aged 72); Chislehurst, England
- Known for: Businessman and philanthropist

Peter Redpath (August 1, 1821 – February 1, 1894) was a Canadian businessman and philanthropist, closely associated with Redpath Sugar.

== Biography ==
Redpath was born in Montreal, Lower Canada, the son of a Scottish immigrant, John Redpath, a director of the Bank of Montreal and a member of the Montreal City Council.

Redpath worked in the family's sugar refinery and other businesses in Montreal. He was a member of the McGill University Board of Governors from 1864 until his death. He endowed a chair of Natural Philosophy at McGill in 1871 and established the Redpath Museum in 1880. In the same year, he migrated to England. He also founded the Redpath Library at the university in 1893. He donated about half a million dollars in money and books to McGill University.

=== Family ===
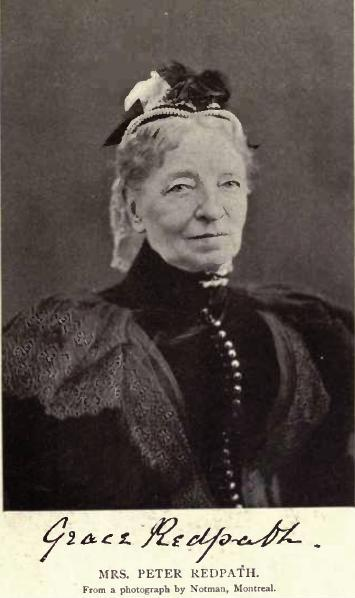
Grace Redpath by William Notman

Redpath married Grace Wood on October 16, 1847: she was the daughter of William Wood, a merchant and philanthropist, of Bowdon, Cheshire, and was educated privately. The couple lived in Montreal until they retired to Chislehurst, Kent in the 1870s. Redpath died on February 1, 1894, aged 73, and was buried in the St. Nicholas Churchyard in Chislehurst.

His widow contributed $11,500 in 1894 for Redpath Museum expenses and $40,500 for the maintenance an expansion of the Redpath Library at McGill University, which was completed in 1894. A portrait and bust of Redpath, and a portrait of his wife, were placed by the governors of McGill University in its main gallery.

== See also ==
- Redpath Sugar
