= Estevan Lodge =

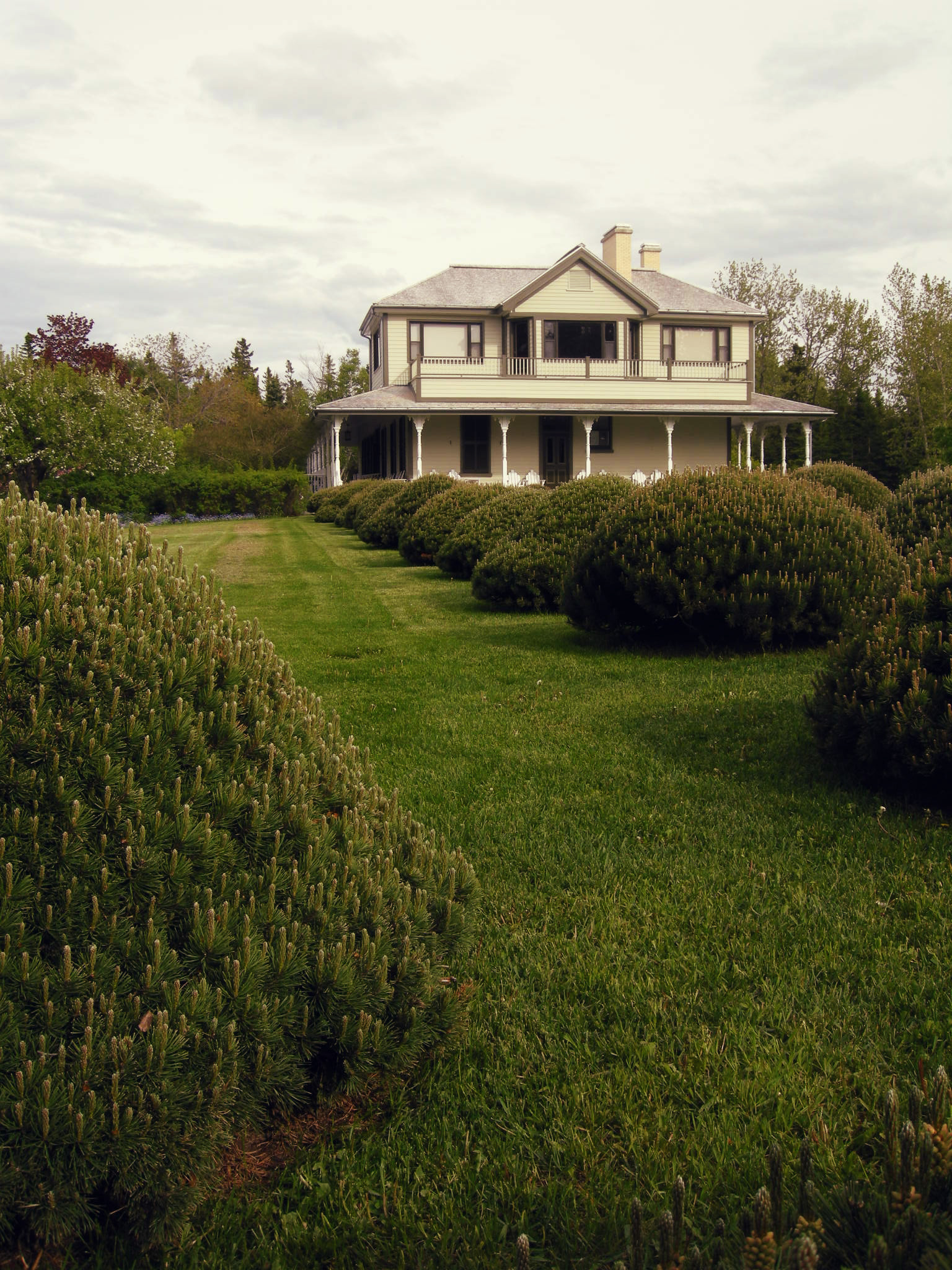
- Estevan Lodge, 2009
- Interactive map of the Estevan Lodge area

General information
- Type: Holiday cottage
- Location: 200, route 132, Grand-Métis
- Coordinates: 48.6302°N 68.1288°W
- Construction started: 1887
- Completed: 1887
- Client: George Stephen, 1st Baron Mount Stephen

Technical details
- Floor count: 2 floors

Design and construction
- Architect: William Tutin Thomas
- Main contractor: Simon Peters

Estevan Lodge, located in the Reford Gardens (Jardins de Métis) in eastern Quebec, is a stately summer home, in Bas-Saint-Laurent, Quebec.

== History ==
In October 1886, George Stephen purchased the river and seigneury of Métis from Judge U. J. Tessier for $20,000. He then commissioned his architect, William Tutin Thomas, to design a secondary residence for him in Métis. Villa Estevan was built during the summer of 1887 by general contractor Simon Peters of Quebec City. "Estevan" was the cable code Stephen used for his confidential communications with the General Manager of the CPR, William Cornelius Van Horne. Located near the Mitis River, the building has long been used as a fishing lodge. After the death of his wife in 1896, Stephen never returned to Grand-Métis, feeling incapable of fishing without her at his side. Since he had no children of his own, he loaned Estevan Lodge to his business associates and his family. For several of American’s wealthiest men, Estevan Lodge was a favourite fishing haunt. And one of the most frequent visitors was Stephen’ niece, Elsie Reford.

In 1926, Elsie Reford enlarged the house to the designs of Montreal architect, Galt Durnford. These majestic entrance doors are made of B.C. Fir, like much of the interior of the house. The second story of the house was modified to create private quarters for Elsie and Robert Reford and to accommodate her sewing room and his darkroom. The kitchen was enlarged and the building extended to expand quarters for domestic staff. In total, the Estevan Lodge has 37 rooms.

Known for many years as the Villa Reford, the house was re-baptized Estevan Lodge after its restoration in 2003.

Today the second story of the house is dedicated to a permanent exhibition chronicling the life of Elsie and Robert Reford and George Stephen, and the history of Estevan Lodge and the region. The darkroom contains an exhibition of photographs of members of the Reford family. You can enter Elsie Reford’s room, where some of her possessions and clothing are on display. The visit continues in the domestics quarters, where exhibits illustrate life in the region at the turn of the end of the nineteenth century. Estevan Lodge hosts temporary exhibitions every summer, exploring botanical art, the history of the gardens, the beauty of plants or featuring the work of one or more artists.

Formerly bedrooms, the rooms on the ground floor are now all sorts of events, meetings, meals, weddings and conferences. The purpose of the dining room was respected: the restaurant of the Villa Estevan offers visitors a menu with flavours and colours of the gardens.

== Sources ==
- Jardins de Métis, Les guides des jardins du Québec, Éditions Fides, texte d'Alexander Reford, traduction d'Albert Beaudry.
- refordgardens.com
- "Résidence princière (Métis)". L'électeur (Newspaper) (in French). Vol. 7, no. 84 (Québec : Co. d'impr. de Québec, 1880-1896 ed.). Quebec (QC), Canada. October 22, 1886. p. 3.
- "Sir George Stephens' House at Metis". Morning chronicle and commercial and shipping gazette (Newspaper). Vol. 40, no. 14524 (Charles St. Michel,1850-1888 ed.). Montreal (QC), Canada. October 25, 1886. p. 2.
- "Sir George's Summer House". The Daily Witness (Newspaper). Vol. 27, no. 250 (John Dougall ed.). Montreal (QC), Canada. October 25, 1886. p. 6.
- "Sir George's New House. (Metis)". The Montreal daily star (Newspaper). Vol. 18, no. 252 (Graham & Co., proprietors, 1881-1951 ed.). Montreal (QC), Canada. October 25, 1886. p. 1.
