= Perazzi (surname) =

Perazzi is a surname. Notable people with the surname include:

- Antonio Perazzi (born 1969), Italian garden designer, landscape architect, botanist, writer and journalist
- Jean-Charles Perazzi (1936–2021), French writer and journalist

== See also ==
- Perazzi
- Pierazzi
