= Robert Reford =

Robert Reford may refer to:

- Robert Wilson Reford (1867–1951), Canadian photographer, businessman and art collector
- Robert Wilson Reford Sr. (1831–1913), businessman and philanthropist
