= Antonio Perazzi =

Italian garden designer, landscape architect, and journalist

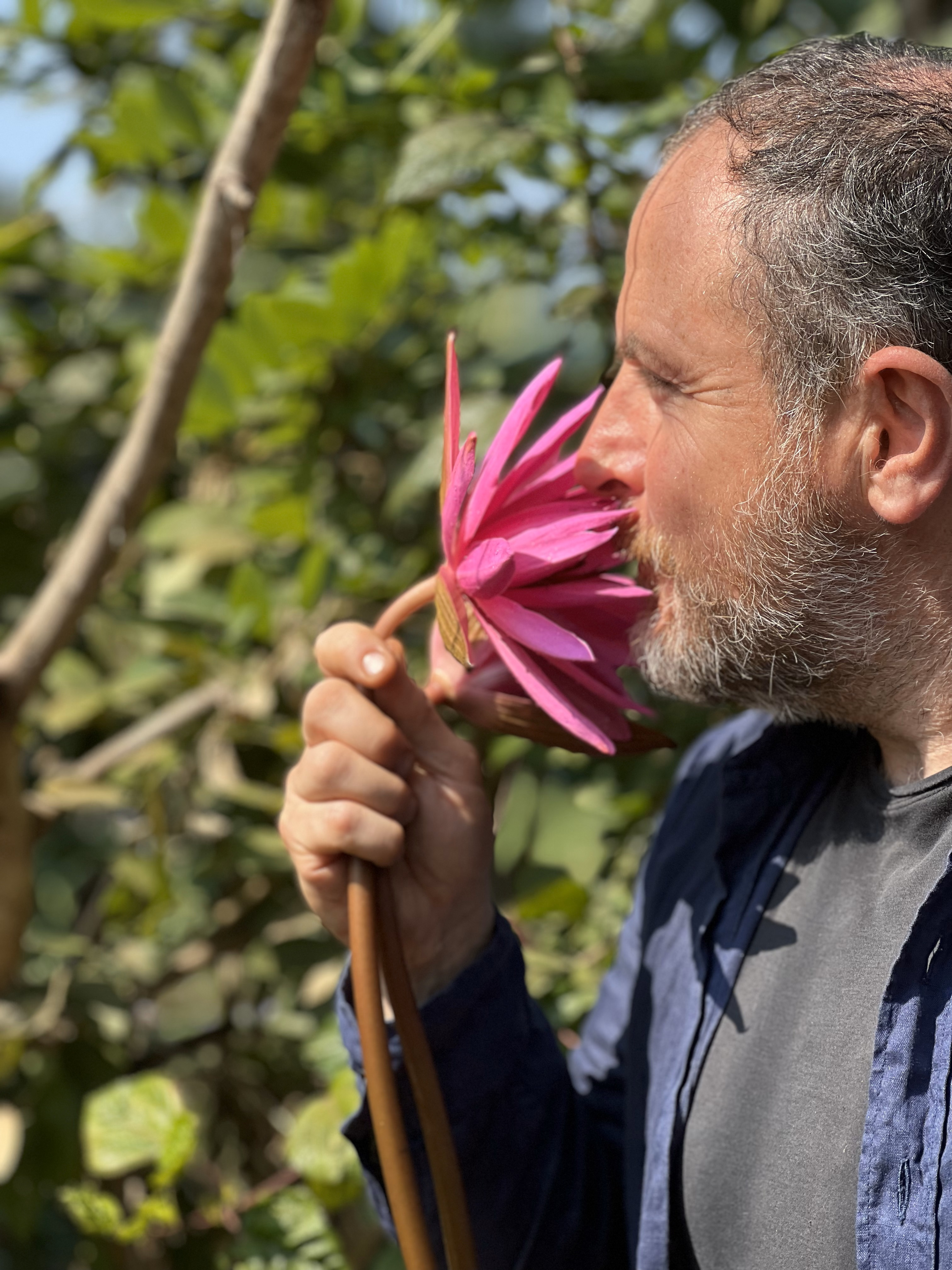

Antonio Perazzi (born 26 January 1969) is an Italian garden designer, landscape architect, botanist, writer and journalist. He is an expert in naturalistic and ecological garden.

== Biography ==
Antonio Perazzi specialized in garden and landscape architecture at Politecnico di Milano and at Royal Botanic Gardens, Kew in London. In 1998 he opened his studio and he signed projects as well as having offered advice to architectural and engineering companies, collaborating with Michele de Lucchi, Ettore Sottsass, Antonio Citterio, Franco Zagari, Park Associati, OBR, Tekne S.p.A., Cecchi & Lima Architetti Associati.

He was involved in public and private projects in Italy and abroad, among all: the two public parks of Via Brisa e Via Ovada in Milan, Triennale di Milano roof garden, Amagioia garden at Palazzo Varignana, part of the circuit Grandi Giardini Italiani, public spaces of Kaylan Mart mall, in Jaipur, India, landscape advice for Turin–Lyon high-speed railway. He has been invited to international exhibitions: Venice Biennale of Architecture, Festival international des jardins de Chaumont-sur-Loire, Avant gardeners exhibition at Tate Gallery, London, Féstival International des Jardins de Métis, at Redford garden, Grand-Métis, Quebec, Canada.

He was adjunct professor at Politecnico di Milano and held lectures and workshops in Italian and foreign faculties such as: Brera Academy, Politecnico di Milano, Universität der Künste Berlin, Istituto Superiore per le Industrie Artistiche (ISIA) of Urbino, Universität für angewandte Kunst Wien, Yunnan University of Finance & Economics, École nationale supérieure du paysage de Versailles.

Perazzi collaborates with national and international magazines. He published "Contro il Giardino" with Pia Pera for Ponte alle Grazie and "Foraverde" for Maestri di Giardino, with a preface of Gilles Clément; He monthly signs "Bustine di paesaggio" a column on the magazine Gardenia.

== Main projects ==
- 2015-2015 Triennale di Milano roof garden, Milan, Italy.
- 2015-2014 Public spaces of Kaylan Mart mall (under construction), Jaipur, India.
- 2015-2011 Public park of Via Brisa (in costruzione), Milan, Italy.
- 2013-2012 landscape advice for Turin–Lyon high-speed railway.
- 2012-2007 Park of Villa Amagioia, Palazzo Varignana, Grandi Giardini Italiani, Varignana, Bologna, Italy.
- 2005 Public park of via Ovada, wimmer of the international competition Living Milano 1, Milan, Italia.

== Main international exhibitions ==
- 2006 Fuorisalone of Milan, Terra.
- 2005–06 Orticola, Milan, Flowerpower.
- 2004-2003 Féstival International des Jardins de Métis, Redford garden, Grand-Métis, Quebec, Canada, Blue de Bois.
- 2004-2003 Festival international des jardins de Chaumont-sur-Loire, Spinaspacca.
- 2001 First edition of Martini Prize for garden Design, Villa Oliva-Buonvisi, San Pancrazio, Lucca, Il giardino del giardiniere.

== Prizes and honors ==
In 2009 he was selected as one of the world's most talented designers of public and private spaces in the book "Avant Gardeners: 50 Visionaries of the Contemporary Landscape". In 2001, he was selected for the first Martini Prize for Landscape architecture, Villa Oliva-Buonvisi, San Pancrazio, Lucca, with the project "Il giardino del giardiniere".

== Writings ==
Antonio Perazzi collaborates with national and international magazines. He published Contro il Giardino with Pia Pera for Ponte alle Grazie and "Foraverde" for Maestri di Giardino, with a preface by Gilles Clément; He monthly signs "Bustine di paesaggio" a column on the magazine Gardenia, Cairo Communication.

== Bibliography ==
- Pia Pera – Antonio Perazzi, Contro il Giardino, Ed. Ponte alle Grazie, 2007. ISBN 978-8879289009
- Antonio Perazzi, Foraverde, Ed. Maestri di Giardino, 2013. ISBN 9788898150199
