= Robert Wilson Reford =

Canadian photographer

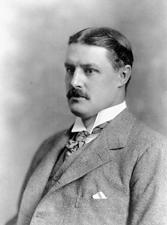
Robert Wilson Reford

Robert Wilson Reford (1867–1951) was a Canadian photographer, businessman and art collector.

== Birth and education ==
Reford was born in the Golden Square Mile, Montreal, the eldest son of Robert Wilson Reford and Katherine Sheriff Drummond, daughter of Andrew Drummond of Tredinnock, near Stirling in Scotland. He was educated at Upper Canada College in Toronto and Lincoln College, Sorel, Quebec.

== Career ==
His father was the founder of the Robert Reford Company, a shipping agency established in Montreal in 1866. In 1888, he began his apprenticeship in business, working as a Purser on board a Thomson Line vessel in the Mediterranean. The following year he was sent to Victoria, British Columbia to act as the assistant manager of the Mount Royal Rice Mills, a company his father had founded in 1882 and which had rice mills in Montreal and Victoria. There he was placed in charge of the Thermopylae, the former clipper ship which Robert Reford had acquired in 1890 to carry rice from the Far East to Victoria. He then worked in shipping offices in Antwerp and Paris. On his return to Montreal, he joined the staff of the Robert Reford Company.

Made a partner in 1906, Robert Reford succeeded to the presidency of the Robert Reford Company on the death of his father in 1913. The Robert Reford Company were the agents for the Cunard-White Star Line from 1911. Tickets for the Cunard Liners departing from Montreal were sold from the Reford agency buildings in Montreal, Toronto, Quebec City and Saint John, New Brunswick. Robert Reford was also active in the business and political life of the city. He was President of the Montreal Board of Trade in 1912. During the war he was the vice-president of the Montreal Branch of the Canadian Patriotic Fund. He served as President of the Canadian Club from 1915-16. In 1919, he was made a director of the Cunard Steamship Company.

== Private life ==
Robert Reford enjoyed photography and painting. Acquiring one of the first Kodak cameras in 1888, he became one of Canada's most prolific amateur photographers. During his sojourn in British Columbia, he photographed various first nation communities along the coast of British Columbia including the Kitlope at Wakasu in Gardner Canal, the Chinese community in Victoria and the Mount Royal Rice Mills. His photograph albums were donated by the Reford family to the National Archives of Canada and are considered to be among the treasures of the Archive's collection.

== Family ==
On June 12, 1894, Robert Reford married (Mary) Elsie Stephen Meighen, daughter of Robert Meighen and Elsie Stephen, niece of George Stephen, 1st Baron Mount Stephen. They had two sons, Bruce (1895-1972) and Eric (1900-1983). In 1902, they built their Montreal home at 300 Drummond Street in the Golden Square Mile, designed by architect Robert Findlay.

== Sources ==
- Dictionary of Canadian Biography Online
- Canadian Men & Women of the Time 1912, Ed. Henry James Morgan, Toronto, William Briggs, Richmond St. W., 1912.
- Jardins de Métis, Les guides des jardins du Québec, Éditions Fides, texte d'Alexander Reford, traduction d'Albert Beaudry.
- Private Realms of Light. Amateur photography in Canada 1839-1940, edited Lilly Koltun, Fitzhenry & Whiteside, 1984, p. 324.
- The Canadian Who's Who 1949-1951, Ed. Arthur L. Tunnell, Trans Canada Press, 1951
- Treasures of the National Archives of Canada, University of Toronto Press, 1992, p. 34 and p. 330-331.
- Jardins de Métis (Reford Gardens), jardinsdemetis.com
