= Alexander Reford =

Canadian horticulturalist

Alexander Reford CM is a historian by training, with master's degrees in history from the University of Toronto and Oxford University. Born in Ottawa, Ontario, in 1962, he was raised and educated in the Outaouais region of Québec. He held the position of Dean of College at St. Michael's College at the University of Toronto from 1987 to 1995. He left to assume the directorship of the Jardins de Métis (Reford Gardens), a cultural destination and tourist attraction located on the banks of the St. Lawrence in Grand-Métis, Quebec. The great-grandson of Elsie Reford, creator of the Gardens, he was instrumental in creating Les Amis des Jardins de Métis, a not-for-profit organization that purchased them from the Quebec government in 1995. Under his stewardship, a complete restoration of the gardens and the historic buildings on the property has been undertaken.

== Professional associations ==
He is the co-founder and director of the International Garden Festival, an annual event held since 2000 that has been acclaimed by critics and garden writers as one of the premier garden design events in the world. The Gardens have also become a leader in nature conservation, undertaking the preservation of tracts of land along the St. Lawrence River and creating an ecological park on the banks of the Mitis River that opened in the summer of 2002.

Alexander Reford is a member of the board of directors of the Canadian Tourism Commission where he serves as the representative of the small and medium-sized enterprises from Quebec. He is also president of the Association touristique régionale de la Gaspésie. He is involved in various organizations involved in gardens, tourism, historic preservation and culture and is an active volunteer in Quebec's Lower St. Lawrence/Gaspésie region where he lives.

== Publications ==
He has written numerous books and articles. He is a frequent contributor to the Dictionary of Canadian Biography and is the author of the biographies of Lord Mount Stephen and Lord Strathcona and his great great grandfathers, Robert Meighen and Robert Reford.

His first book, Des jardins oubliés 1860-1960, an album of photographs of Quebec's historic gardens, was published in 1999. He wrote a guidebook to the Reford Gardens in 2001. Au rythme du train 1859-1970, an album of photographs illustrating the history of trains in Quebec, was published in 2002. He has two other books on the history of the gardens, notably Elsie's Paradise – Reford Gardens and its sequel on the garden's plant collections, Treasures of Reford Gardens - Elsie Reford's Floral Legacy. He wrote The Metis Lighthouse with Paul Gendron and is leading efforts to preserve this local landmark. He is writing a book on the gardens of Québec and a history of tourism in the province.

== Politics ==
Reford was nominated as the Liberal Party of Canada candidate for the riding of Rimouski—La Matapédia in the 2025 Canadian federal election.

=== Electoral record ===
2025 Canadian federal election: Rimouski—La Matapédia
Party	Candidate	Votes	%	±%	Expenditures
Bloc Québécois	Maxime Blanchette-Joncas	24,608	46.28	–8.02	$49,301.33
Liberal	Alexander Reford	18,846	35.44	+13.36	$0.00
Conservative	Nancy Joannette	7,201	13.54	+2.34	$3,366.52
New Democratic	Salomé Salvain	946	1.78	–4.08	$0.00
Independent	Noémi Bureau-Civil	608	1.14	–1.87	$206.91
People's	Taraneh Javanbakht	337	0.63	–1.43	$0.00
Rhinoceros	Lysane Picker-Paquin	295	0.55	N/A	$0.00
Independent	Raphaël Arsenault	239	0.45	N/A	$39.77
Independent	Tommy Lefebvre	95	0.18	N/A	$47.62
Total valid votes/expense limit		–	–	–	$136,608.81
Total rejected ballots		–			
Turnout		53,175	63.20		
Eligible voters		84,140			
Bloc Québécois notional hold		Swing		–10.69	
Source: Elections Canada

== Awards ==
He was one of the "Top Forty Under Forty" in 2000. He has also been given various honours for his contribution to landscape architecture and gardens. He was made an honorary member of the Canadian Society of Landscape Architects. In 2009, he was awarded the Frederick-Todd Prize by the Association des Architectes Paysagistes du Québec. In the same year, the Montréal Botanical Garden bestowed the Henry-Teuscher Prize on Alexander Reford and Elsie Reford (posthumous) for their contribution to horticulture in Québec. In 2021 he was appointed to the Order of Canada.

== Sources ==
- Reford Gardens
- Canada's Top 40 Under 40 : 2000 Recipients
- FICHE PROJET : CALENDRIER GÉNÉRAL DES CONCOURS
- Jardin botanique
- Interview: Alexander Reford
