= George Stephen, 1st Baron Mount Stephen =

Canadian businessman

The Right Honourable The Lord Mount Stephen Bt GCVO
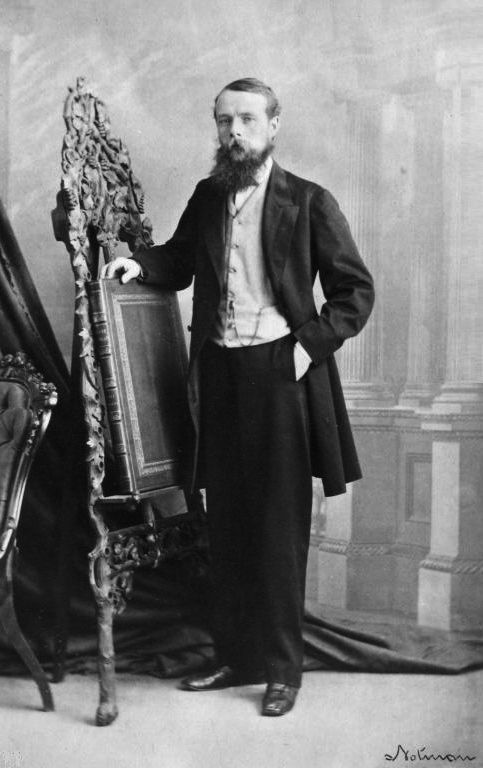
- Stephen in 1865

9th President of the Bank of Montreal
- In office 1876–1881
- Preceded by: David Torrance
- Succeeded by: Charles Francis Smithers

Personal details
- Born: George Stephen; 5 June 1829 Dufftown, Scotland
- Died: 29 November 1921 (aged 92) Brocket Hall, Hatfield, England
- Spouse(s): Annie Charlotte Kane (m. 1853–1896; her death); Georgina Mary "Gian" Tufnell (m. 1897–1921; his death)
- Children: 1 daughter (adopted)
- Relatives: Lord Strathcona (cousin); Elsie Reford (niece)

George Stephen, 1st Baron Mount Stephen, Bt GCVO (5 June 1829 – 29 November 1921), known as Sir George Stephen, Bt, between 1886 and 1891, was a Canadian peer and businessman. Originally from Scotland, he made his fame in Montreal and was the first Canadian to be elevated to the Peerage of the United Kingdom. He was the financial genius behind the creation of the Canadian Pacific Railway.

He was President of the Bank of Montreal and is remembered as one of the greatest philanthropists of his time: he built a new wing at the Montreal General Hospital, donated generously to various hospitals in Scotland and gave over £1.3 million to the Prince of Wales Hospital Fund in London, working closely with George V. He and his first cousin, Lord Strathcona, purchased the land and then each gave $1 million to the City of Montreal to construct and maintain the Royal Victoria Hospital. His home in Montreal's Golden Square Mile later became the Mount Stephen Club.

In 1888, he retired to England, living between Brocket Hall and 17 Carlton House Terrace. His first wife is credited with introducing the canoe to Scotland. From starting life as a bare-footed stable boy, he became the richest man in Canada and closely associated with George V, whose wife, Queen Mary, was a lifelong friend and confidante of the second Lady Mount Stephen.

== Early years ==
Stephen was born in 1829 at Dufftown, Banffshire, in a cottage built by his grandfather. He was the son of William Stephen (b. 1801), a carpenter, and Elspet, daughter of John Smith, a crofter at Knockando, Moray. His mother was a first cousin of the philanthropic Grant brothers of Manchester, immortalised as the "Cheeryble Brothers" in Charles Dickens' Nicholas Nickleby.

Stephen began life as a boy running barefoot through fields to carry letters for the Duke of Richmond for a shilling. He was educated at the parish school, leaving at the age of fourteen to work variously as a stable boy, shepherd and in a local hotel. The following year he was apprenticed to a draper and silk mercer at Aberdeen, before moving to London in 1848 - first working for a draper and then at a wholesale dry goods house.

George Stephen's first cousin, William Stephen, had already emigrated to Montreal and established a wholesale dry goods business on St. Paul Street. At William's invitation, the Stephen family came to Montreal in 1847, and George joined them in 1850. For the next twelve years George worked for his cousin, who left him the business after his death in 1862. George made his brother, Francis, a partner and eventually sold the business to him and Andrew Robertson in 1867. By 1864, he had been elected to the Montreal Board of Trade, a clear sign of his early success, and by 1866 he was running his own successful wool-importing company while also investing in other textile businesses. Driven by a desire to succeed, coupled with a strong work ethic, he was already demonstrating an unusual business acumen.

In 1866, he started to work closely with his first cousin, Donald Smith (later Lord Strathcona). The two were to become partners in a myriad of ventures which made them both a fortune. One of their first investments was in 1868, when they formed a partnership with Richard B. Angus and Andrew Paton to establish the Paton (Textile) Manufacturing Company of Sherbrooke. By the late 1860s, Stephen had become one of the foremost financiers in Montreal, forming boards and working alongside Montreal's most prominent business names. By 1873, he had become a director of the Bank of Montreal, and three years later he was elected president, in which capacity he frequently traveled to London and New York City to meet with the leading financiers there. He remained as president until 1881, resigning to turn his full attention to running the company that would build the Canadian Pacific Railway. He was elected to the Montreal Board of Trade in July 1864 as a successful businessman. Stephen had begun investing in railways and formed the Canada Rolling Stock Company in 1870.

== Railroads ==
In 1877, his cousin Donald Smith introduced him to James Hill, which led to the establishment of George Stephen & Associates, one of the most profitable partnerships in the history of North American railways. The associates were Hill, Smith, Hill's business partner Norman Kittson, and John Stewart Kennedy, an investment banker from Scotland active in New York. They were later joined by two more Montrealers, R.B. Angus and Duncan McIntyre. Hill was to commission the Swiss-born American portrait painter Adolfo Muller-Ury to paint his portrait in London in 1898 – along with that of his cousin Strathcona – and until 2008 Mount Stephen's portrait hung in the railroad offices of the Burlington Northern Santa Fe Railroad in New Mexico, U.S.A.; it is now in a private collection at Estevan Lodge in Jardins de Métis, Canada.

In 1879, the syndicate purchased the struggling Saint Paul and Pacific Railroad for $5.5 million. The deal created a sensation in Montreal as it was rumoured that Stephen had used his position as President of the Bank of Montreal to obtain loans at limited rates. Stephen treated the "scribblers" of the press with contempt, but they continued to plague him and the complicated financial structures he put together. Stephen was constantly concerned about their effect on his businesses and reputation. The syndicate, however, turned the St. Paul railroad around. They changed its name, restored profitability and expanded its lines to Winnipeg. In 1885, they sold the railroad for $25 million, and such was the success of the partnership (minus Kittson who retired from business in 1881) that it had already led them to win the contract with the Government of Canada to build the CPR. Stephen became the first president of Canadian Pacific Railway and held the position till 1888.

== Building the Canadian Pacific Railway ==
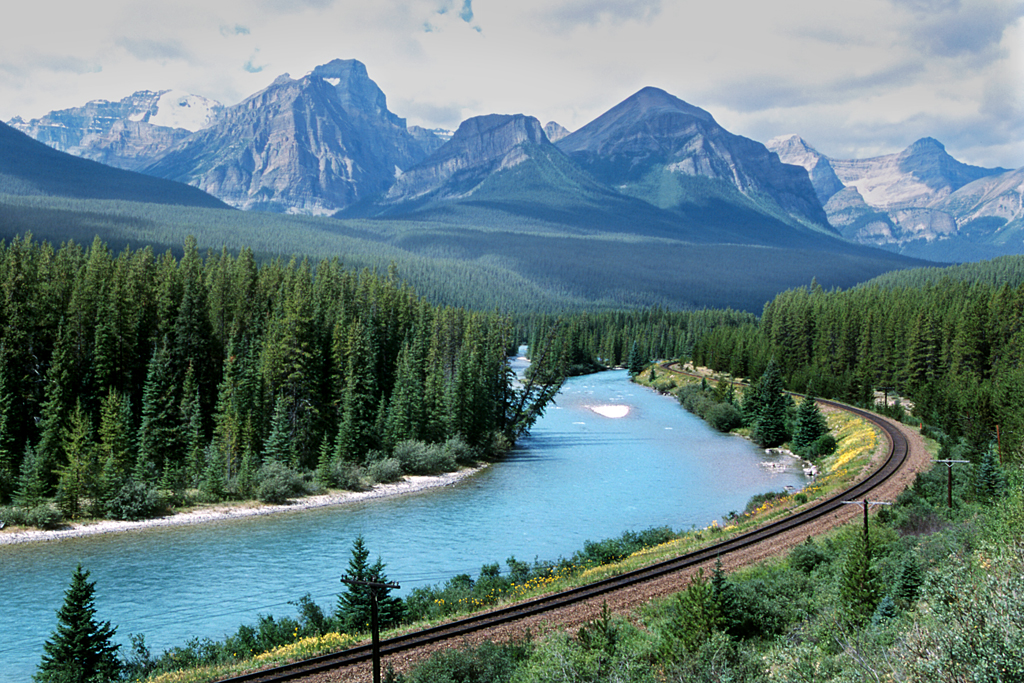
The CPR track at Morant's Curve, cutting through Banff National Park

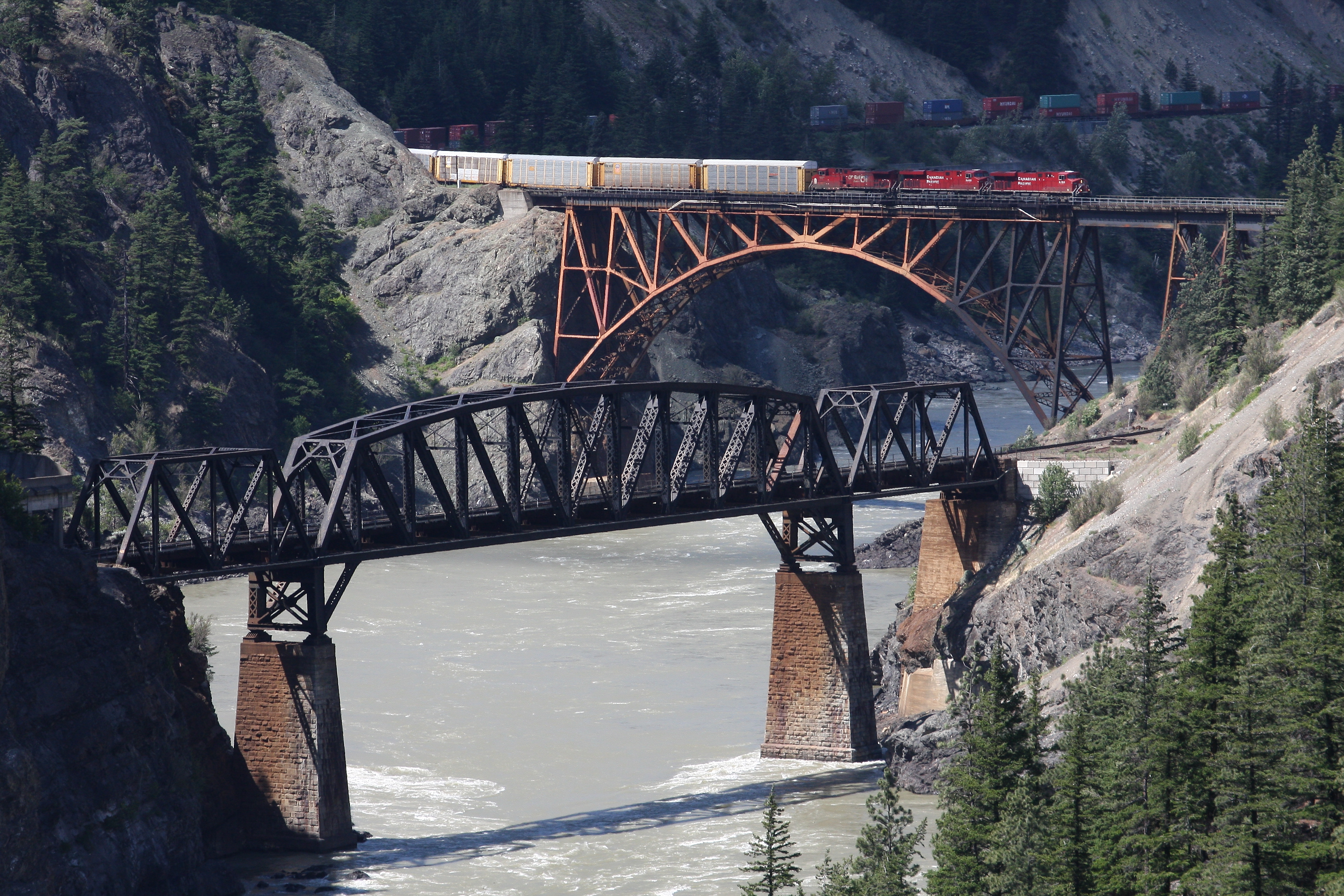
The CPR track crossing the Fraser River

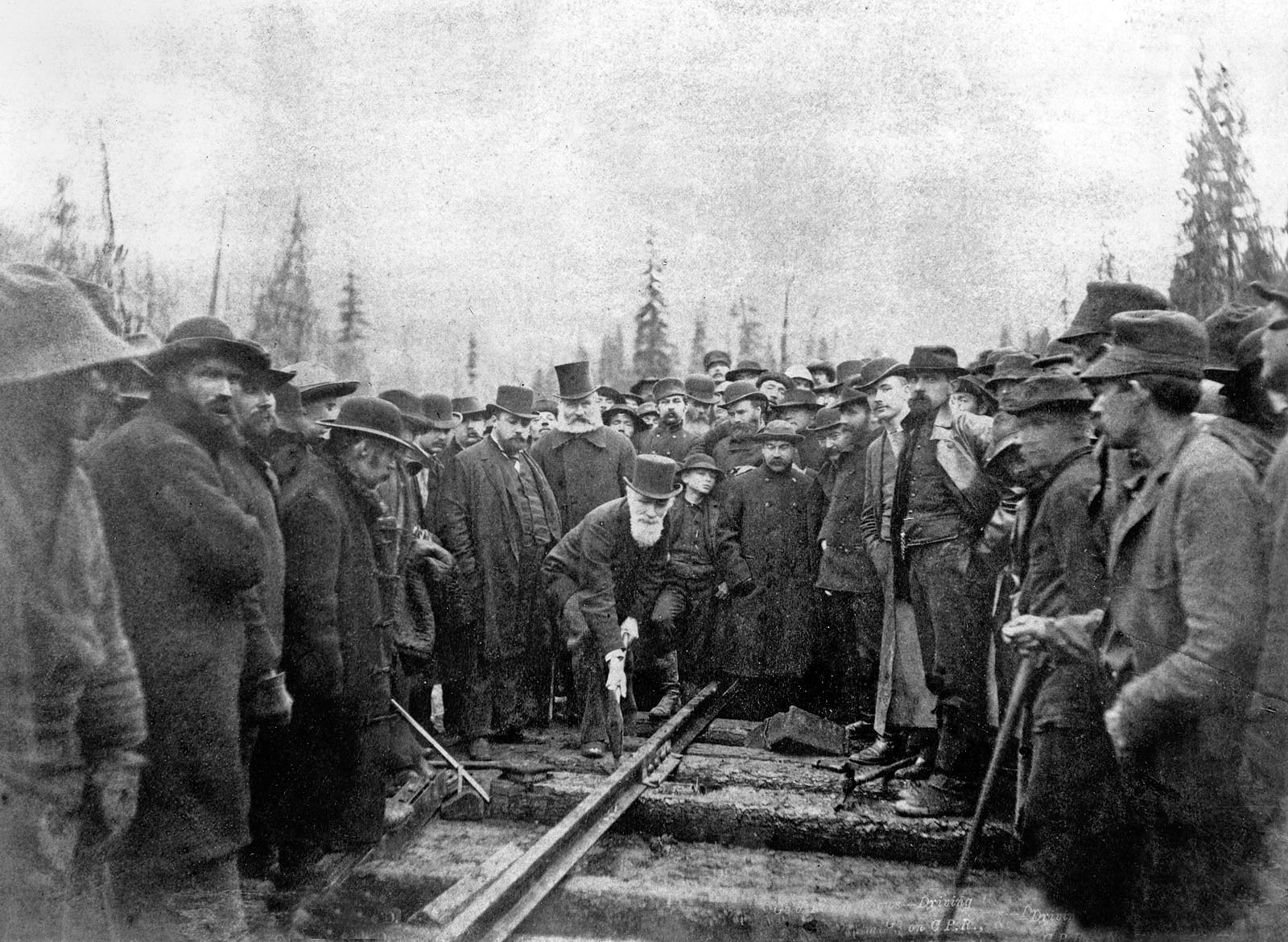
The Last Spike of the CPR, 1885

Named as the CPR's first president, Stephen oversaw the monumental task of not just negotiating a route across 2,000 miles of forests, swamps, rivers, and mountains; but also raising the necessary funds estimated at $100 million, of which at least half had to be secured. At Hill's suggestion he hired William Cornelius Van Horne to construct three major sections of the track, and his partnership with James Ross proved invaluable to the engineering success of the railway. However, by the end of 1881, Stephen admitted that the project was "assuming dimensions far beyond my calculations". He ceased all other activities, and bringing R.B. Angus to Montreal with him, they devoted all their energies to the world's second transcontinental railroad.

As Stephen purposefully did not want a long list of investors, the risks were high to all those involved and the CPR found few takers in London and New York City. By 1883, the syndicate was straining under the huge financial obligations being called of them. Stephen was risking almost all of his fortune on the venture and even used his mansion in Montreal as collateral. Hill resigned in 1883, when he realised that his own railroad would be in direct competition with the CPR for eastbound traffic. However, through loyalty to his partners, he held on to half of his shares. Next, Kennedy resigned, depressing the CPR stock even further and making Stephen's increasingly frantic attempts to find capital even more difficult. In the face of this crisis, fellow Montrealer McIntyre resigned in 1884, forcing the other directors to buy his shares and in the process earning himself Stephen's lifelong enmity.

Using every ounce of his experience in banking, natural flair for persuasion and business acumen, Stephen proved capable of putting together the complicated financing needed to complete the project, despite cost overruns from numerous unanticipated engineering, business and political problems. The final piece in the financial puzzle was secured when, in 1885, he travelled to London for a personal appeal that convinced Lord Revelstoke and Barings Bank to underwrite the sale of £3 million in company stock.

On 7 November 1885, at Craigellachie, British Columbia, Donald Smith famously hammered home the last spike in the railroad.

Stephen, Smith, and Angus were the sole members of the original syndicate to have kept their nerve. Their gamble paid off and the success of the first leg of what would soon become the "world's greatest transportation system" almost immediately made them enormously rich.

== Aftermath ==
Stephen gave over $1 million to Sir John A. Macdonald's government from 1882 to 1890, knowing full well the important part it played in the successful completion of the CPR when their finances had been nothing short of precarious. But, Stephen refused to accept the argument that the CPR owed its existence to the government. He became engaged in a very public battle over several years with John Norquay concerning the unpopular monopoly clause, but had to concede to public pressure in 1888, allowing the construction of branch lines south of the CPR main line. Though a financier of undoubted reputation, Stephen did not excel in public debate. He resigned as President of the CPR in 1888 and approved the appointment of William Cornelius Van Horne to succeed him.

Though of course a very wealthy man, the CPR had taken a significant toll on Stephen's personal portfolio. James Hill had ended up better off than him for having held on to his railroad when Stephen had had to liquidate his share in it to ensure the completion of the CPR. He also regretted having encouraged his associates to invest in the CPR, knowing that Hill's Manitoba Railway was a better opportunity. He was not bitter towards Hill, in fact quite the opposite, remaining as Hill's staunchest ally throughout the remainder of his career. Stephen remained a director of the CPR until 1893, but thereafter showed only glimpses of interest in the railway. He reduced his holdings and even encouraged others to follow suit. Ironically, the principal source of Stephen's vast wealth stemmed from his investments in Hill's railroads.

== Salmon fishing ==
A tireless worker, in private life Stephen was retiring with only one real passion – salmon fishing – an enthusiasm in which his first wife readily joined him. In 1873, he purchased an estate at the confluence of the Matapédia and Cascapédia rivers. He made regular trips to the lodge (today a museum) and entertained friends and the occasional Governor-General there.

Stephen was a pioneer of sport fishing in the Gaspé Peninsula, introducing many to not only the sport but also to the region, of which he was a generous benefactor. In 1886, he purchased another estate at Grand-Métis, building Estevan Lodge. In 1918, he gave this estate to his sister's daughter, Elsie (Meighen) Reford, who transformed it into the vast Jardins de Métis (Reford Gardens) ornamental garden that remains famous today.

== Philanthropy ==
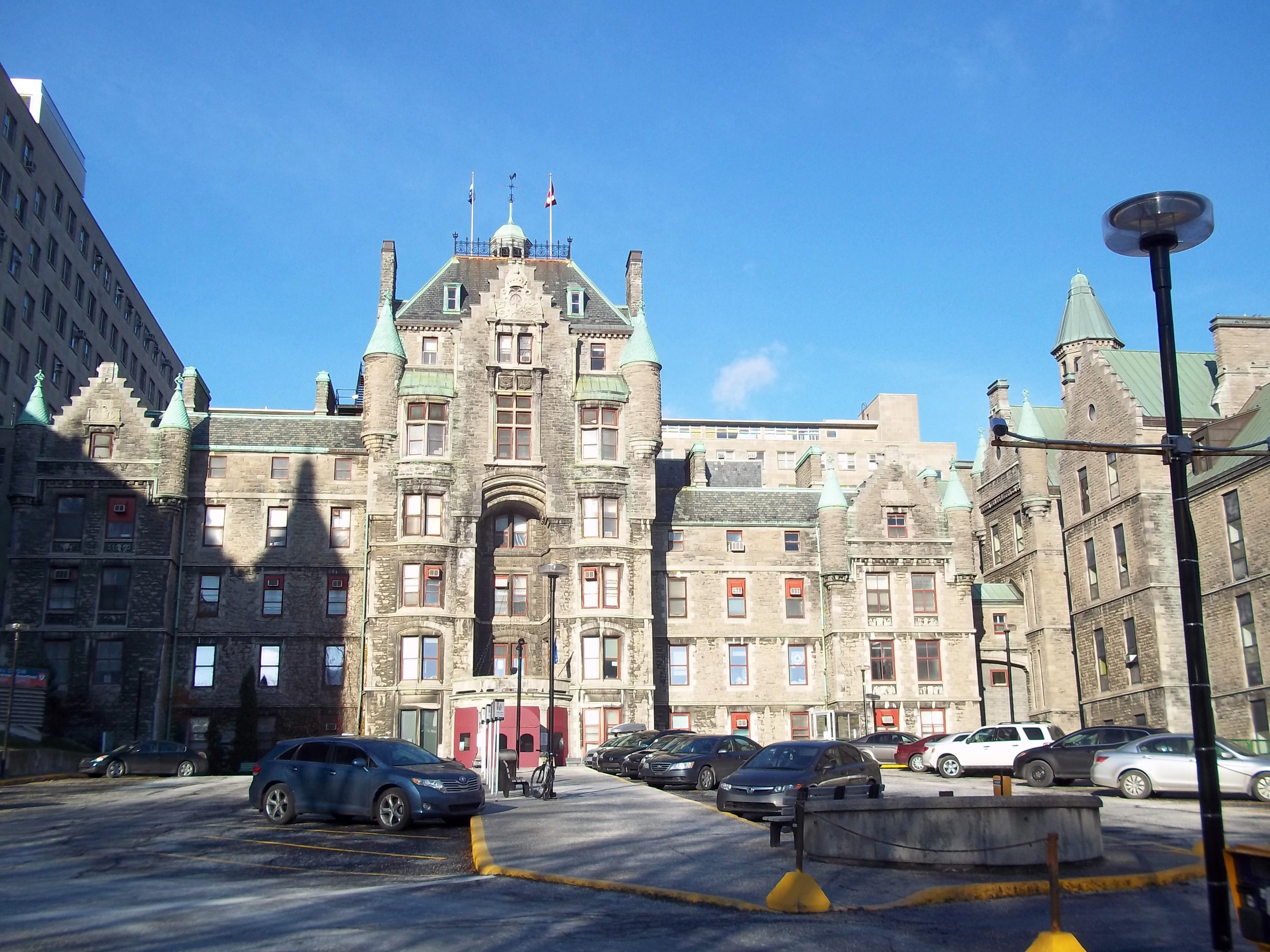
The Royal Victoria Hospital was given to the City of Montreal by George Stephen and his first cousin Lord Strathcona in 1890

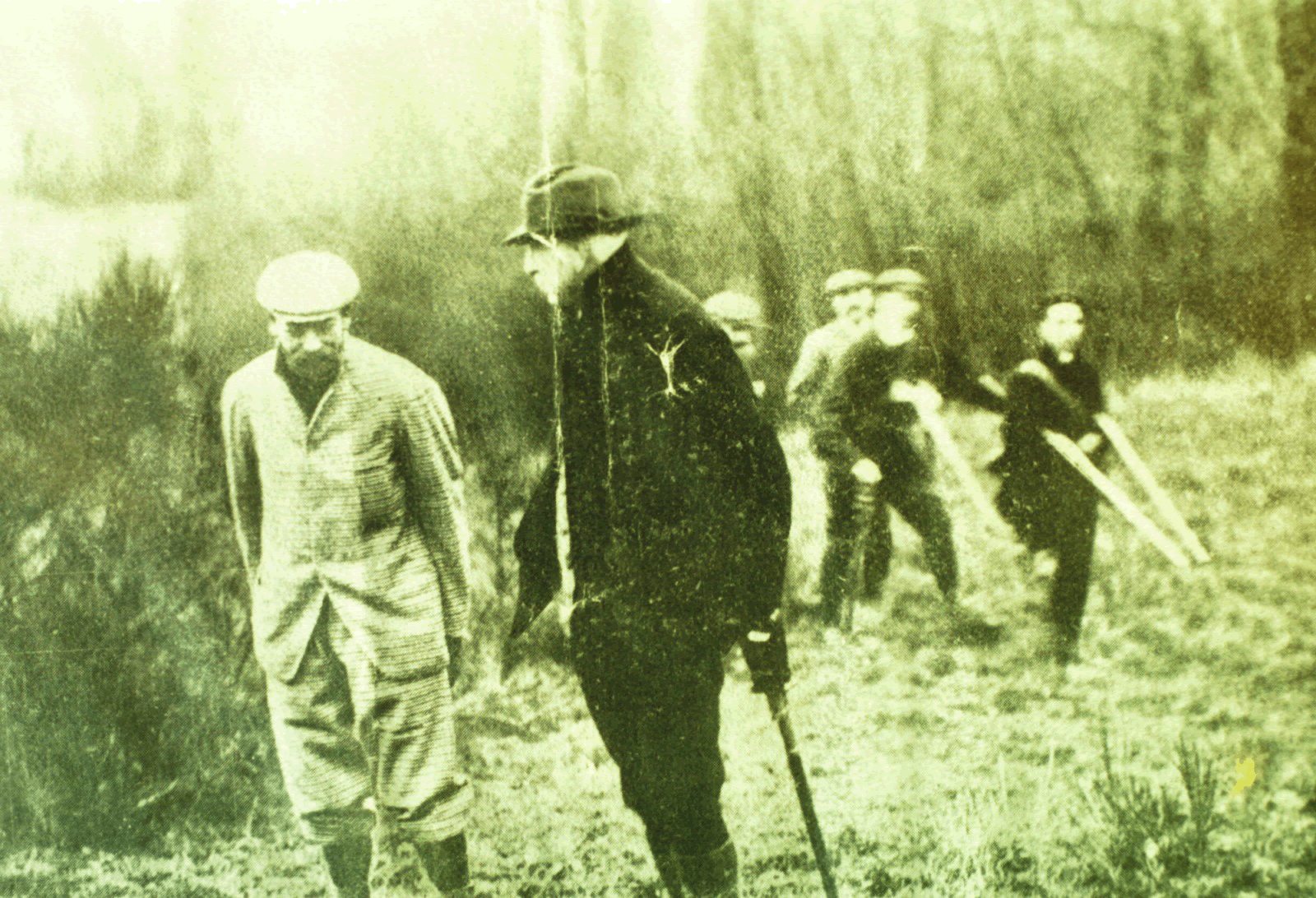
Lord Mount Stephen (left) with George V at a shooting weekend hosted at his home in England, Brocket Hall

Remembered as one of the most generous philanthropists of his time, Stephen sought no accolades for his gestures and directed the majority of his fortune towards hospitals. In 1890, he and his first cousin, Lord Strathcona, purchased the Frothingham estate in the Golden Square Mile as the site for the Royal Victoria Hospital. They gave this purchase to the City of Montreal with the caveat that the land and its buildings must only ever be used for education and healing. They then contributed $500,000 each for its construction and after it opened in 1893 they gave a further $500,000 each in stock to establish an endowment fund to maintain it. Stephen also donated a wing to the Montreal General Hospital and made donations to various hospitals in Scotland. In 1901 he donated £25,000 to clear the debt resting on the Aberdeen Royal Infirmary, for which he was in August 1901 honoured with the Freedom of the City of Aberdeen.

Though best remembered today for the Royal Vic, he reserved the bulk of his fortune for the Prince of Wales Hospital Fund in London. Stephen worked closely with the future George V in creating its endowment fund and was its most important benefactor, having made gifts to the amount of £1,315,000.

To put these figures into a personal perspective, when Mount Stephen died in 1921, after providing for his wife, step-daughter and charities, he left £1,414,319 to be divided between nineteen relatives, which worked out at about £75,000 each. Though hardly an inconsequential sum, he gave substantially more to charity than he left to his individual heirs. In his will, he left little to charities in Canada, believing that through the donations mentioned above and his legacy that was the Canadian Pacific Railway, he had given more to Canada than it had given to him.

== Montreal to England ==
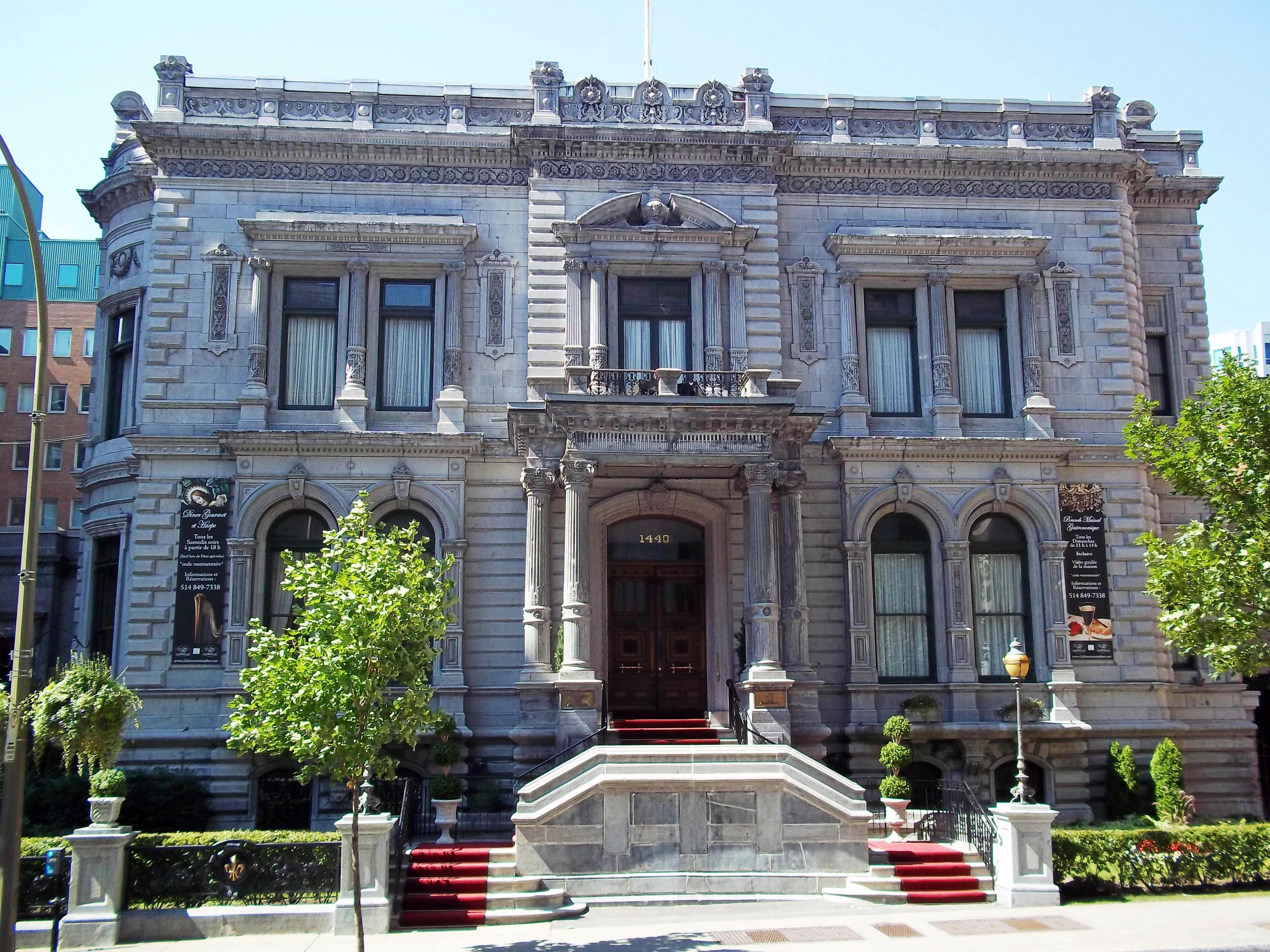
Stephen's Montreal mansion (now known as George Stephen House), which was completed in 1883

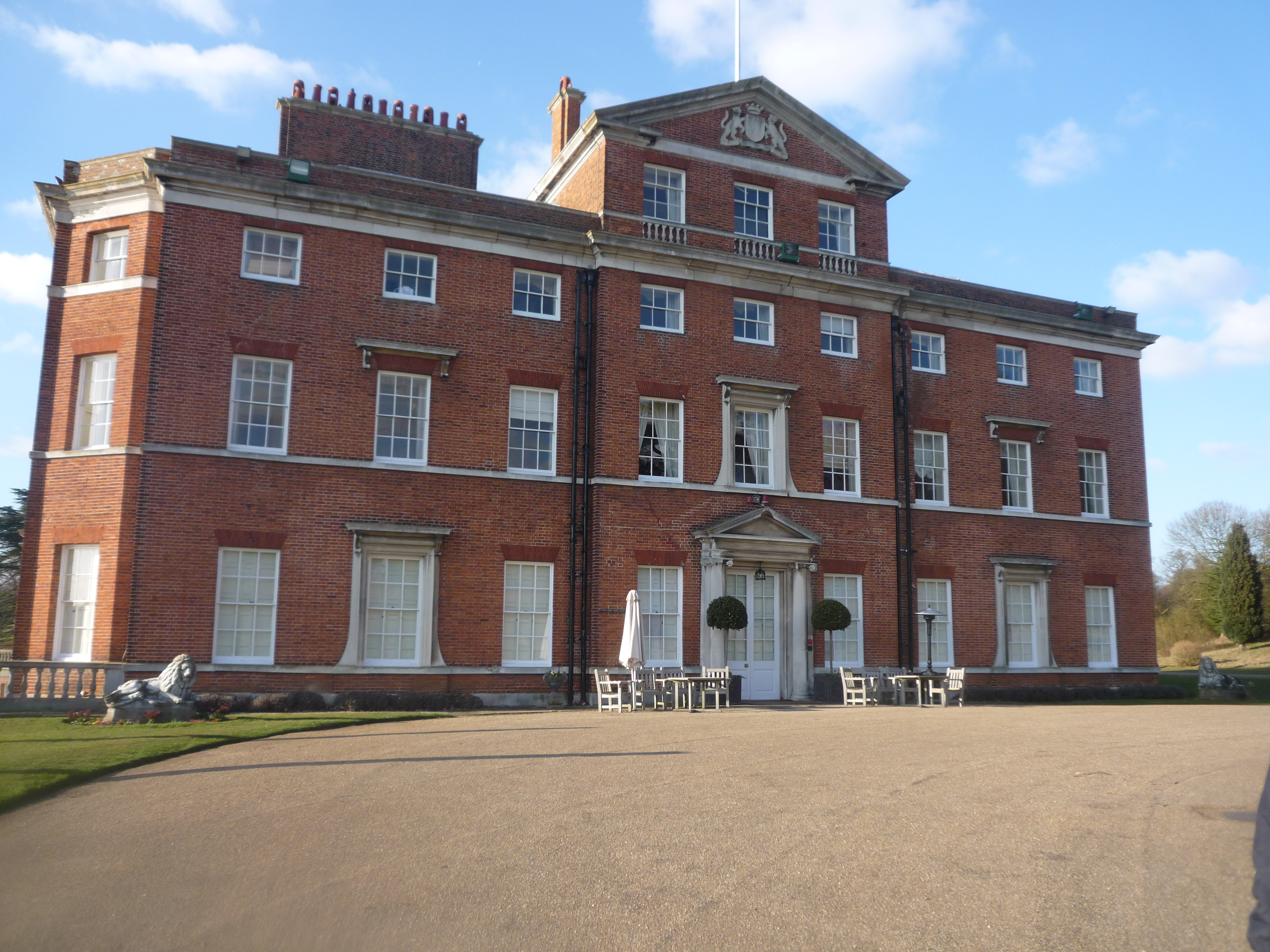
Brocket Hall near Hatfield in England, Stephen's country home from 1893 until his death in 1921

In 1880, Stephen employed the architect William Tutin Thomas to design a sumptuous mansion (now known as George Stephen House) for him in Montreal's Golden Square Mile. The house took three years to complete and cost some $600,000. Architectural historian Arthur Richardson described it as "one of the real masterpieces of the Italianate style in Canada". After Stephen moved to England, the house was occupied by his sister Elsie Stephen and her husband, Robert Meighen, who purchased the residence in 1900. It became the clubhouse of the Mount Stephen Club in 1926.

From the mid-1880s, Stephen began to spend an increasing amount of time in England. Tired of the business and politics that surrounded his life in Montreal, when he retired from the CPR in 1888, he settled permanently in England. The Stephens kept a London residence at 17 Carlton House Terrace and from 1893 leased Brocket Hall near Hatfield, Hertfordshire, where he died in 1921.

Stephen had been created a baronet in 1886, and in 1891, he had the honour of being the first Canadian to be elevated to the Peerage of the United Kingdom. He was created Baron Mount Stephen "of Mount Stephen in the Province of British Columbia and Dominion of Canada, and of Dufftown in the County of Banff" (Scotland). He took the name from the Mount Stephen peak in the Rocky Mountains, previously named in his honour and adjacent to the CPR line. Mount Stephen House, a CPR hotel at the base of the mountain, also bore his name.

Lord Mount Stephen sat regularly in the House of Lords but avoided public speaking and committees. He returned to Canada infrequently, making his last trip in 1894, but his influence there remained considerable, particularly to those seeking high office – Lord Minto acknowledged that he owed his appointment as Governor General of Canada in 1898 to the influence of Stephen and Lord Wolseley. From the 1890s onward, he passed management of his substantial investments in Canada, the United States and England to his individual agents in those countries.

Lord Mount Stephen was appointed a Knight Grand Cross of the Royal Victorian Order in 1905.

== Charlotte (1830–1896), the 1st Lady Mount Stephen ==
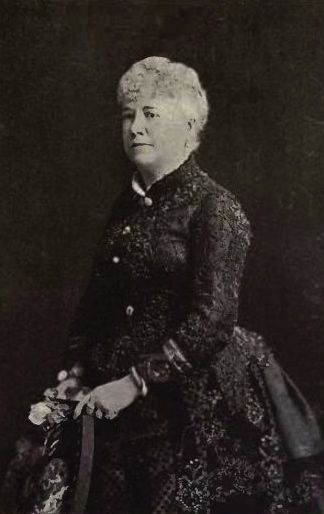
The first Lady Mount Stephen

At London, on 8 April 1853, George Stephen married his first wife, Annie Charlotte Kane (1830–1896). She was one of several children born to Benjamin Kane on the island of Corfu when the Ionian Islands were a British protectorate. Her father, a former officer in the Royal Engineers was assistant clerk of works in the Naval Ordnance there, though she was educated in London. During a Royal Tour, the haemophiliac Prince Leopold, Duke of Albany, fell seriously ill at Montreal and Charlotte nursed him back to health. As such, in 1887, she was first presented to Queen Victoria by her friend Georgina Gascoyne-Cecil, Marchioness of Salisbury, who lived at Hatfield House which neighboured the Stephen's home from 1893, Brocket Hall. The Queen thanked Lady Mount Stephen by presenting her with an oil portrait of herself.

At Brocket Hall, Lady Mount Stephen frequently entertained the Prince (the future Edward VII) and Princess of Wales, the Duke and Duchess of Connaught and the Duchess of Teck. She introduced the canoe to Scotland while living at Faskally, Perthshire and fished with her husband in Canada and the rivers of Scotland. She died in London on 10 April 1896, and was buried in Lemsford Churchyard, adjoining Brocket Hall. The couple had no biological children, but had adopted as a young woman in Montreal, Alice Brooke, purportedly the daughter of a Vermont clergyman.

- Alice Maude Stephen (died 1934), DBE (born Alice Brooke). Her adopted father introduced her to, and in 1873 she married, Henry Northcote, 1st Baron Northcote. The union was childless. In 1919, she was appointed Dame Commander of the Order of the British Empire.

== Georgiana (1864–1933), the 2nd Lady Mount Stephen ==
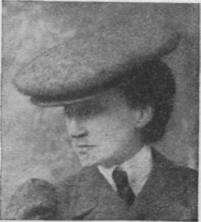
The second Lady Mount Stephen

In 1897, after the death of his first wife, Mount Stephen remarried Georgiana Mary (known as Gian) Tufnell (1864–1933), daughter of Captain Robert George Tufnell R.N., of Uffington and Jessy (née Curtis), granddaughter of Sir William Curtis, 1st Bt. Gian was a niece of George Glyn, 2nd Baron Wolverton and she had been Lady-in-Waiting to Princess Mary Adelaide, Duchess of Teck, a frequent guest at Brocket Hall, and the mother of Queen Mary. Through this connection, Gian was a lifelong friend and confidante of Queen Mary and she and Lord Mount Stephen regularly entertained her and her husband, George V, at Brocket. The Duchess of Teck was said to have been strongly in favour of Gian and Mount Stephen's marriage.

Gian Mount Stephen had a stillborn daughter in March 1900, and there were no other children of the marriage. She was said to have preferred the life at Brocket Hall to the social life that surrounded their city residence on Carlton House Terrace. She was also said to have been exceedingly popular around Hatfield, and her many benefactions endeared her to hundreds. Lady Mount Stephen was created a Dame Commander of the Order of the British Empire in 1919 for her work with Queen Mary's Needlework Guild, the same year her stepdaughter, Alice, was also awarded the same honour.

Gian, Lady Mount Stephen gave Queen Mary a diamond riviere necklace, which was later given to Princess Margaret, who wore it on her wedding day.

Lady Mount Stephen died in 1933 at Cuckfield, Sussex, England. As Lord Mount Stephen had left no natural heirs by either of his wives, his titles died with him.

== Coat of arms ==
Coat of arms of George Stephen, 1st Baron Mount Stephen
| Adopted 1891 Coronet Baron's coronet Crest A horse’s head erased Argent bridled proper holding in its mouth a sprig of three maple leaves Vert and charged on the neck with a fleur-de-lis Azure Escutcheon Or on a mount in base a maple tree proper in chief two fleurs-de-lis Azure Motto CONTRA AUDENTIOR (Latin for 'Ever more bold') Orders Royal Victorian Order |

== See also ==
- Canadian Hereditary Peers
- Golden Square Mile

Business positions
| Preceded by David Torrance | President of the Bank of Montreal; 1876–1881 | Succeeded by C. F. Smithers |
| New title | President of Canadian Pacific Railway Limited; 1881–1888 | Succeeded by William Cornelius Van Horne |
Peerage of the United Kingdom
| New creation | Baron Mount Stephen; 1891–1921 | Extinct |
Baronetage of the United Kingdom
| New creation | Baronet (of Montreal); 1886–1921 | Extinct |
| Preceded by Montefiore baronets | Stephen baronets of Montreal; 3 March 1886 | Succeeded by Brooks baronets |
