= Albert Gower-Rees =

Canadian Anglican priest

- Born: 1880; Carmarthenshire
- Died: 1956 (aged 75–76)
- Occupation: Anglican priest

Albert Philip Gower-Rees (1880–1956) was an Anglican priest who held senior leadership positions in Canada during the mid 20th Century.

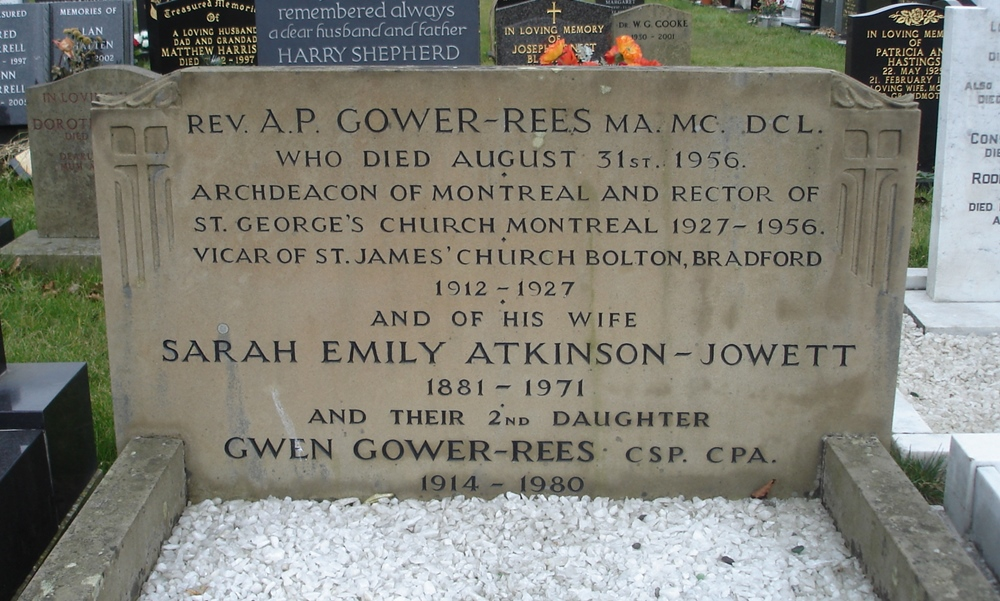
Memorial headstone for Albert Gower-Rees, Harrogate Stonefall Cemetery, North Yorkshire

Born in Carmarthenshire, Gower-Rees was educated at Christ's College, Cambridge. He was ordained deacon in 1905; and priest in 1906. He served curacies in Walkley and Doncaster. He was Vicar of St James, Bolton, Bradford from 1912 to 1915; then a Chaplain to the Forces from 1915 to 1919. He was awarded the Military Cross in 1917 and wounded by a shell splinter the same year.

After the war he returned to Bradford, staying until 1927, when he was appointed the Rector of St George, Montreal. He was Archdeacon of St Andrews, Quebec from 1933 to 1940 and Archdeacon of Montreal from 1940 until his death in 1956. During World War II he was chaplain to the Canadian Navy.

He died on holiday in Quebec shortly before he was due to retire. He had married Sarah Atkinson-Jowett in 1911; they had 3 daughters.
