= Elsie Reford =

Canadian gardener

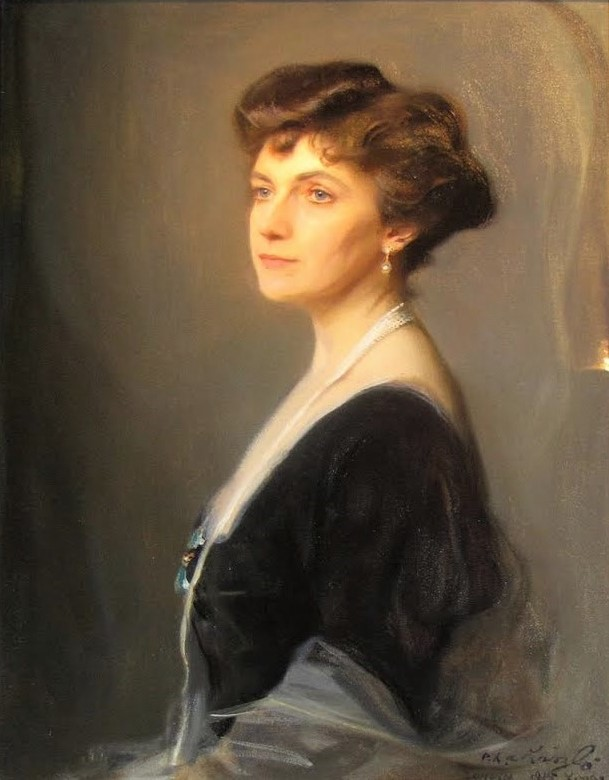
Elsie Reford

Elsie Reford (née Meighen; January 22, 1872 – November 8, 1967) was a pioneer of Canadian horticulture, creating one of the largest private gardens in Canada on her estate, Estevan Lodge, in eastern Quebec. Located in Grand-Métis on the south shore of the St. Lawrence River, her gardens have been open to the public since 1962 and operate under the name Les Jardins de Métis and Reford Gardens.

== Biography ==
Born January 22, 1872 at Perth, Ontario, Elsie Reford was the eldest of three children born to Robert Meighen and Elsie Stephen. Coming from modest backgrounds themselves, Reford's parents ensured that their children received a good education. After being educated in Montreal, she was sent to finishing school in Dresden and Paris, returning to Montreal fluent in both German and French, and ready to take her place in society.

She married Robert Wilson Reford on June 12, 1894. She gave birth to two sons, Bruce in 1895 and Eric in 1900. Robert and Elsie Reford were, by many accounts, an ideal couple. In 1902, they built a house on Drummond Street in Montreal. They both loved the outdoors and they spent several weeks a year in a log cabin they built at Lac Caribou, south of Rimouski. In the autumn they hunted for caribou, deer, and ducks, and returned in winter to ski and snowshoe. She also liked to ride: she had learned as a girl and spent many hours riding on the slopes of Mount Royal. She was also an excellent salmon fisher.

In her day, she was known for her civic, social, and political activism. She was engaged in philanthropic activities, particularly for the Montreal Maternity Hospital and she was also the moving force behind the creation of the Women's Canadian Club of Montreal, the first women's club in Canada. She believed it important that the women become involved in debates over the great issues of the day, "something beyond the local gossip of the hour". Her acquaintance with Lord Grey, the Governor-General of Canada from 1904 to 1911, led to her involvement in organizing, in 1908, Quebec City's tercentennial celebrations. The event was one of many to which she devoted herself in building bridges with the French-Canadian community.

During the First World War, she joined her two sons in England and did volunteer work at the War Office, translating documents from German into English. After the war, she was active in the Victorian Order of Nurses, the Montreal Council of Social Agencies, and the National Association of Conservative Women.

In 1925 at the age of 53 years, Reford was operated for appendicitis and during her convalescence, her doctor counselled against fishing, fearing that she did not have the strength to return to the river. "Why not take up gardening?" he said, thinking this a more suitable pastime for a convalescent woman of a certain age. She began laying out the gardens and supervising their construction. The gardens would take ten years to build, and would extend over more than twenty acres.

Reford had to overcome many difficulties in bringing her garden to life. First among them were the allergies that sometimes left her bedridden for days on end. The second obstacle was the property itself. Estevan was first and foremost a fishing lodge. The site was chosen because of its proximity to a salmon river and its dramatic views – not for the quality of the soil.

To counteract nature's deficiencies, she created soil for each of the plants she had selected, bringing peat and sand from nearby farms. This exchange was fortuitous to the local farmers, suffering through the Great Depression. Then, as now, the gardens provided much-needed work to an area with high unemployment. Reford's genius as a gardener was born of the knowledge she developed of the needs of plants.

Over the course of her long life, she became an expert plantsman. By the end of her life, Reford was able to counsel other gardeners, writing in the journals of the Royal Horticultural Society and the North American Lily Society. Reford was not a landscape architect and had no training of any kind as a garden designer. While she collected and appreciated art, she claimed no talents as an artist.

Reford died on November 8, 1967, at her home in Montreal.

In 1995, the Reford Gardens ("Jardins de Métis") in Grand-Métis were designated a National Historic Site of Canada, as being an excellent Canadian example of the English-inspired garden.

== Sources ==
- Jardins de Métis, Les guides des jardins du Québec, Éditions Fides, texte d'Alexander Reford, traduction d'Albert Beaudry.
- refordgardens.com
