= Pierazzi =

Pierazzi is a surname of Italian origin.

Notable people with the name include:

- Ferdinando Pierazzi (1898–1937), Italian politician
- Giuseppe Pierazzi (born 1940), birth name of Jože Pirjevec, Slovene-Italian historian
- Jean-Baptiste Pierazzi (born 1985), French footballer
- Torello Romolo Pierazzi (died 1851), Roman Catholic Bishop of San Miniato from 1834 to 1851

== See also ==
- Pierozzi
- Perazzi (surname)
