= Pierozzi =

Pierozzi is a surname of Italian origin. Notable people with the surname include:

- Antonio Pierozzi (1389–1459), saint by the Catholic Church
- Caterina Angela Pierozzi (c. 1670–1690), Italian painter active in Florence
- Edoardo Pierozzi (born 2001), Italian football player
- Giuseppe Pierozzi (1883–1956), Italian stage and film actor
- Orazio Pierozzi (1884–1919), World War I flying ace

== See also ==
- Piero (disambiguation)
- Pierazzi
