= Charles Francis Smithers =

- Born: November 25, 1822; London, England
- Died: May 20, 1887 (aged 64)
- Occupation: Banker
- Known for: President of the Bank of Montreal

Charles Francis Smithers (November 25, 1822 – May 20, 1887) was a Canadian banker.

Born in London, England, Smithers emigrated to Montreal, Canada East in 1847. He joined the Bank of Montreal in 1858 as an inspector. In 1862, he became a joint agent of the New York branch. He joined the London and Colonial Bank in 1863 before rejoining the Bank in 1869. In 1879, he became a general manager of the Bank and was appointed President in 1881. He served in this position until his death in 1887.

Business positions
| Preceded by George Stephen | President of the Bank of Montreal; 1881–1887 | Succeeded by Donald Smith |
