= Jardins de Métis =

English-style public garden in Quebec

Coordinates: 48.630°N 68.126°W

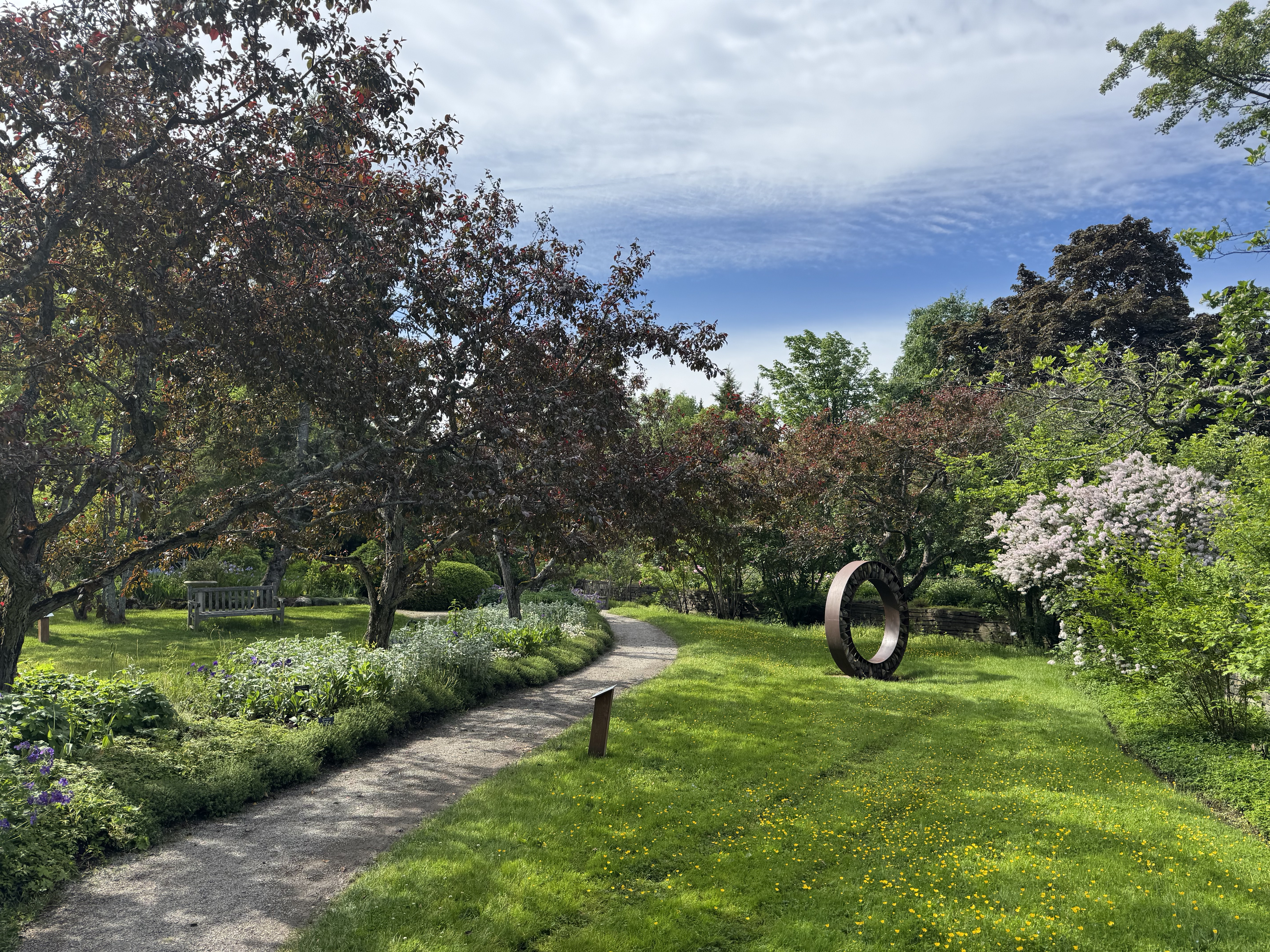
Jardins de Métis

The Jardins de Métis (French pronunciation: [ʒaʁdɛ̃ də metis]), also known in English as the Reford Gardens, is an English-style garden located at Grand-Métis, Quebec. Originally private, the gardens were opened to the public in 1962. The gardens were designated a Canadian National Historic Site in 1995 and as a Quebec heritage site by the Ministry of Culture and Communications of Quebec in 2013.

== Description ==
The property covers about 18 hectares (45 acres). The gardens contain approximately 3,000 plant varieties. Thanks to its location near the confluence of the St. Lawrence and Mitis Rivers, the site has a favourable microclimate which allows plants to grow here that are found nowhere else in Canada.

An International Garden Festival has been held here every year since 2000. The festival features contemporary gardens designed by landscape architects and designers from around the world.

Estevan Lodge, also known as the Villa Reford or Villa Estevan, is a heritage building which was formerly Elsie Reford's summer home. It was built in 1887 and expanded by her in 1926 and 1927, and restored in 2003. Currently it is used as a dining room and also houses temporary exhibits.

== History ==
The gardens were developed by Elsie Reford between 1926 and 1958. The site was originally a fishing lodge owned by George Stephen, Reford's uncle who later gave the property to Reford. While she was recovering from surgery, her doctor suggested that she take up gardening as a less strenuous alternative to fishing.

== Gallery ==
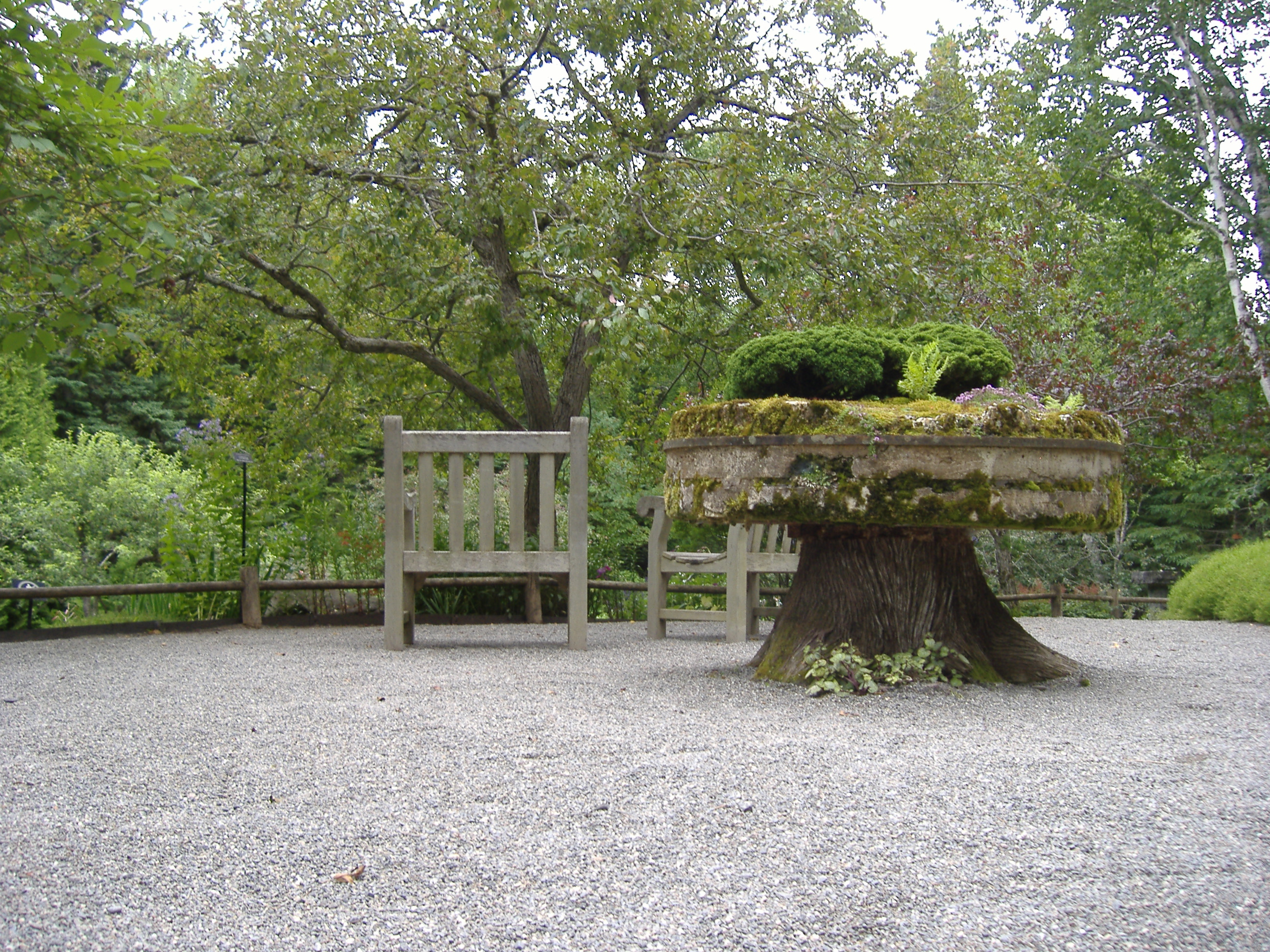
Rest area, 2009

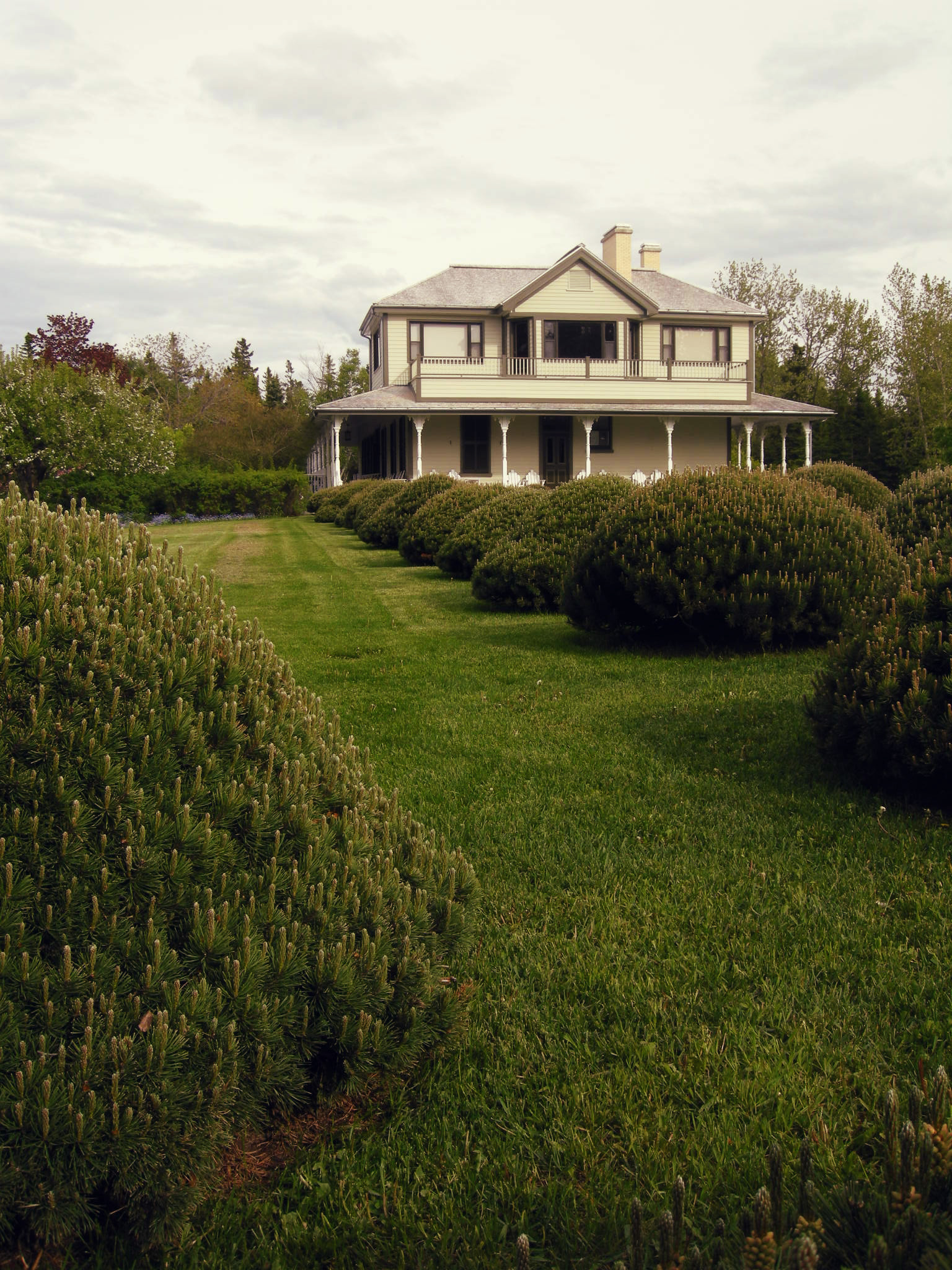
Villa Estevan, 2009

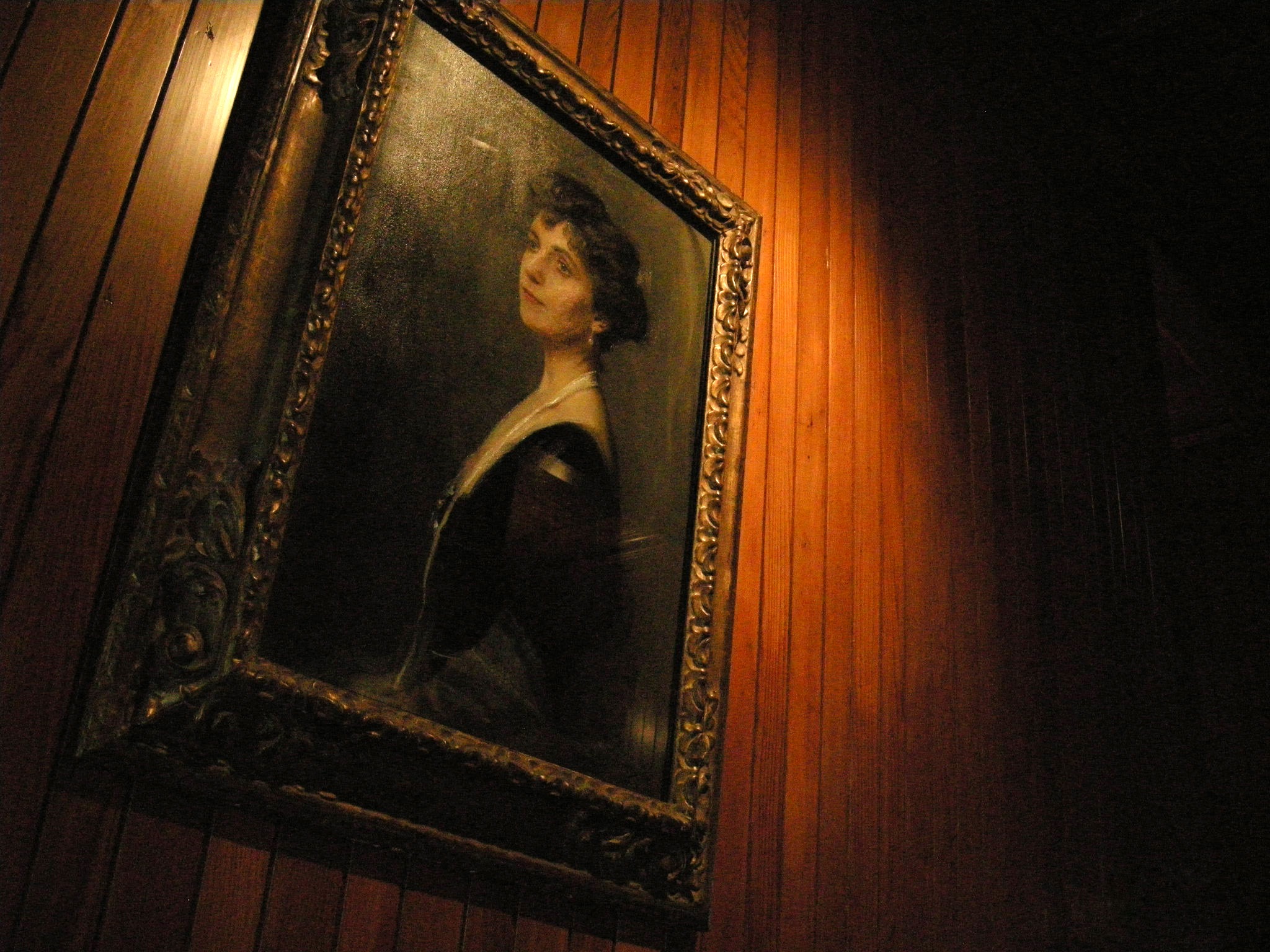
Portrait of Elsie Reford

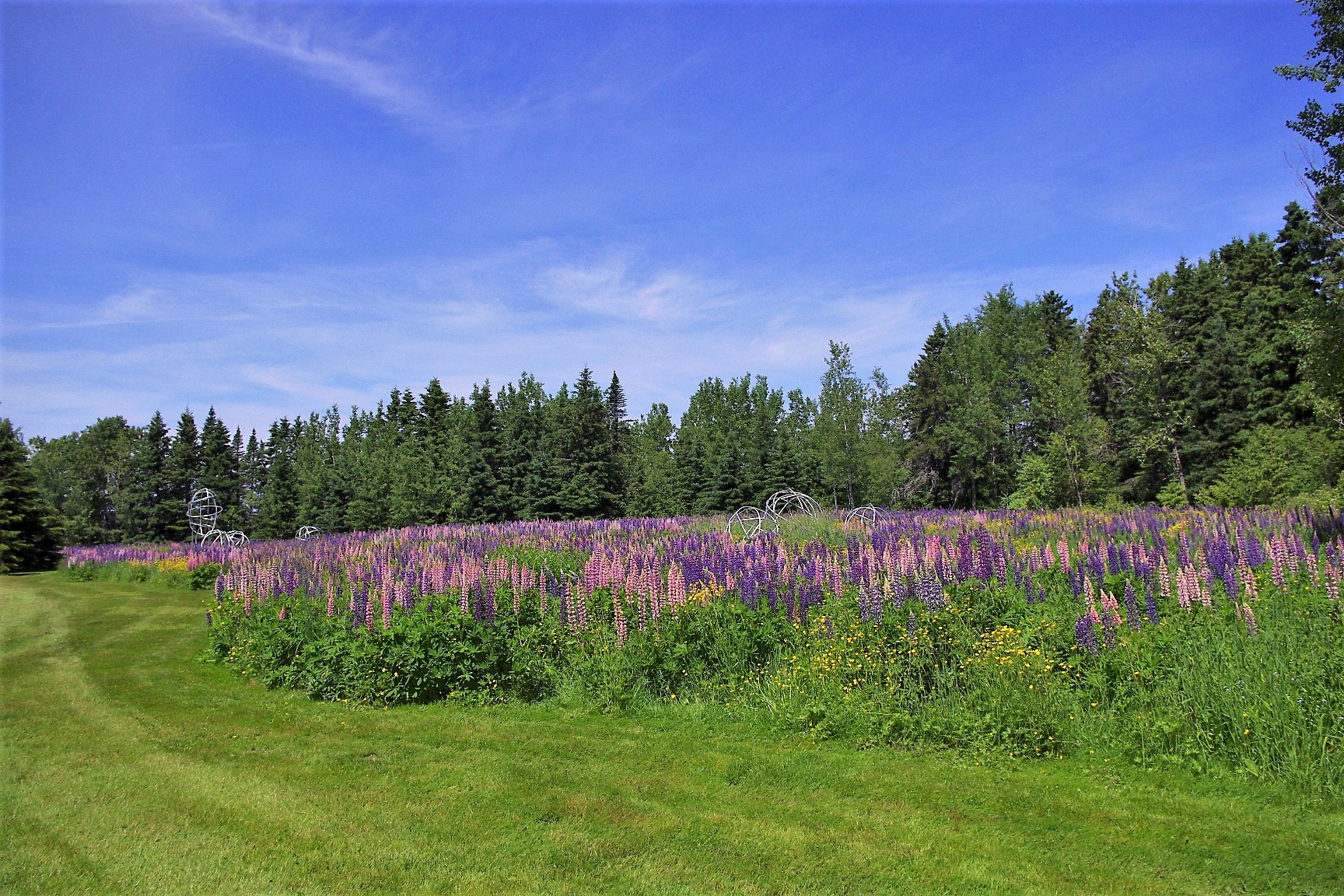
Reford Gardens

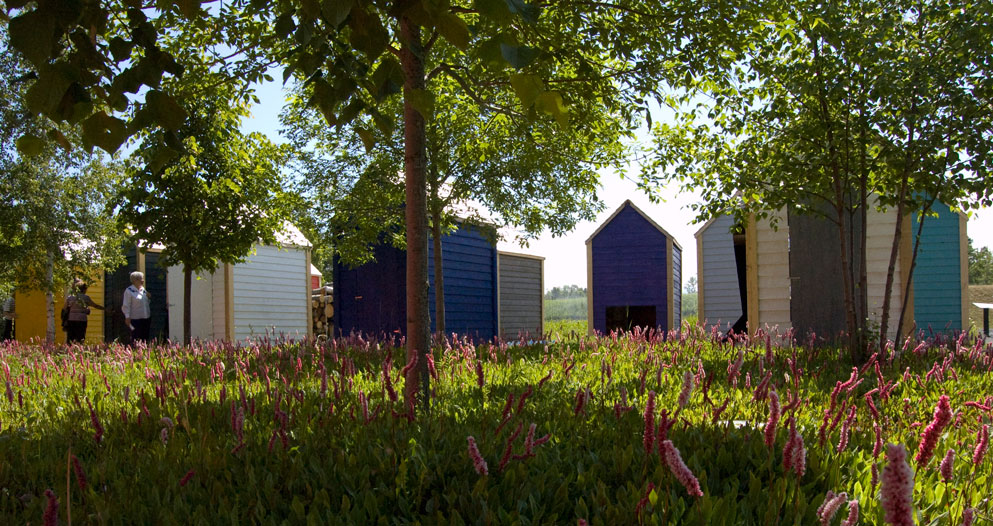
Every garden needs a shed and a lawn, 10th Edition of the International Garden Festival
