= Jean-Charles Perazzi =

French writer and journalist (1936–2021)

- Born: 9 April 1936
- Died: 9 February 2021 (aged 84); Plomelin, France
- Occupations: Writer; Journalist

Jean-Charles Perazzi (9 April 1936 – 9 February 2021) was a French writer and journalist.

== Biography ==
As a journalist, Perazzi worked for the daily newspaper Ouest-France as a Brittany correspondent from 1970 to 1995. Notably, he covered the sinking of the Amoco Cadiz and the failed construction of the Plogoff nuclear power plant. In addition to his journalistic career, he wrote several books on Brittany and kept a "campaign journal" on the website of Agence Bretagne Presse.

Perazzi was also interested in practicing alternative methods of gardening. In September 2014, he won five awards in the "Jardiner Autrement" contest, organized by the National Horticultural Society of France. The contest encouraged gardening techniques without the use of pesticides.

Jean-Charles Perazzi died in Plomelin on 9 February 2021 at the age of 84.

== Publications ==
- Plogoff-la-révolte (1980)
- Le Parc d'Armorique (1988)
- Diwan, vingt ans d'enthousiasme, de doute et d'espoir (1998)
- Au grand désespoir d'Arsène (2000)
- Arsène fait son beurre dans le béton (2001)
- Picou, fils de son père (2001)
- Reporter en Bretagne 25 ans d'histoire contemporaine au quotidien (2004)
- La vache et autres nouvelles du pays (2006)
- L'homme qui ne voulait plus être chauve et autres nouvelles du pays (2006)
- Trompe-la-Mort ou la longue vie de Jean-Baptiste Nicolas (2011)
- Au Jardin Citoyen, photos de Martine Perazzi (2011)
