= St. George's Anglican Church (Montreal) =

Coordinates: 45.4974°N 73.5688°W

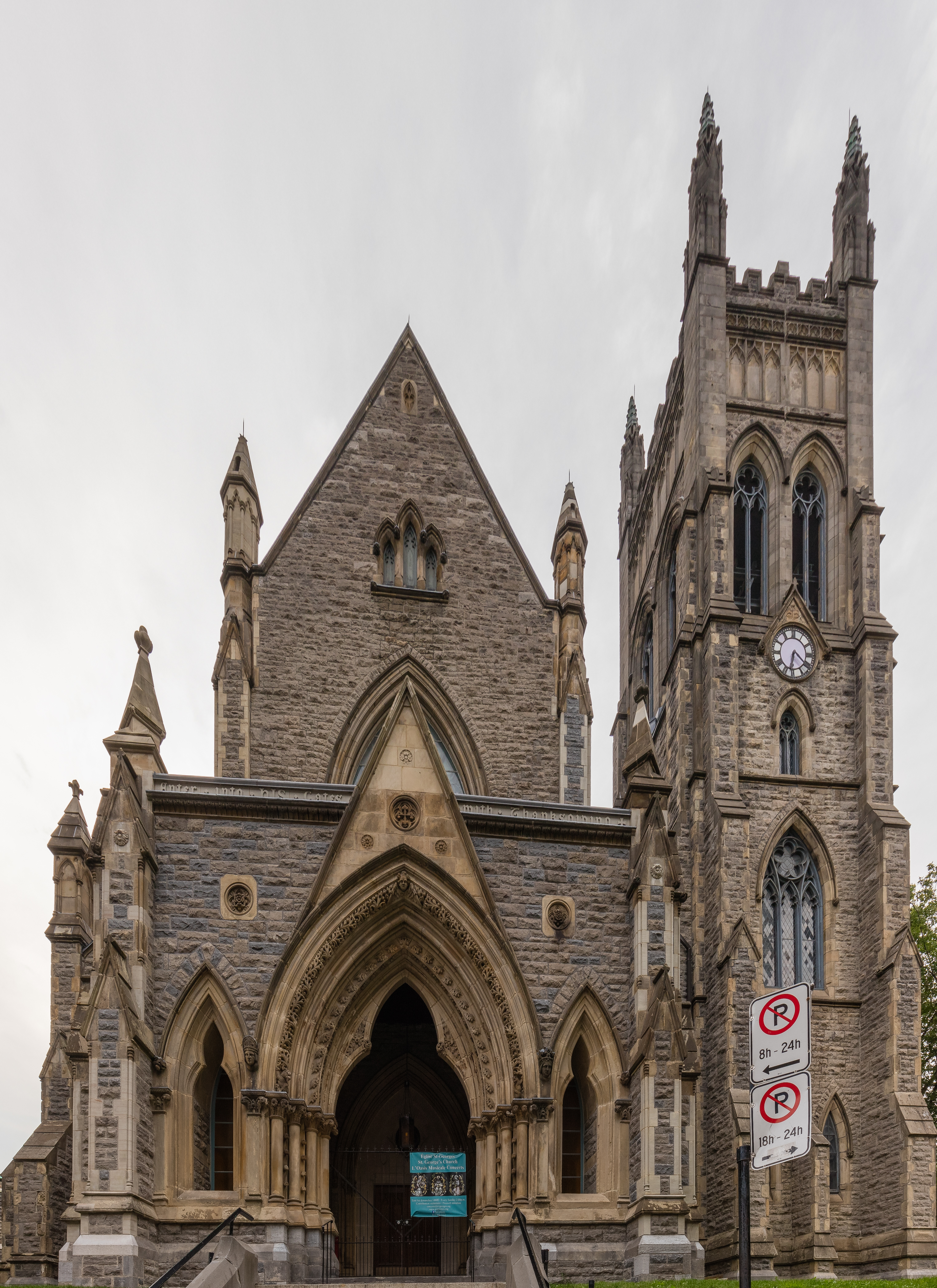
- St. George's Anglican Church seen at the corner of De la Gauchetière Street and Peel Street
- St. George's Anglican Church
- Location: 1101 Stanley Street; Montreal, Quebec
- Denomination: Anglican Church of Canada
- Website: www.st-georgeschurch.org

History
- Status: Active
- Founded: 1843

Architecture
- Heritage designation: National Historic Site of Canada
- Designated: 1990
- Architect: William Tutin Thomas
- Architectural type: Neo-Gothic
- Groundbreaking: 1869
- Completed: 1870

Administration
- Province: Canada
- Diocese: Montreal
- Archdeaconry: Montreal
- Deanery: Hochelaga

Clergy
- Bishop: Victor-David Mbuyi Bipungu
- Rector: Heather Liddell

National Historic Site of Canada
- Official name: St. George's Anglican Church National Historic Site of Canada
- Designated: 1990

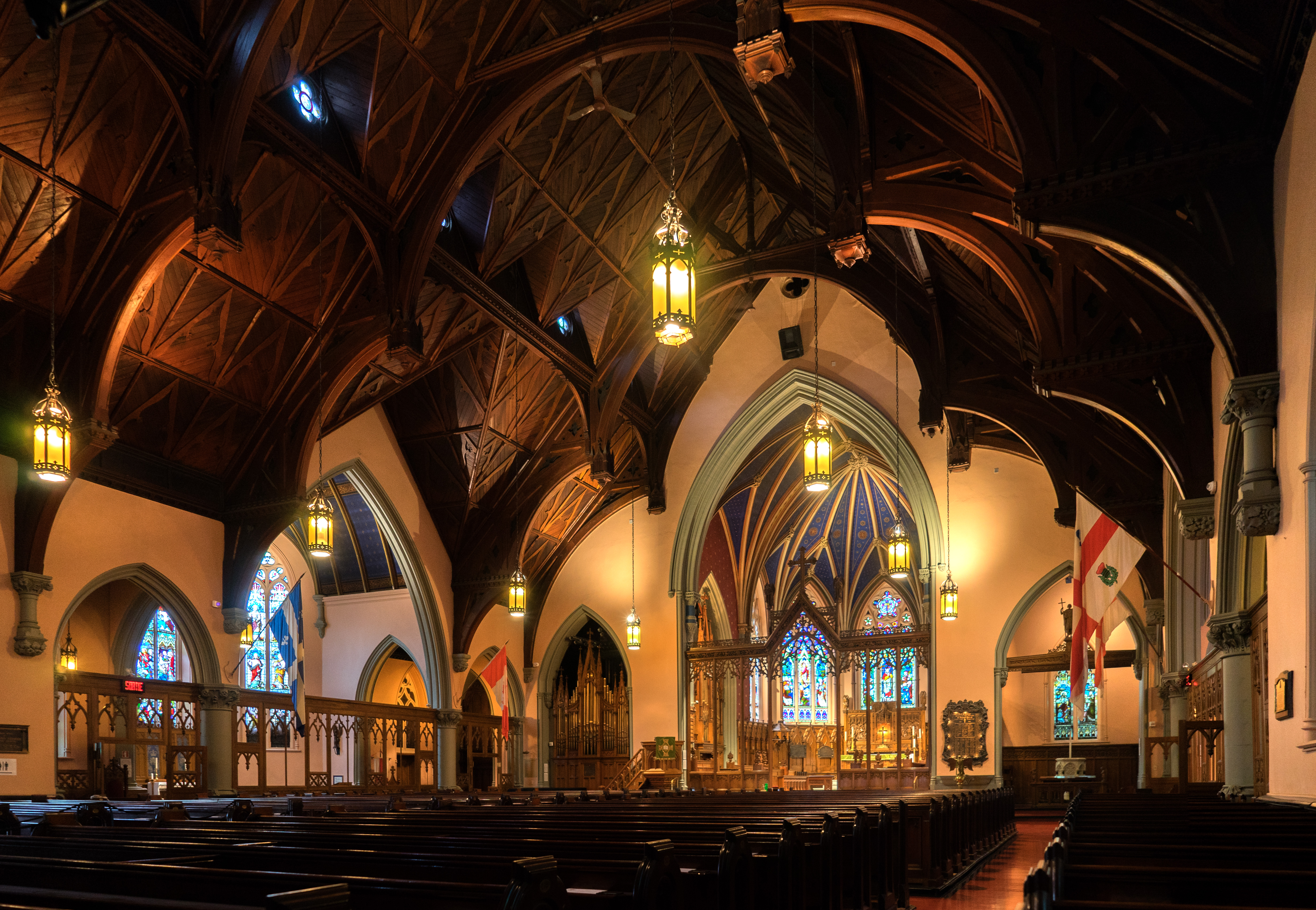
Interior of the church

St. George's Anglican Church is an inclusive Anglican church located in the city's downtown core of Montreal, Quebec, Canada. The church is on the corner of Stanley Street and Av. des Canadiens-de-Montréal. Holy Eucharist (worship) is offered every Sunday at 9:00 AM and 10:30 AM, as well as on Wednesdays at 12:15 PM. All services are open to the public. Outside of services, visitors can come to see the historic interior free of charge, Tuesday - Friday between 12:00 - 2:00 PM.

The church is named for Saint George, the patron saint of England. St. George's Anglican Church was designated as a National Historic Site of Canada in 1990.

Historically, St. George's was considered Montreal's second largest Anglican church and had low church services.

== History ==
The original St. George's Church opened on June 30, 1843, and was on Notre-Dame Street (then Saint Joseph Street) and Saint David's Lane, just outside the city of Montreal's walls. It was the second Anglican congregation in Montreal and was built to accommodate the overflow of parishioners from Christ Church Cathedral. An organ built by Samuel Russell Warren was installed later that year.

The congregation of St. George's continued to grow as the city expanded to the west. A plot of land at the corner of Peel Street and De la Gauchetière Street was chosen as the site of the current church. This piece of land had been a Jewish cemetery from 1775 to 1854. St. George's was designed by Montreal architect William Tutin Thomas, constructed in 1869, and opened its doors on October 9, 1870. The only furnishing retained from the old church was the pulpit. The old church would serve as a factory for organ-maker Samuel Russell Warren.

The parishioners of St. Jude Church (corner of Coursol Street and Vinet Street in Little Burgundy) and Church of the Advent (corner De Maisonneuve Boulevard and Wood Avenue in Westmount) joined those of St. George's following their churches' closures.

== Architecture ==
The church serves as an example of English Gothic Revival architecture, and was very heavily inspired by 13th-century religious architecture in medieval England. A few of these features include the use of pointed arches and pinnacles.

The bell tower was completed in 1894 and designed by Montreal architect Alexander Francis Dunlop.

The exterior was constructed in carved sandstone with stained glass windows, and the interior is devoid of any pillars, and features traditional English woodwork inside the chapel. The church is also notable for its ceiling beams, which are among the largest in the world. The exposed double-beam hammer roof is second in the world only to the Westminster Hall in span. The tapestry originates from Westminster Abbey in London, where it was used during the coronation of Queen Elizabeth II.

The interior features dark wood paneling.

The three-light congregational war memorial window by Charles William Kelsey depicts angels holding shields representing the Navy, Army, and Air Force. Below the Army panel is written "He will swallow up death in victory and the Lord God will wipe away all tears from all faces, Isaiah 25:8." Below the Air Force Panel is written "Out of weakness made strong, waxed valiant in fight, turned to flight the armies of the aliens, Hebrews II:34". Below the Navy Panel is written "They that go down to the sea in ships, these see the works of the Lord and His wonders of the deep, Psalm 107:23".
