= William Tutin Thomas =

Canadian architect (1829–1892)

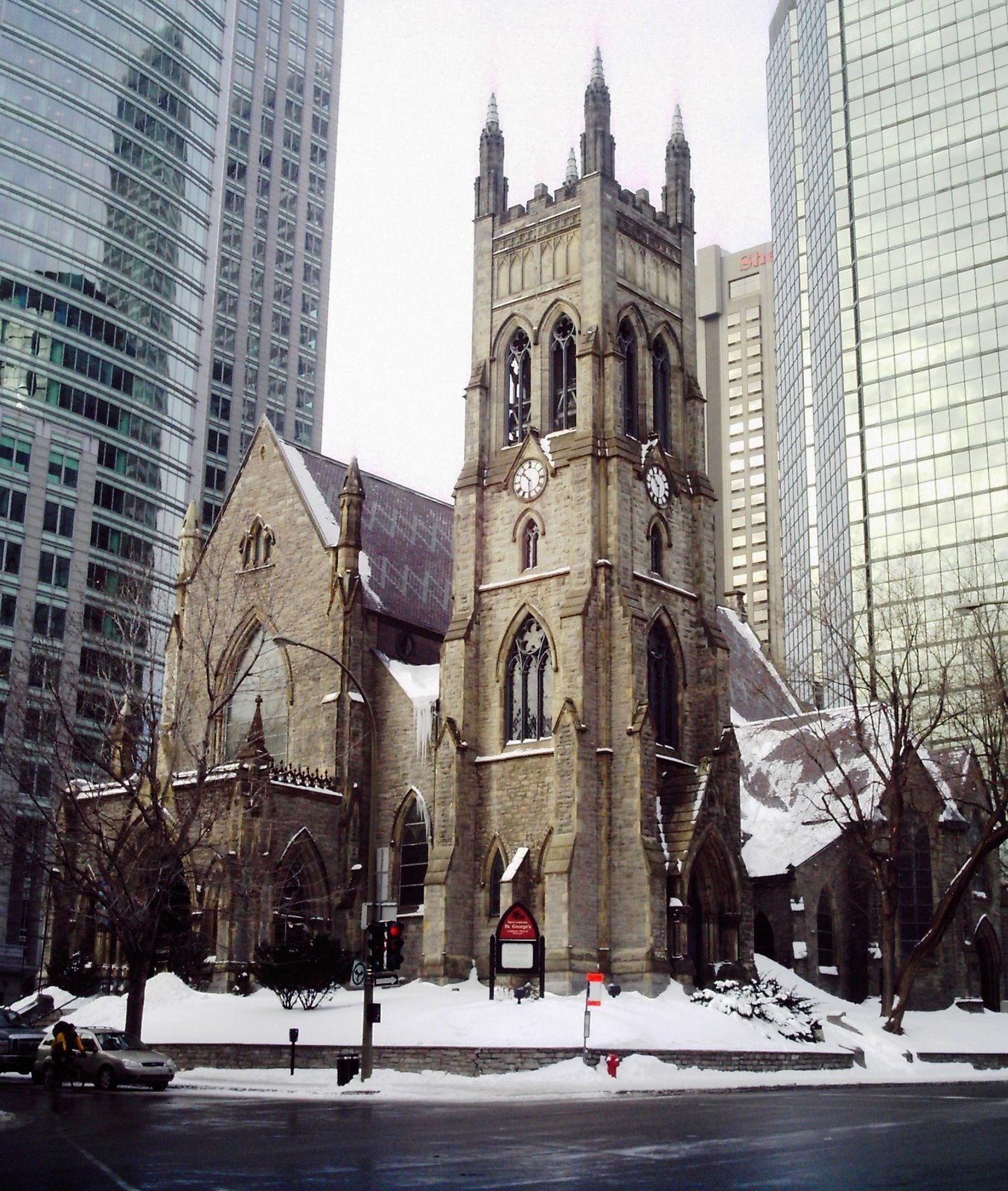
- St. George's Anglican Church (Montreal)
- Born: 1829; Birmingham, England
- Died: 1892 (aged 62–63); Montreal, Quebec, Canada
- Occupation: Architect
- Practice: Architecture
- Buildings: St. George's Anglican Church (Montreal); Church of St. John the Evangelist (Montreal); Shaughnessy House

William Tutin Thomas (1829–1892) was a Canadian architect.

== Life and career ==
Born in Birmingham, England, he was the son of architect William Thomas. He worked for a few years with his father, and also with his brother, Cyrus. His father emigrated with his family from England to live in Montreal, and there together they made many fine buildings, including some notable shopping arcades in Montreal, and many buildings in Old Montreal (such as the Dominion Block, the Recollet House, and the Caverhill Block). His association with his brother Cyrus finished around 1870 when Cyrus decided to pursue his career in Chicago.

Thomas continued on with his work, mostly in Montreal. He designed the St. George's Anglican Church (Montreal) (1869–1870) and the Church of St. John the Evangelist (Montreal) (1877–1879). He built many residential buildings for the upper middle classes of Montreal, notably the George Stephen House, later known as the Mount Stephen Club (1882–1884), and the house of Thomas Shaughnessy (1874–1875, which is now part of the Canadian Centre for Architecture. He also designed many buildings in other Canadian provinces.

He was a founding member of the Royal Canadian Academy of Arts.

== Work ==
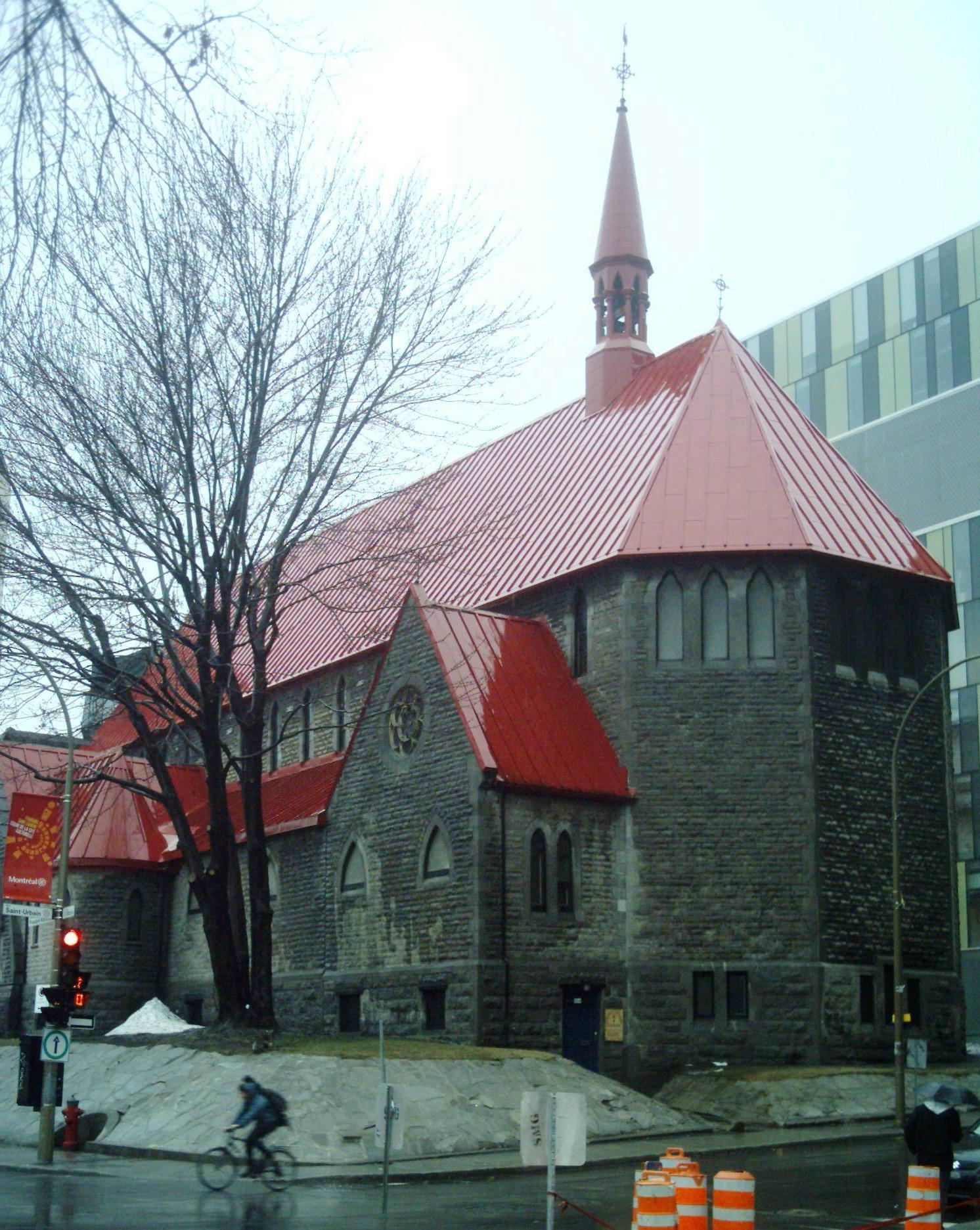
Church of St. John the Evangelist (Montreal)

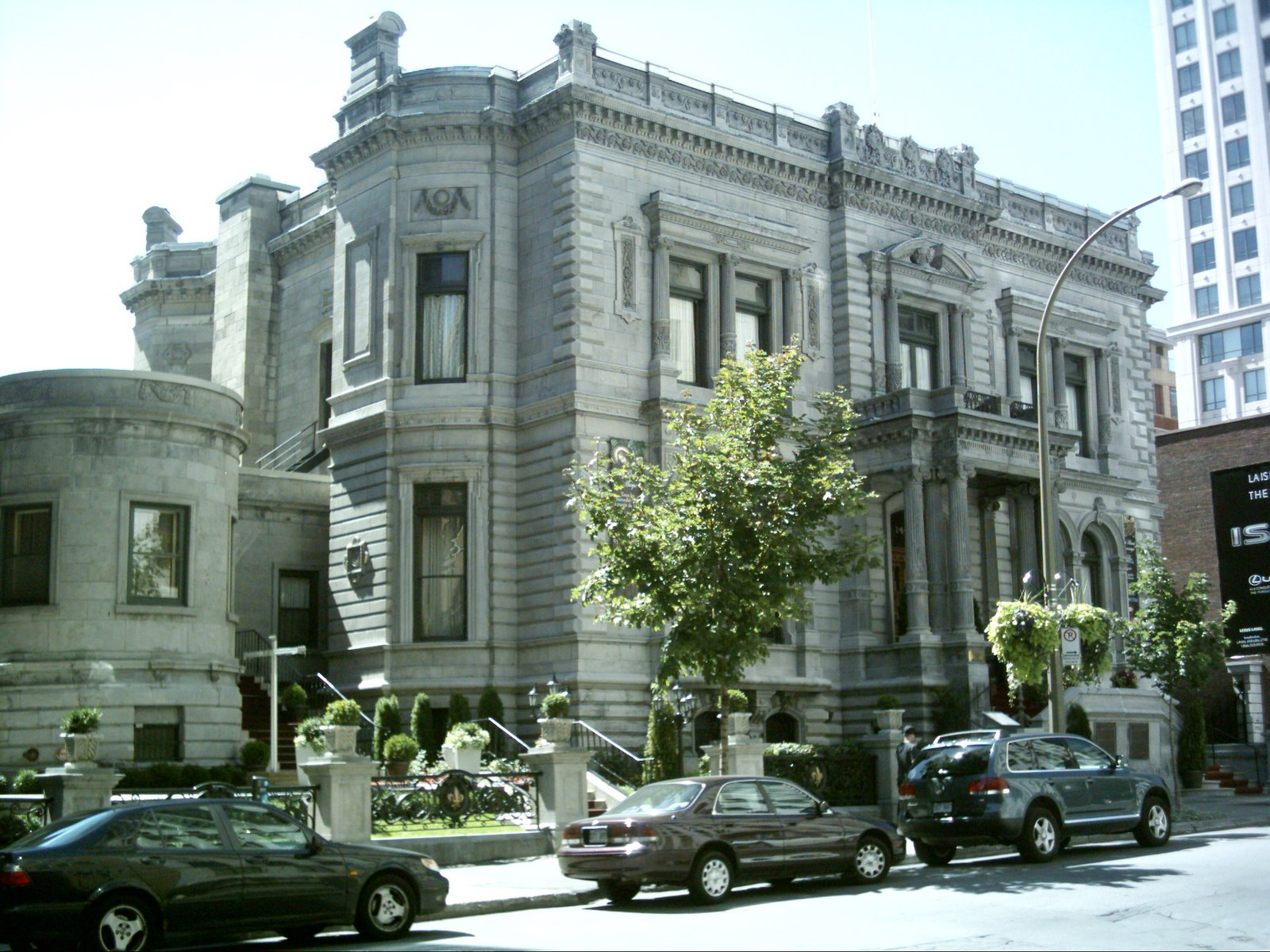
George Stephen House

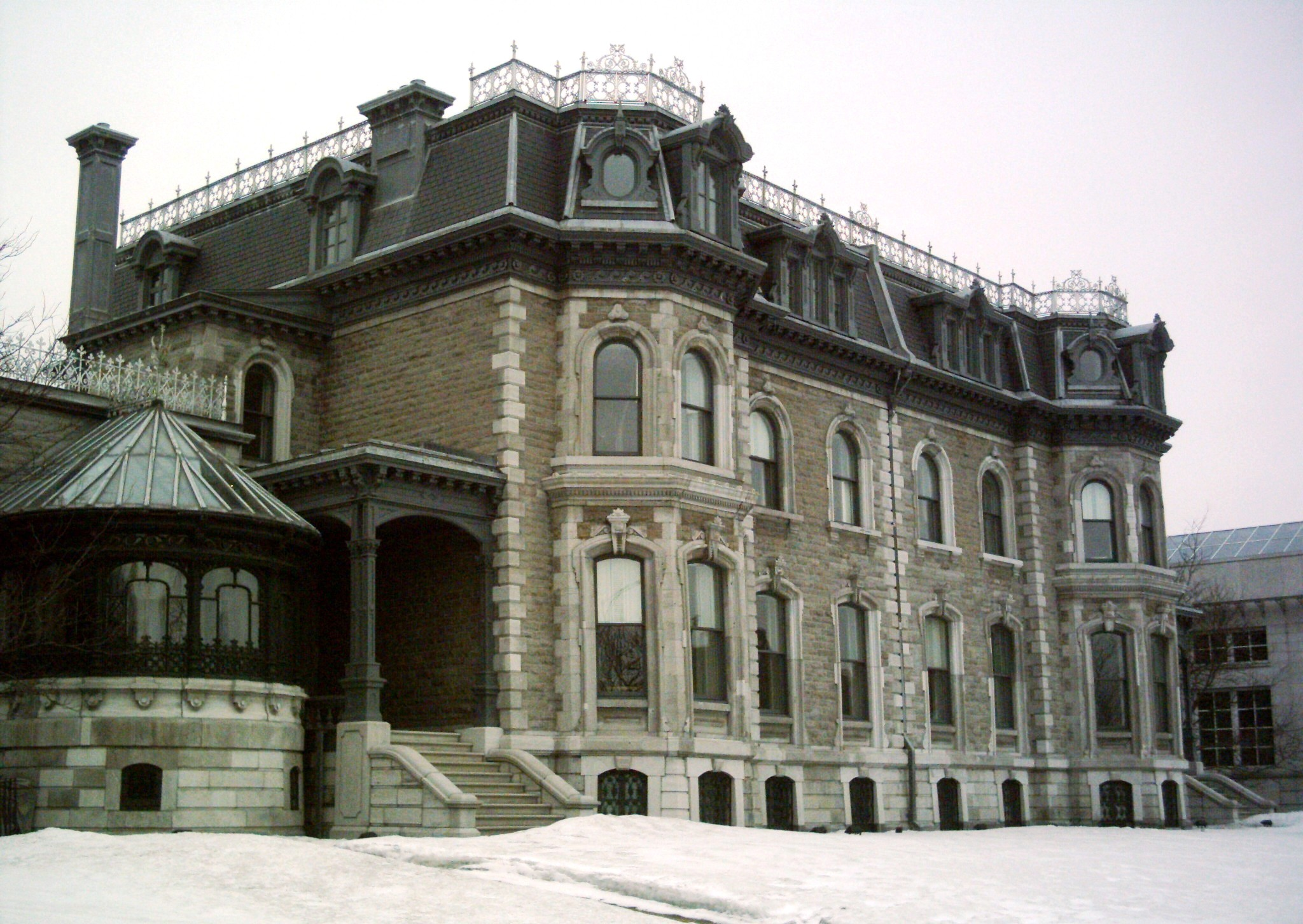
Canadian Centre for Architecture

== See also ==
- Architecture of Canada
- Architecture of Montreal
