= Robert Wilson Reford Sr. =

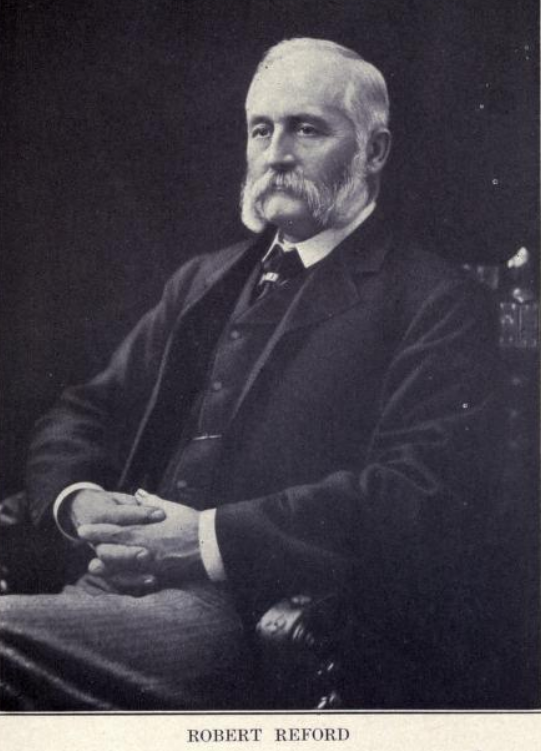

Robert Wilson Reford (3 August 1831 – 15 March 1913) was a businessman and philanthropist born in County Antrim, Northern Ireland. Reford emigrated to Canada and became one of the most successful businessmen of his generation. Perhaps best known for his shipping interests, he amassed a fortune based on a variety of business pursuits from Montreal.

Born 1831 at Spring Farm, Moylinny, Co. Antrim, he was the son of Joseph Reford (1794-1834) and Grizel (Grace) Simonton Wilson. His father had owned three linen mills and the largest bleach works in Ireland, which had been established a century before by Reford's great-grandfather, a prominent Quaker. However, Joseph was duped by his local business rival, William Chaine (1778-1862) of Ballycraigy House, in a game of cards that was rigged for him to lose. On leaving Ballycraigy that night, Reford's father had lost his entire business empire. Penniless, Joseph was forced to become an apprentice to a cabinetmaker, while Chaine rocketed to fabulous wealth.

Lord O'Neill of Shane's Castle took pity on his friend's family and took in two of Joseph's two daughters, while their mother moved her remaining three children to Belfast, where Robert was educated at the Royal Belfast Academical Institution. In 1845, Mrs Reford took her remaining three children, including Robert, to Toronto.

== See also ==
- Robert Wilson Reford
