= Grand-Métis =

- Municipality
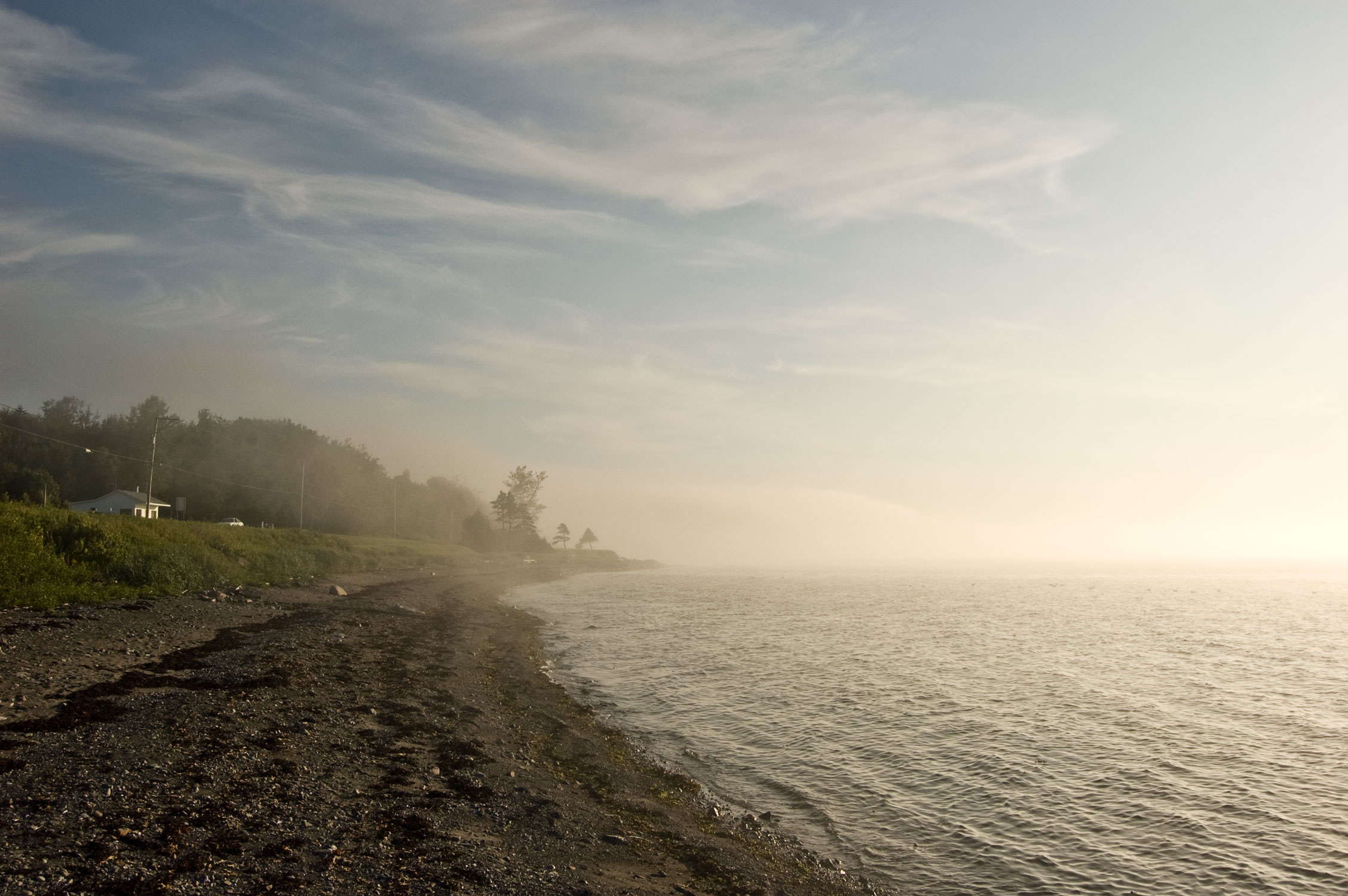

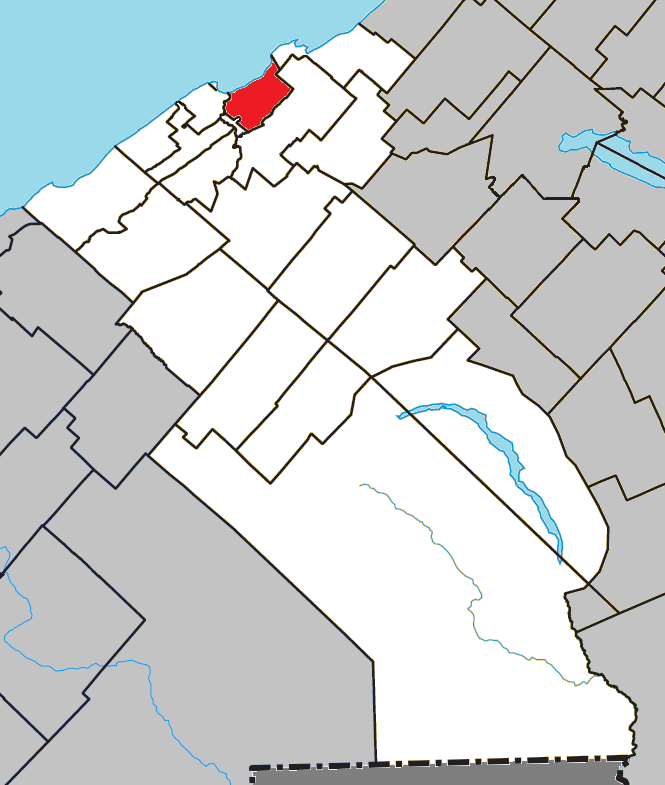
- Location within La Mitis RCM

- Location in eastern Quebec
- Coordinates: 48.63°N 68.13°W
- Country: Canada
- Province: Quebec
- Region: Bas-Saint-Laurent
- RCM: La Mitis
- Constituted: September 13, 1855

Government
  - Mayor: Jocelyn Fournier
  - Federal riding: Rimouski-Neigette—Mitis—Matapédia—Les Basques
  - Prov. riding: Matane-Matapédia-Mitis

Area
  - Total: 25.30 km^{2} (9.77 sq mi)
  - Land: 25.12 km^{2} (9.70 sq mi)

Population (2021)
  - Total: 218
  - Density: 8.7/km^{2} (23/sq mi)
  - Pop 2016-2021: ▲2.3%
  - Dwellings: 206
- Time zone: UTC−5 (EST)
  - Summer (DST): UTC−4 (EDT)
- Postal code(s): G0J 1Z0
- Area codes: 418 and 581
- Highways: R-132; R-234
- Website: www.municipalite. grand-metis.qc.ca

Grand-Métis (French pronunciation: [ɡʁɑ̃ metis]) is a municipality in the La Mitis Regional County Municipality within the Bas-Saint-Laurent region of Quebec, Canada. It is situated where the Mitis River meets the Saint Lawrence River, and was developed from 1818 by the pioneering John MacNider.

The names "Métis" and "Mitis" are said to come from a Mi'kmaq word meaning "meeting place" or another referring to willow or poplar trees.

== Demographics ==
In the 2021 Census of Population conducted by Statistics Canada, Grand-Métis had a population of 218 living in 122 of its 206 total private dwellings, a change of 2.3% from its 2016 population of 213. With a land area of 25.12 km^{2} (9.70 sq mi), it had a population density of 8.7/km^{2} (22.5/sq mi) in 2021.

=== Population ===
Canada census – Grand-Métis community profile

| | 2021 | 2016 | 2011 |
| Population | 218 (+2.3% from 2016) | 167 (-29.5% from 2011) | 237 (-11.6% from 2006) |
| Land area | 25.12 km^{2} (9.70 sq mi) | 25.55 km^{2} (9.86 sq mi) | 25.66 km^{2} (9.91 sq mi) |
| Population density | 8.7/km^{2} (23/sq mi) | 6.5/km^{2} (17/sq mi) | 9.2/km^{2} (24/sq mi) |
| Median age | 59.2 (M: 59.2, F: 58.8) | 59.2 (M: 61.0, F: 55.5) | 55.5 (M: 56.9, F: 53.5) |
| Private dwellings | 206 (total) 122 (occupied) | 191 (total) | 176 (total) |
| Median household income | $n/a | $n/a | $n/a |

References: 2021 2016 2011

Historical Census Data - Grand-Métis, Quebec
| Year | Pop. | ±% |
|---|---|---|
| 1911 | 2,645 | — |
| 1921 | 1,903 | −28.1% |
| 1931 | 289 | −84.8% |
| 1941 | 577 | +99.7% |
| 1951 | 383 | −33.6% |
| 1956 | 439 | +14.6% |
| 1961 | 414 | −5.7% |
| 1966 | 387 | −6.5% |
| 1971 | 356 | −8.0% |
| 1976 | 339 | −4.8% |
| 1981 | 342 | +0.9% |
| 1986 | 327 | −4.4% |
| 1991 | 287 | −12.2% |
| 1996 | 276 | −3.8% |
| 2001 | 281 | +1.8% |
| 2006 | 268 | −4.6% |
| 2011 | 237 | −11.6% |
| 2016 | 213 | −10.1% |
| 2021 | 218 | +2.3% |

=== Language ===
Canada Census Mother Tongue - Grand-Métis, Quebec
| Census | Total | French | | | English | | | French & English | | | Other | | |
| Year | Responses | Count | Trend | Pop % | Count | Trend | Pop % | Count | Trend | Pop % | Count | Trend | Pop % |
| 2021 | 220 | 200 | ▲29.0% | 90.9% | 10 | ▲100.0% | 4.5% | 5 | ▲ n/a% | 2.3% | 0 | 0.0% | 0.0% |
| 2016 | 170 | 155 | ▼20.5% | 91.2% | 5 | ▼50.0% | 2.9% | 0 | ▼100.0% | 0.0% | 0 | 0.0% | 0.0% |
| 2011 | 220 | 195 | ▼22.0% | 88.6% | 10 | ▲ n/a% | 4.5% | 5 | ▲ n/a% | 2.3% | 0 | 0.0% | 0.0% |
| 2006 | 245 | 250 | ▲6.4% | 100.0% | 0 | ▼100.0% | 0.0% | 0 | 0.0% | 0.0% | 0 | 0.0% | 0.0% |
| 2001 | 260 | 235 | ▼4.1% | 90.4% | 20 | ▲ n/a% | 7.7% | 0 | 0.0% | 0.0% | 0 | ▼100.0% | 0.0% |
| 1996 | 260 | 245 | n/a | 94.2% | 0 | n/a | 0.0% | 0 | n/a | 0.0% | 10 | n/a | 3.8% |

== Attractions ==
The historic Reford Gardens (Jardins de Métis) are located nearby. These gardens, now maintained by Les Amis des Jardins de Métis, are the result of Elsie Reford's extraordinary passion for horticulture. An International Garden Festival is held here each summer. The garden's symbol, the Himalayan Blue Poppy (Meconopsis betonicifolia), can be found growing there in summer. The gardens were designated a National Historic Site of Canada in 1995.

== See also ==
- List of municipalities in Quebec
