= Nathalie Cooke =

Canadian literary scholar

M. Nathalie Cooke
- Born: Chennai, India
- Citizenship: Canadian
- Occupations: Professor, literary scholar
- Awards: Gabrielle Roy Prize (2023); Fellow of the Royal Society of Canada (2025)

Academic background
- Education: B.A., Queen's University; M.A., Cornell University; B.Ed., M.A., Ph.D., University of Toronto
- Alma mater: Queen's University; Cornell University; University of Toronto

Academic work
- Discipline: Literary studies, food studies
- Sub-discipline: Canadian literature, women's life writing, social food history
- Institutions: McGill University
- Main interests: Menus as cultural artifacts, Canadian culinary history, history of the tea industry
- Notable works: Margaret Atwood: A Biography (1998); Canadian Literary Fare (2023); Tastes and Traditions (2025)

M. Nathalie Cooke (born 27 December 1960) is a Canadian literary scholar and full professor in the Department of English and Department of History and Classical Studies at McGill University whose work spans Canadian literature, women's life writing, and interdisciplinary food studies. She is known for research that examines menus, cookbooks, and culinary ephemera as historical documents illuminating social values, cultural exchange, and everyday life. She is known for research that examines menus, cookbooks, and culinary ephemera as historical documents illuminating social values, cultural exchange, and everyday life. Her publications include Margaret Atwood: A Biography (1998), Canadian Literary Fare (2023), which received the Gabrielle Roy Prize for literary criticism, and Tastes and Traditions: An Illustrated Journey Through Menu History (2025). In 2025, she was elected a Fellow of the Royal Society of Canada.

== Education ==
Born in Chennai, Cooke was raised in England and on Vancouver Island. She holds a B.A. from Queen's University, an M.A. from Cornell University, and an M.A. and Ph.D. from the University of Toronto. She also holds a B.Ed. from the University of Toronto.

== Research and scholarship ==
Cooke's scholarship approaches food studies as a method of social and cultural history, using culinary texts and practices to study how everyday choices reflect broader social values, economic conditions, and cultural continuity. A central contribution of her work is the treatment of menus as historical documents rather than as purely utilitarian objects. In peer-reviewed publications, she has argued that menus record social hierarchy, technological change, patterns of migration, and moments of crisis, including wartime and carceral contexts.

Her work on menu history has been noted for expanding the study of food beyond questions of taste by situating menus within political, diplomatic, and commemorative frameworks. Reviewers have emphasized her analysis of menus as sites where aspiration, constraint, and memory intersect, especially in contexts of scarcity or displacement.

In studies of Canadian food culture, Cooke has challenged the notion of a single national cuisine. She described Canadian foodways as “culinarily multilingual,” shaped by successive waves of migration and ongoing cultural exchange.

Scholars citing her work have stressed that this framework foregrounds hybridity and adaptation rather than culinary uniformity, hence offering an alternative to nation-centred models of food history.

Cooke has also investigated tensions between regional food traditions and national standardization in the twentieth century, particularly through print and broadcast media. Her research on Canadian food personalities such as Kate Aitken and Jehane Benoît considers them as cultural intermediaries who helped construct shared food narratives while preserving regional diversity.

She has also researched the transnational history of the tea industry, based on archival materials to trace historical links between South Asia, Britain, and Canada.

== Career ==
Cooke is a professor in the Department of English at McGill University, where she has held a number of senior academic and administrative roles. She served as associate dean of arts (research and graduate studies) from 2006 to 2010 and as associate university provost (academic staff and priority initiatives) from 2010 to 2013. From 2016 to 2022, she was associate dean of McGill University Library, with responsibility for rare books, special collections, and archives.

She is the founding editor of Cuizine: The Journal of Canadian Food Cultures, a peer-reviewed open-access journal established in 2008 and published by McGill University Libraries.

In 2023, Cooke held a visiting fellowship at the Centre for the Study of Religion and Society at the University of Victoria. In 2024, she was a visiting research fellow at the University of Glasgow, where she conducted archival research in the Scottish Business Archives. She is also a member of Le Centre de recherche interuniversitaire sur les humanités numériques (CRIHN).

In 2025, Cooke was elected a Fellow of the Royal Society of Canada.

== Selected work ==
- Cooke, Nathalie. Margaret Atwood: A Biography. Toronto: ECW Press, 1998.
- Cooke, Nathalie. Margaret Atwood: A Critical Companion.Westport, CT: Greenwood Press, 2004.
- Cooke, Nathalie, ed. What's to Eat? Entrées in Canadian Food History. Montreal: McGill-Queen's University Press, 2009.
- Cooke, Nathalie, Shelley Boyd, and Alexia Moyer. Canadian Literary Fare. Montreal: McGill-Queen's University Press, 2023.
- Cooke, Nathalie. Tastes and Traditions: An Illustrated Journey Through Menu History. London: Reaktion Books, 2025.

== Awards ==
- Gabrielle Roy Prize from the Association for Canadian and Québec Literatures for Canadian Literary Fare (2023)
- Society for the History of Natural History President's Medal for "The Gwillim Project" (2022)
