= McGill University Libraries =

Library system of McGill University in Montreal, Canada

Coordinates: 45°30′12″N 73°34′36″W

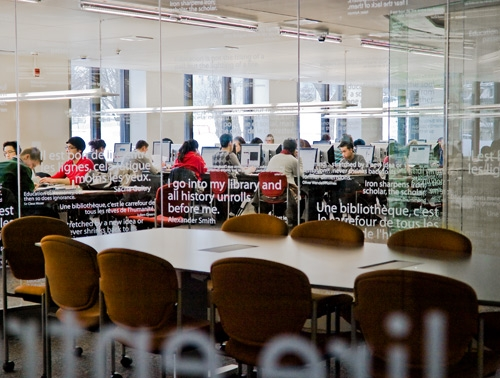
- Location: Montreal, Quebec, Canada
- Type: Academic library
- Branches: 13

Collection
- Size: 11.8 million items

Other information
- Budget: C$42.271 million (2018)
- Employees: 235
- Parent organization: McGill University
- Affiliation: ARL; CARL
- Website: mcgill.ca/libraries

The McGill University Libraries system is the academic library of McGill University in Montreal, Quebec, Canada. It comprises 13 branch libraries, located on the downtown Montreal and Macdonald campuses, holding over 11.78 million items. It is the fourth-largest research intensive academic library in Canada.

== Description ==
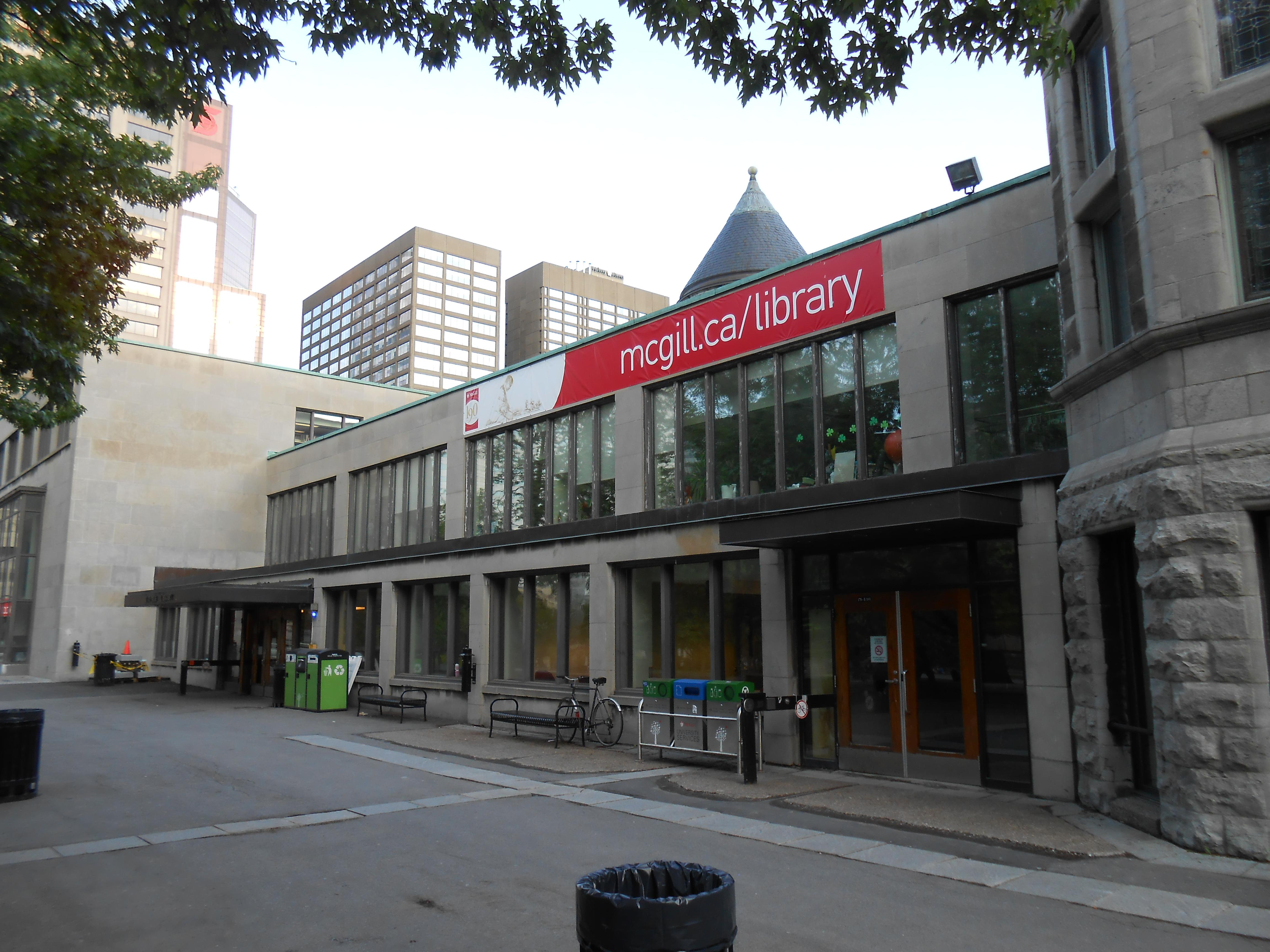
Humanities and Social Sciences Library

The largest of the branch libraries is the Humanities and Social Sciences Library, which is housed in the McLennan and Redpath Library Buildings. The Humanities and Social Sciences Library has notable collections in Canadian Studies, English and American Literature, British History, Russian and East European Studies, and World War II.

The Library's ROAAr Group was formed in 2016 to unite Rare Books and Special Collections, The Osler Library of the History of Medicine, The Visual Arts Collection, and Archives and Records Management.

Rare Books and Special collections contains holdings on a variety of subjects, including art and architecture, Canadiana, history, literature, the history of ideas, travel and exploration, and the history of the book. The Lawrence Lande Collection of Canadiana consists of 12,000 items, including books, pamphlets, maps, prints, periodicals, government documents, and broadsides.

The Osler Library of the History of Medicine, in the McIntyre Medical Building, is Canada's foremost scholarly resource in the history of medicine, and one of the most important libraries of its type in North America. As of 2011, the Humanities and Social Sciences Library and the Schulich Library of Physical Sciences, Life Sciences, and Engineering are open 24/7 in most cases during midterms and finals during the academic year.

The Islamic Studies Library, located in Morrice Hall with the McGill University Institute of Islamic Studies that prepares graduate students for M.A. and Ph.D. degrees, is one of the largest collections of its kind in Canada.

The McGill University Libraries' Cyberthèque opened its doors to McGill students in 2008. Located in the Redpath Library Building at street level, Cyberthèque contains study spaces, technology and multi-media installations, and assistance in accessing information. This facility was designed by Montréal architect François Emond and his team at ékm architecture, in conjunction with Douglas Birkenshaw and his team at Bregmann + Hamann from Toronto.

== Branch libraries ==
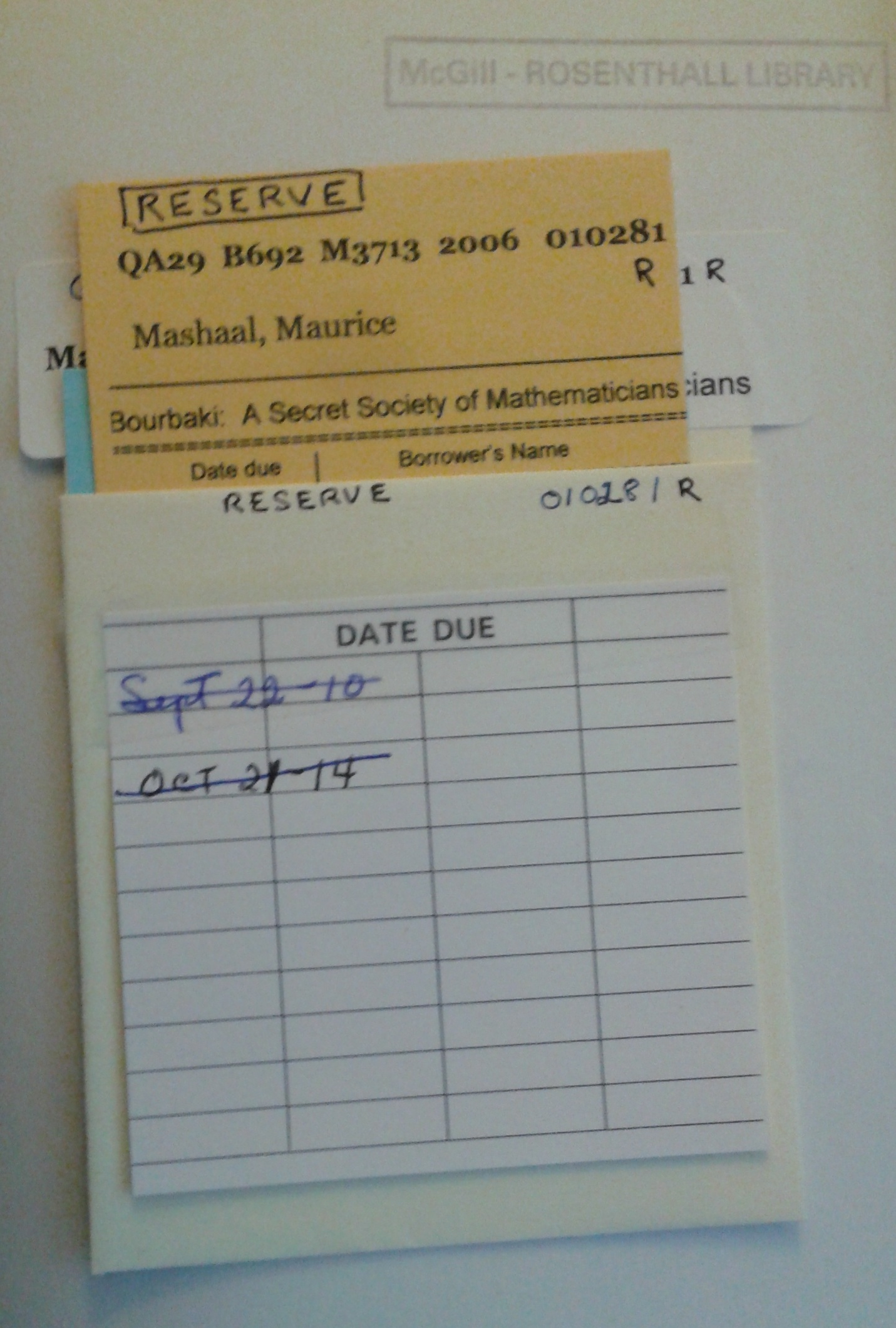
Date-due slip inside a book belonging to the (now defunct) Rosenthall Library. The book in question is Bourbaki: A Secret Society of Mathematicians by Maurice Mashaal, translated from the original French by Anne Pierrehumbert.

- Birks Reading Room (William and Henry Birks Building, 2nd fl.)
- McLennan Humanities and Social Sciences Library (McLennan-Redpath Complex)
- Blackader-Lauterman Collection of Architecture and Art
- Islamic Studies Library (Morrice Hall)
- Education Curriculum Resource Centre (Education Building, 1st fl.)
- Edward Rosenthall Library of Mathematics and Statistics (Burnside Hall, Rm. 1105), now defunct
- Life Sciences Library (McIntyre Medical Building, 3rd fl.), merged with the Osler and Schulich libraries
- MacDonald Campus Library (Barton Building, 2nd fl.)
- Marvin Duchow Music Library (Elizabeth Wirth Music Building, 3rd fl.)
- Nahum Gelber Law Library
- Schulich Library of Physical Sciences, Life Sciences, and Engineering (Macdonald-Stewart Library Building)
- Osler Library of the History of Medicine (McIntyre Medical Building, 3rd fl.)
- Rare Books and Special Collections (McLennan Library Building, 4th fl.)
- McGill University Archives (McLennan Library Building, 4th fl.)
- Visual Arts Collection (McLennan Library Building, 4th fl.)

== Partnerships and collaboration ==
The Library is a member of the Canadian Association of Research Libraries, the Association of Research Libraries (ARL), and the Conférence des recteurs et des principaux des universités du Québec (CREPUQ), as well as other cooperative groups. The Library is a contributor to the Open Content Alliance

== Projects ==
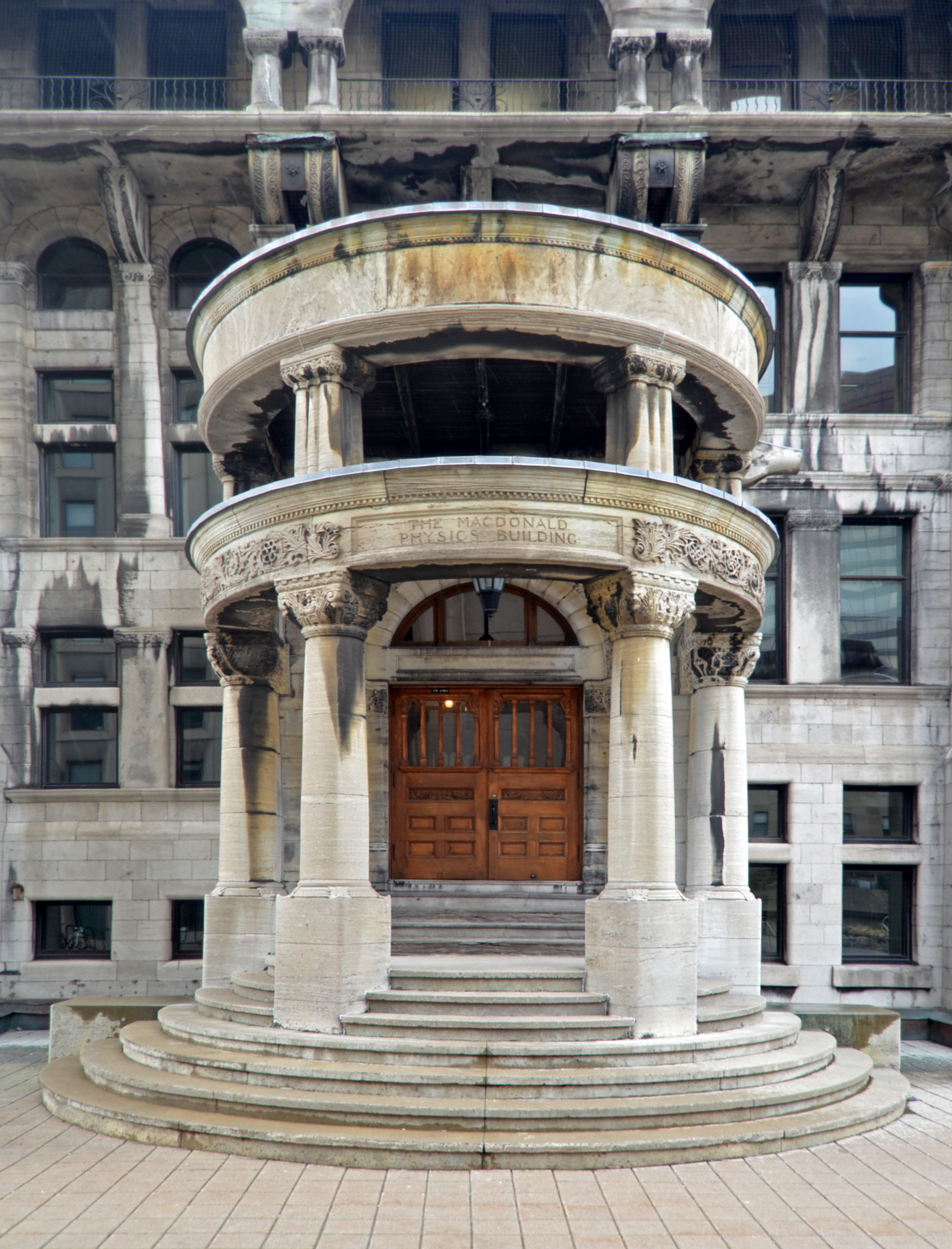
The Macdonald Physics Building is now the Macdonald-Stewart Library Building. This entrance is no longer in use. The Department of Physics is located at the Rutherford Physics Building.

As of 2010, one of the Library's major projects involves digitization of books in the public domain. In 2013 the McGill library became the second non-US based partner institution with HathiTrust digital library and plans on making their digitized collections available through this repository. The library regularly contributes unique digitized public domain from their collections to the Internet Archive.

== History ==
From 1862 to 1893 the library was located in the west wing of the Arts Building (Molson Hall), where the collection slowly expanded. In 1893 the Redpath Library opened in what is now Redpath Hall. At the same time, the first full-time University Librarian, Charles H. Gould (1893–1919) was appointed. Under Gould and Gerhard Lomer (1920–1947) both the collection and staff expanded. By the 1920s and 1930s the central library's lack of space meant that there was more departmental and area libraries being established.

In 1952 a large addition to Redpath Hall was opened to the south and the east wall of the original building was enclosed. It was at this time the library reading room was moved over what is now known at the Redpath library building and the Hall became a music hall. It was during this time that the University Librarian became primarily responsible for this main library collection that covered the humanities and social sciences discipline. Area libraries in Medicine, Law, Engineering, Physical Sciences, Divinity, Nursing and other disciplines were still largely independent. In 1969, McLennan Library opened, and Senate set up a University Libraries Commission whose Report (1971) recommended reorganization and greater coordination in the administration of the library systems.
