= Wilfred Cantwell Smith =

Canadian academic (1916–2000)

The Reverend Wilfred Cantwell Smith OC FRSC
- Born: 21 July 1916; Toronto, Ontario, Canada
- Died: 7 February 2000 (aged 83); Toronto, Ontario, Canada
- Other name: W. C. Smith
- Spouse: Muriel Struthers (m. 1939)
- Children: Arnold; Julian; Heather; Brian; Rosemary

Ecclesiastical career
- Religion: Christianity (Presbyterian)
- Church: Church of North India; United Church of Canada
- Ordained: 1944

Academic background
- Education: University of Toronto; Princeton University
- Thesis: The Azhar Journal: Analysis and Critique (1948)
- Doctoral advisor: Philip K. Hitti
- Other advisors: Sir H. A. R. Gibb; H. H. Farmer
- Influences: H. H. Farmer; John Macmurray; H. B. Sharman; Ernst Troeltsch; Gregory Vlastos

Academic work
- Discipline: Religious studies
- Sub-discipline: Comparative religion; Islamic studies
- Institutions: McGill University; Harvard University; Dalhousie University; Trinity College, Toronto
- Main interests: Religious pluralism
- Notable works: The Meaning and End of Religion (1961)
- Influenced: Diana L. Eck; Charles Taylor

Wilfred Cantwell Smith, OC FRSC (July 21, 1916 – February 7, 2000) was a Canadian Islamicist, comparative religion scholar, and Presbyterian minister. He was the founder of the Institute of Islamic Studies at McGill University in Quebec and later the director of Harvard University's Center for the Study of World Religions. The Harvard University Gazette said he was one of the field's most influential figures of the past century. In his 1962 work The Meaning and End of Religion he notably questioned the modern sectarian concept of religion.

== Early life and career ==
Smith was born on 21 July 1916 in Toronto, Ontario, to parents Victor Arnold Smith and Sarah Cory Cantwell. He was the younger brother of Arnold Smith and the father of Brian Cantwell Smith. He primarily received his secondary education at Upper Canada College.

Smith studied at University College, Toronto, receiving a Bachelor of Arts degree with honours in oriental languages circa 1938. After his thesis was rejected by the University of Cambridge, supposedly for its Marxist critique of the British Raj, he and his wife Muriel Mackenzie Struthers spent seven years in pre-independence India (1940–1946), during which he taught Indian and Islamic history at Forman Christian College in Lahore.

In 1948, he earned a PhD in Oriental Languages from Princeton University, after which he joined the faculty at McGill University. In 1952, he founded the university's Institute of Islamic Studies. During his tenure at McGill, he invited Ismail al-Faruqi to join the Institute, where al-Faruqi taught from 1958 to 1961.

From 1964 to 1973, he was a professor at Harvard Divinity School. He later moved to Dalhousie University in Halifax, Nova Scotia, where he established the Department of Religion. He was also one of the original editorial advisors for the journal Dionysius. In 1978, he returned to Harvard.

The following year, he was awarded an honorary doctorate by Concordia University.

After retiring from Harvard in 1984, he was appointed senior research associate in the Faculty of Divinity at Trinity College, University of Toronto, in 1985.

== Views on religion ==
=== Critique of "religion" as a concept ===
In The Meaning and End of Religion (1962), Smith critiqued the concept of "religion" as a systematic, identifiable entity. He argued that the term "religion" is a uniquely Western construct and not a universally valid category. Smith proposed replacing the static concept of religion with a dynamic dialectic between "cumulative tradition" (all historically observable rituals, art, music, theologies, etc.) and "personal faith".

=== Analysis of major religions ===
Smith demonstrated that founders and followers of major religions did not see themselves as part of a defined system called religion, with Islam being a notable exception. In his chapter "The Special Case of Islam", Smith noted that the term Islam appears in the Qur'an, making it the only religion named by its own tradition. He also highlighted that the Arabic language does not have a word for religion equivalent to the European concept, detailing how din, usually translated as such, differs significantly.

=== Historical evolution of the term ===
Smith pointed out that terms for major world religions like Hinduism, Buddhism, and Shintoism did not exist until the 19th century. He suggested that practitioners historically did not view their practices as "religion" until cultural self-regard prompted them to see their practices as different from others. For Smith, the modern concept of religion emerged from identity politics and apologetics.

=== Etymological study ===
Through an etymological study, Smith argued that "religion" originally denoted personal piety but evolved to mean a system of observances or beliefs, a shift institutionalized through reification. He traced this transformation from Lucretius and Cicero through Lactantius and Augustine, with the term "faith" predominating in the Middle Ages. The Renaissance revived "religio," which retained its personal practice emphasis. During the 17th-century Catholic-Protestant debates, religion began to refer to abstract systems of beliefs, a concept further reified during the Enlightenment, exemplified by G.W.F. Hegel's definition of religion as a self-subsisting transcendent idea.

=== Four distinct senses of "religion" ===
Smith concluded that "religion" now has four distinct senses: personal piety, an overt system of beliefs, practices, and values as an ideal religion, an empirical phenomenon related to a particular community's historical and sociological manifestation, and a generic summation or universal category of religion in general.

The Meaning and End of Religion remains Smith's most influential work. The anthropologist of religion and postcolonial scholar Talal Asad has called it a modern classic and a masterpiece.

== Death and legacy ==
Smith died on 7 February 2000 in Toronto. His papers are preserved in Special Collections and Archives at the University Library at California State University, Northridge.

== See also ==
- Religious pluralism
- Universalism

== Bibliography ==
- Modern Islam in India: A Social Analysis. London: Victor Gollancz. 1945.
- The Muslim League, 1942–1945. Minerva Book Shop. 1945. p. 57.
- Pakistan as an Islamic State: Preliminary Draft. Shaikh Muhammad Ashraf. 1954. p. 114.
- Islam in Modern History: The Tension Between Faith and History in the Islamic World (1977 paperback ed.). Princeton University Press. 1957.
- The Meaning and End of Religion: A New Approach to the Religious Traditions of Mankind (1991 paperback ed.). Macmillan. 1962.
- The Faith of Other Men. Dutton. 1963.
- Questions of Religious Truth. Scribner. 1967.
- Religious Diversity: Essays (paperback ed.). HarperCollins. 1976. ISBN 0-06-067464-4.
- Belief and History (1986 paperback ed.). University of Virginia Press. 1977. ISBN 0-8139-1086-2.
- On Understanding Islam: Selected Studies. The Hague: Mouton Publishers. 1981. ISBN 90-279-3448-7.
- Scripture: Issues as Seen by a Comparative Religionist. Claremont Graduate School. 1985. p. 22.
- Towards a World Theology: Faith and the Comparative History of Religion (1990 paperback ed.). Macmillan. 1989. ISBN 0-333-52272-9.
- What Is Scripture? A Comparative Approach. Fortress Press. 1993. ISBN 0-8006-2608-7.
- Patterns of Faith Around the World. Oneworld Publications. 1998. ISBN 1-85168-164-7.
- Faith and Belief (1998 Oneworld Publications ed.). Princeton University Press. 1979. ISBN 1-85168-165-5.
- Believing. Oneworld Publications. 1998. ISBN 1-85168-166-3.
- Kenneth Cracknell, ed. (2001). Wilfred Cantwell Smith Reader. Oneworld Publications. ISBN 1-85168-249-X.
- Michel Despland and Gerard Vallée, ed. (1992). "Religion in History: The Word, the Idea, the Reality". Wilfred Cantwell Smith. A Chronological Bibliography. Wilfrid Laurier University Press. pp. 243–252.

== Of interest ==
- Bae, Kuk-Won (2003). Homo Fidei: A Critical Understanding of Faith in the Writings of Wilfred Cantwell Smith and Its Implications for the Study of Religion. New York: Peter Lang. ISBN 978-0-8204-5112-1.
- Gilkey, Langdon (1981). "A Theological Voyage with Wilfred Cantwell Smith". Religious Studies Review. 7 (4): 298–306. doi:10.1111/j.1748-0922.1981.tb00185.x. ISSN 1748-0922.
- Hughes, Edward J. (1986). Wilfred Cantwell Smith: A Theology for the World. London: SCM Press. ISBN 978-0-334-02333-3.
- Mæland, Bård (2003). Rewarding Encounters: Islam and the Comparative Theologies of Kenneth Cragg and Wilfred Cantwell Smith. London: Melisende. ISBN 978-1-901764-24-6.

Professional and academic associations
Preceded by Gordon D. Kaufman	President of the American Academy of Religion; 1983	Succeeded by Ray Hart
