= RBSC =

RBSC may refer to:

- Rare Books and Special Collections Library, a department of McGill University Library in Canada
- Richmond Baseball and Softball Club, a sports club in England
- Rose Bay Secondary College, a secondary school in Australia
- Royal Bangkok Sports Club, an exclusive sports club in Thailand
