= McLennan Library Building =

Library building of McGill University in Montreal, Canada

Coordinates: 45.5033°N 73.5760°W

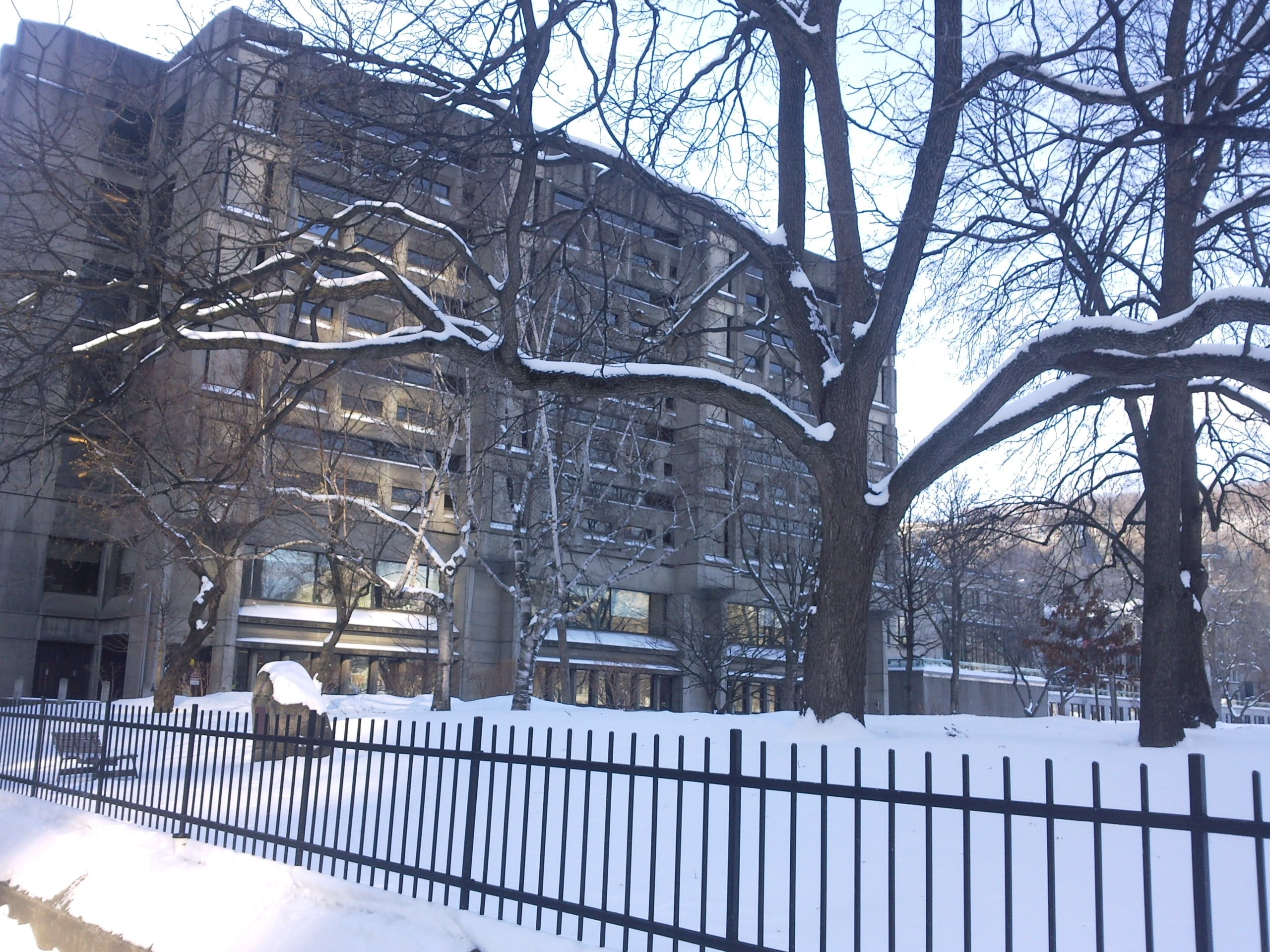
Exterior of the building in 2016

The McLennan Library Building is a major library building of McGill University in Montreal, Quebec, Canada. It is located at 3459 rue McTavish (McTavish Street), at the northeast corner of rue Sherbrooke (Sherbrooke Street) and McTavish. The building, along with the adjacent Redpath Library Building, currently houses the Humanities and Social Sciences Library, the largest branch of the McGill University Library.

== History ==
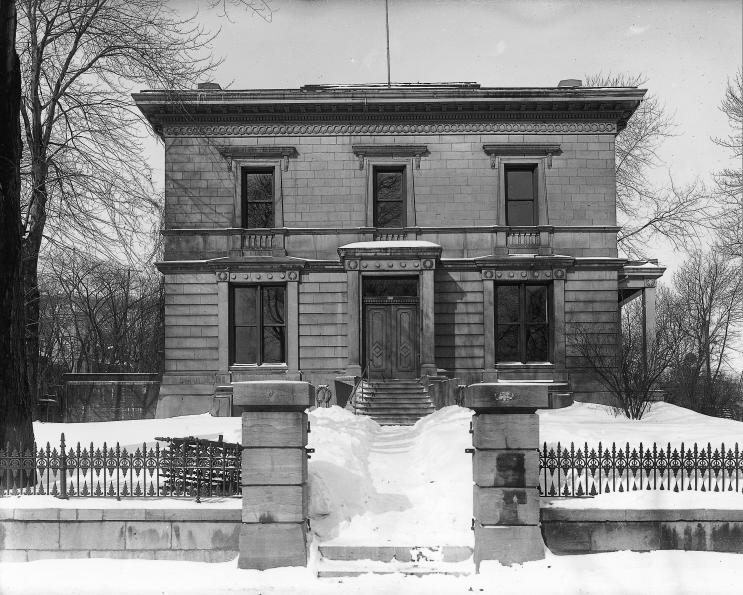
Dilcoosha in 1913

The McLennan Library Building stands on the site of Jesse Joseph's former mansion, named Dilcoosha, in the Golden Square Mile. Joseph was a prominent Montreal businessman, philanthropist and member of the city's Jewish community, and he died in 1904. The mansion later served as a Canadian Officers' Training Corps headquarters during World War I and afterwards as the first home of the McCord Museum. The mansion was demolished in 1955.

The current seven-storey reinforced concrete structure was built between 1967 and 1969. It was designed in the Brutalist style by the firm of Dobush, Stewart and Bourke, who designed McGill's Stewart Biological Sciences Building and Ernest Rutherford Physics Building. The firm also worked on designing the city's Cadillac Metro station.

The exterior consists of identical precast concrete panels that are attached to a reinforced concrete frame. It is attached to the adjacent Redpath Library Building by a bridge walkway.

The main entrance to the McLennan library is now at the south end of the concrete terrace, on account of the Redpath library's entrance being closed after the terrace renovations ended in January 2014, due to a lack of funding by McGill's administration. All traffic between floors is controlled by the central stairwell and elevator core.

The sixth floor houses the McGill University Archives, and the fourth floor is dedicated to McGill's Rare Books and Special Collections. The library building was named in honour of Isabella McLennan, who had made a large donation to McGill in order to purchase books.

== Rare Books and Special Collections ==
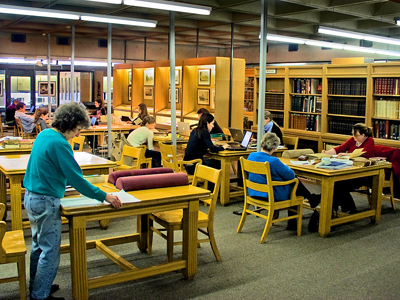
This 20-seat work space is located inside the Rare Book Collection

The Rare Book Collection is located on the fourth floor of Mclennan Library. McGill began collecting rare materials in the 1850s, and now constituting rich and highly diverse research collections. These collections are used to aid teaching, learning and research for McGill students and the general public from all fields of study. The books held in the collection cover disciplines of Canadian literature, history of ideas, arts and architecture, history, and travel. Critical scientific holdings can be found in both the general and special collections. The Rare Book Collections of the Blackader-Lauterman, the Blacker-Wood, Islamic Studies and Macdonald Campus libraries are housed with the general rare book collection. Collection development is focused on all aspects of Canadiana including literature, history, maps, travel and popular culture; on philosophy and in particular David Hume and the late 17th and 18th centuries; on English and French literature of the 18th c. with an emphasis on the circle of Fanny Burney; and on book history including printing history, type specimen books and significant examples of printing.

== Food services ==
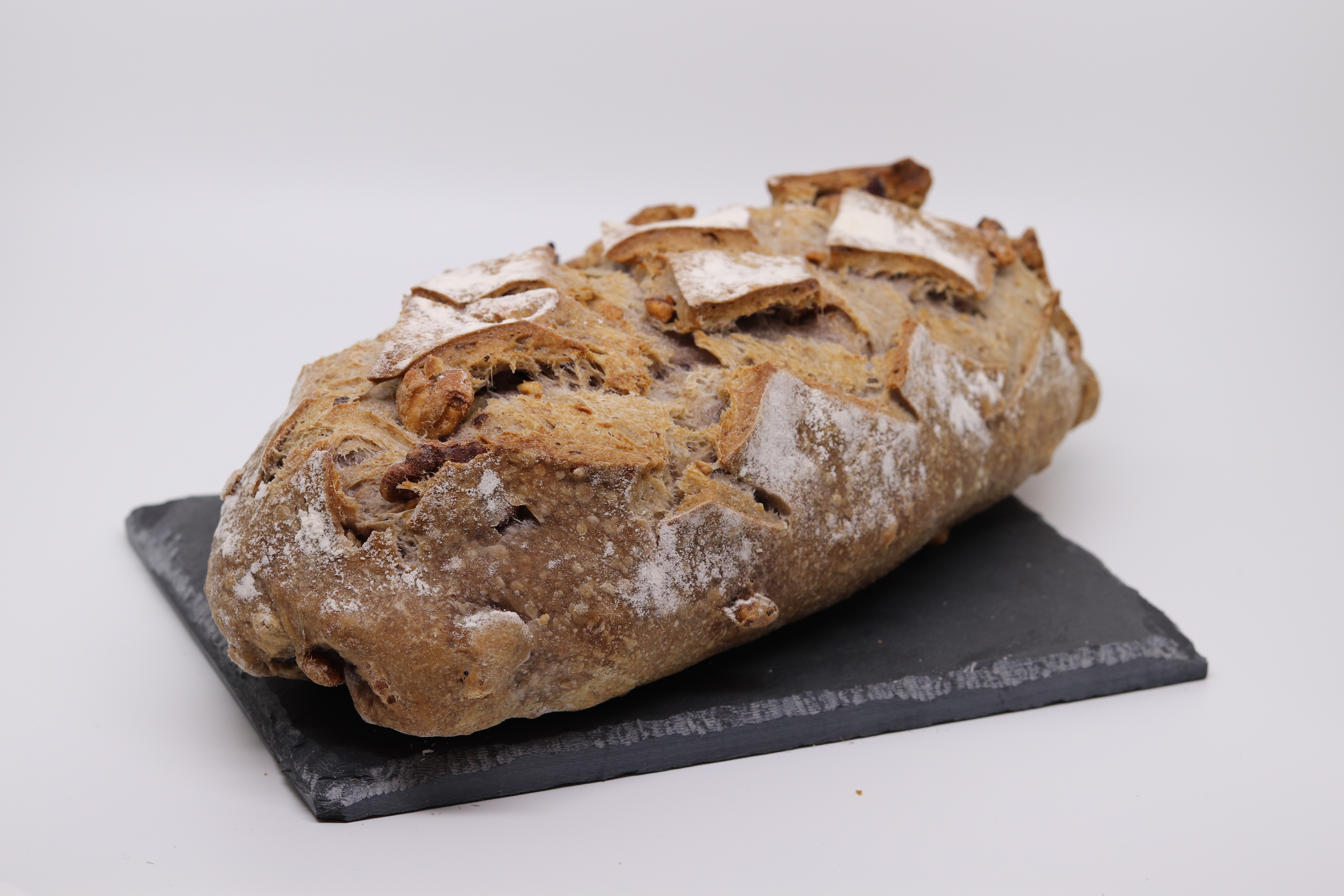
Bread from Première Moisson

Première Moisson, a chain of artisanal bakeries in Quebec, was located in the basement of McLennan Library until the end of the 2018/19 school year. For the 2019/20 school year, Bento Sushi moved in, offering poke bowls and sushi, while the cafe that operated alongside Premiere Moisson continues to offer coffee, baked goods, and other snacks and packaged meals similar to those offered in the McGill dining halls.

== Wellness-focused spaces ==
McLennan Tranquility-Zone

The Arts Undergraduate Improvement Fund supported the creation of the McLennan Library's new relaxing work space. The new space is located on the 6th floor of the McLennan Library building and was designed with the user preferences in mind. The tranquility zone is aimed to foster a conductive learning yet relaxing environment. The space was designed to differ from other conventional study spaces throughout the library; it encompasses reclining lounge chairs, square side tables, and multiple exercise balls to create a calm environment. The centre of the tranquility zone showcases a Zen Garden which contains stress relieving activities for students to engage with in between periods of work. The work space, like all most spaces in the McLennan building, is a quiet zone to ensure productive and no disruptive environment.

Spin Bike Garden

The Spin Bike Garden (SBG) is a project with aim of bringing mental health and wellbeing to McGill. The project has equipped the McLennan Library / Redpath Library 1st floor (group study area) with two silent spin bikes surrounded by plants and meditative art. The Spin Bike Garden provides a space for students to engage in mental and physical breaks while studying; this is proven to help reduce overall stress while boosting energy levels and mental wellness. The spin Garden is a space for everybody, no biking experience is required.

== See also ==
- McGill University Archives
