= Andrew Taylor (architect) =

British architect and councillor (1850-1937)

Sir Andrew Thomas Taylor
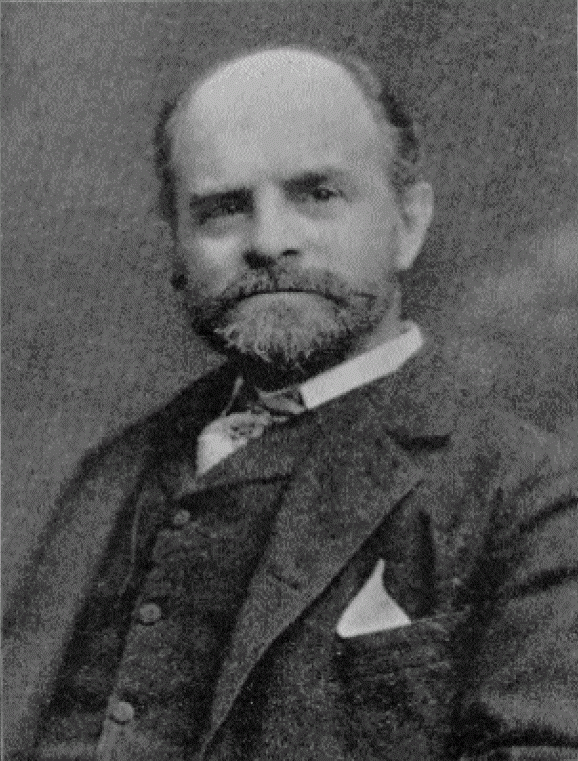
- Sir Andrew Thomas Taylor, c. 1900
- Born: 13 October 1850; Edinburgh, Scotland
- Died: 5 December 1937 (aged 87); London, England
- Resting place: Highgate Cemetery
- Occupation: Architect
- Practice: Taylor, Gordon and Bousfield, and Taylor and Gordon
- Buildings: Osler Library, Redpath Library

Sir Andrew Thomas Taylor, JP, RCA, FSA, FRIBA (13 October 1850 – 5 December 1937) was a British architect and councillor. He was born in Edinburgh, Scotland, and practised architecture in Scotland and London before emigrating to Montreal, Quebec, in 1883, where he designed many of the buildings of McGill University. He retired from architecture in 1904 and returned to London, where he served on London County Council from 1908 to 1926. He was knighted for his political services in 1926.

== Biography ==
Taylor was the son of James Taylor, a publisher, and Agnes Drummond, the sister of Sir George Drummond, of Montreal. In 1864 he began his architectural training as an articled apprentice to Pilkington & Bell in Edinburgh, staying for five years. He worked for a year as architect in the Duke of Roxburghe's estate office, and then moved to Aberdeen where he worked in the office of William Smith.

=== Architectural practice in London ===
He left Scotland for London in 1872, taking a position at the office of Joseph Clarke, and studying at the Royal Academy Schools and University College London. His essay on London's 16th-century architecture won a Royal Institute of British Architects (RIBA) silver medal in 1874. In 1877 he travelled to Italy and France. He joined the RIBA in 1878. An essay on the work of Sir Christopher Wren gained him a second RIBA medal in 1881. He subsequently published a book on the subject: The Towers and Steeples designed by Sir Christopher Wren, a descriptive, historical and critical essay.

In 1879 he established his own architectural practice in London, with a design for a Memorial Hall and Schools at Dover being his first commission (completed 1881, since demolished). Together with Henry Hall, another of Pilkington's former pupils, Taylor entered the competition to design Glasgow City Chambers, being placed second. In 1882 Taylor established a partnership with George William Hamilton Gordon.

=== Montreal ===
In 1883, Taylor and Gordon opened an office in Montreal, where Taylor's uncle George Drummond was an influential figure. Taylor moved to Canada, while Gordon stayed in London. However, the partnership was dissolved in 1888. In Canada, Taylor worked with the architect R.W.G. Bousfield.

Taylor was responsible for buildings on the campus of McGill University including the School of Architecture's Macdonald-Harrington Building (1896), Macdonald Physics Building (1893), the Redpath Library (1893), the Macdonald Engineering Building (1907), and the Memorial Arch for King George V (1901). He designed the Montreal Diocesan Theological College building on University Street near Milton Street (1895–96), which is also now part of McGill University.

When Ravenscrag, now the Allan Memorial Institute, was still the residence of Sir Hugh Allan, Taylor extended the east wing (1889), and enlarged the stables (1898). Taylor performed alterations and restoration on the Christ Church Cathedral from 1890 to 1891, and installed a memorial window for Mrs. A.C. Hooper, 1902–03. He designed the Mount Royal Crematory (1901), the first crematory in Canada, on the eastern side of the Mount Royal Cemetery. In 1885, he designed and built Francis Redpath's house in Montreal, which from 1986 was under threat of demolition from the Sochaczevski family until final demolition in 2014 (refer to the relevant paragraph within the Golden Square Mile). He was elected to the Royal Canadian Academy of Arts.

Taylor was the architect responsible for the buildings and renovation of several buildings for the Bank of Montreal:

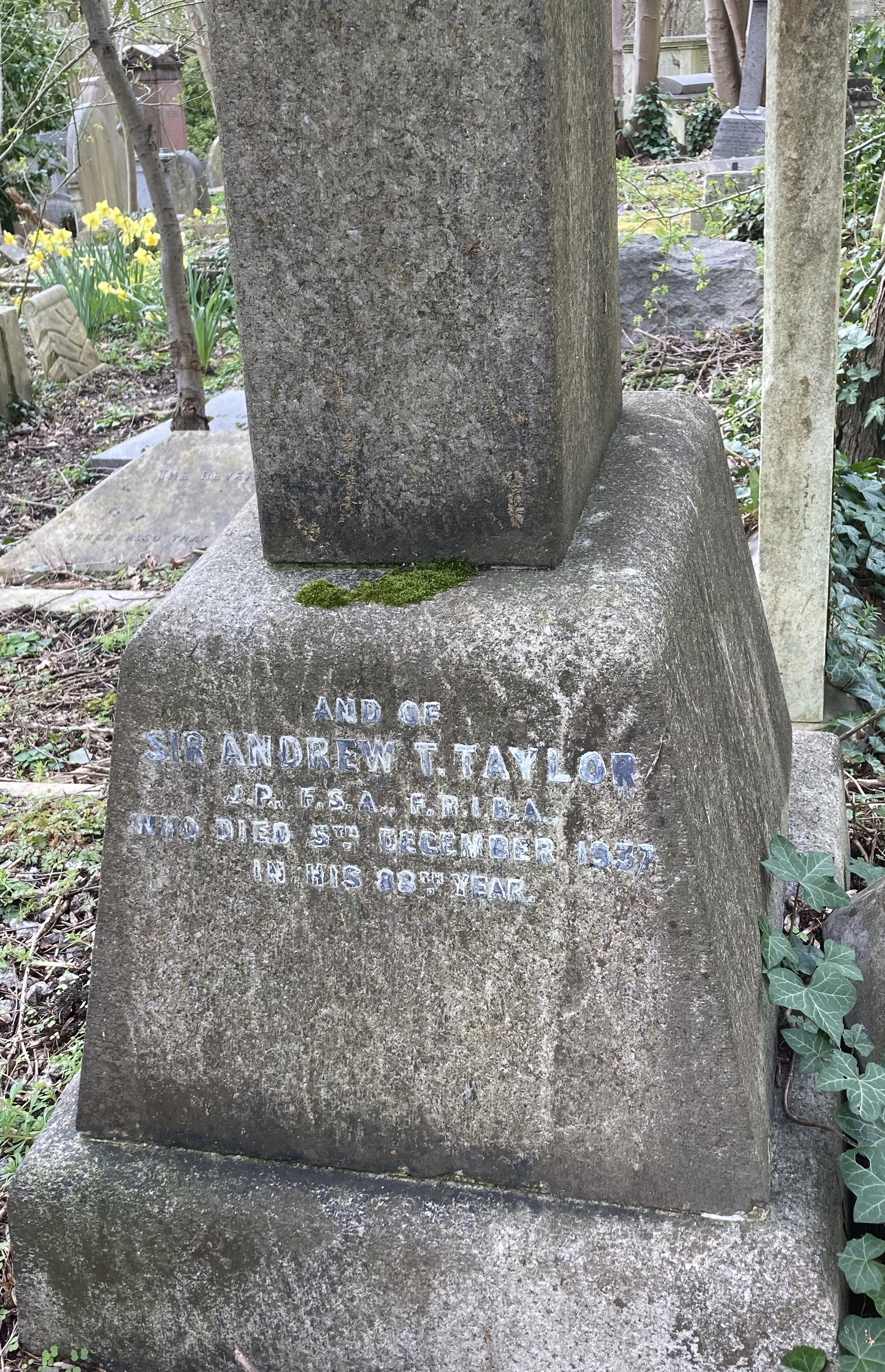
Grave of Sir Andrew Taylor in Highgate Cemetery

- The Bank of Montreal in Waterloo, Ontario, formerly known as the Molson's Bank, (1914)
- The Bank of Montreal in Point St. Charles Branch, Wellington Street at Magdalen Street, Montreal, Quebec (1901)
- The Bank of Montreal in West End, Ste. Catherine Street West at Mansfield Street, Montreal (1889)
- The Bank of Montreal in Notre Dame Street West Seigneurs Street, Montreal (1894)
- The Bank of Montreal, St. Catherine Street West at Papineau Street, Montreal (1904)
- The Bank of Montreal, Perth, Ontario (1884)
- The Bank of Montreal, Stephen Avenue at Scarth Street, Calgary, Alberta (1888)
- The Bank of Montreal, Sydney, Nova Scotia (1901)
- Manager's residence for the Bank of Montreal, Grande Allee, Quebec City (1904)

=== Political career ===
Taylor retired from architecture in 1904, returning to London, England. He pursued a political career as a Conservative Party municipal councillor. He was elected to London County Council on 24 October 1908, representing Hampstead, and served until 1926. From 1911 to 1937 he also served as Chair of the Architectural Education Committee and Chair of the Slade Committee at University College London. In the 1926 Birthday Honours he was knighted for his political work.

He died on 5 December 1937 and is buried on the east side of Highgate Cemetery.

=== Legacy ===
Under his will, the Sir Andrew Taylor Prize in Fine Art and the Sir Andrew Taylor Prize in Architecture were founded at University College London.

== Works ==
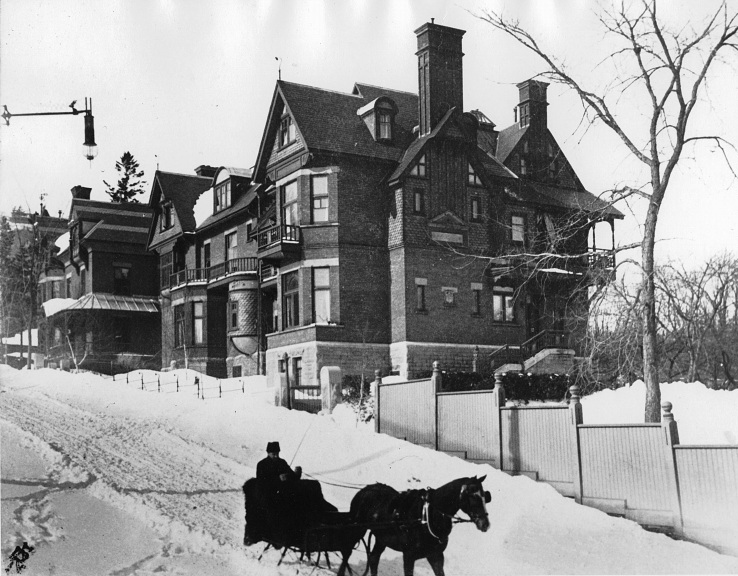
Frederick Redpath House in the Golden Square Mile was designed and built in 1885. After a 28-year battle, it was demolished in 2014 in favour of a condominium block by the Sochacevski family.

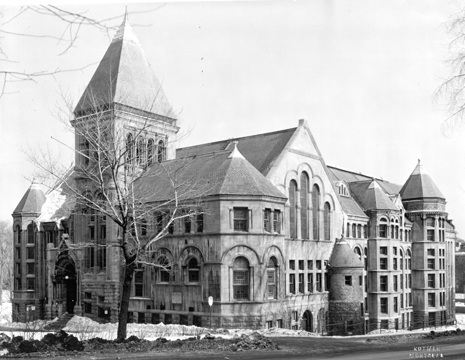
Redpath Library Building, (1893) Romanesque style, McGill University

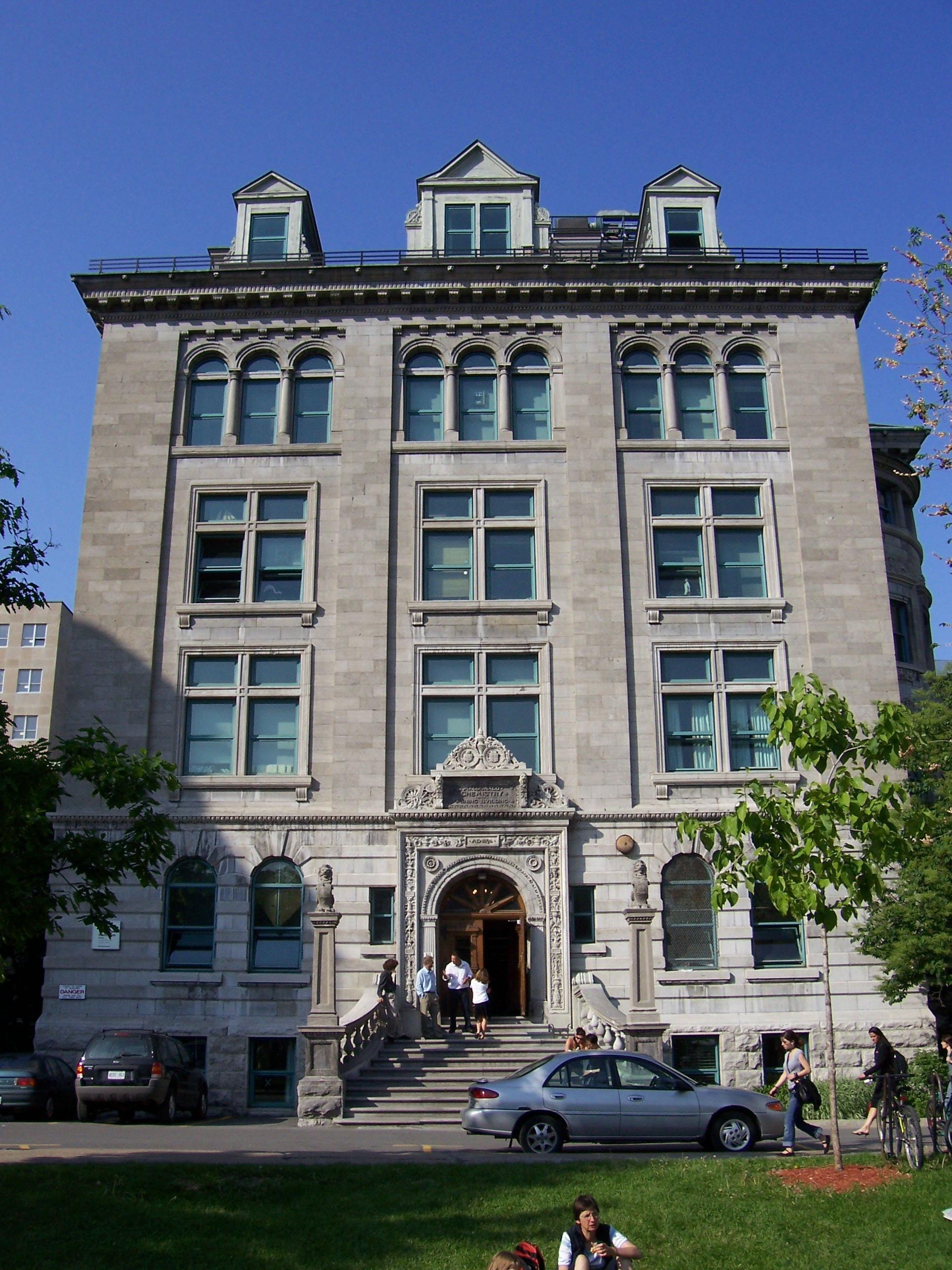
The Macdonald-Harrington Building (1896), Renaissance Revival style, McGill University

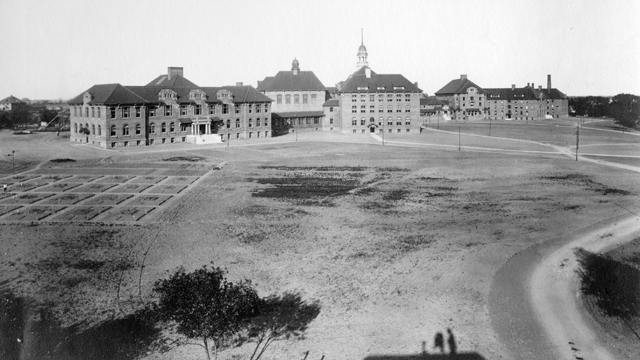
Macdonald Physics Building (1893); Macdonald Engineering Building (1907), Assembly Hall (1906) Strathcona Medical Building (1907), at Macdonald Campus, McGill University

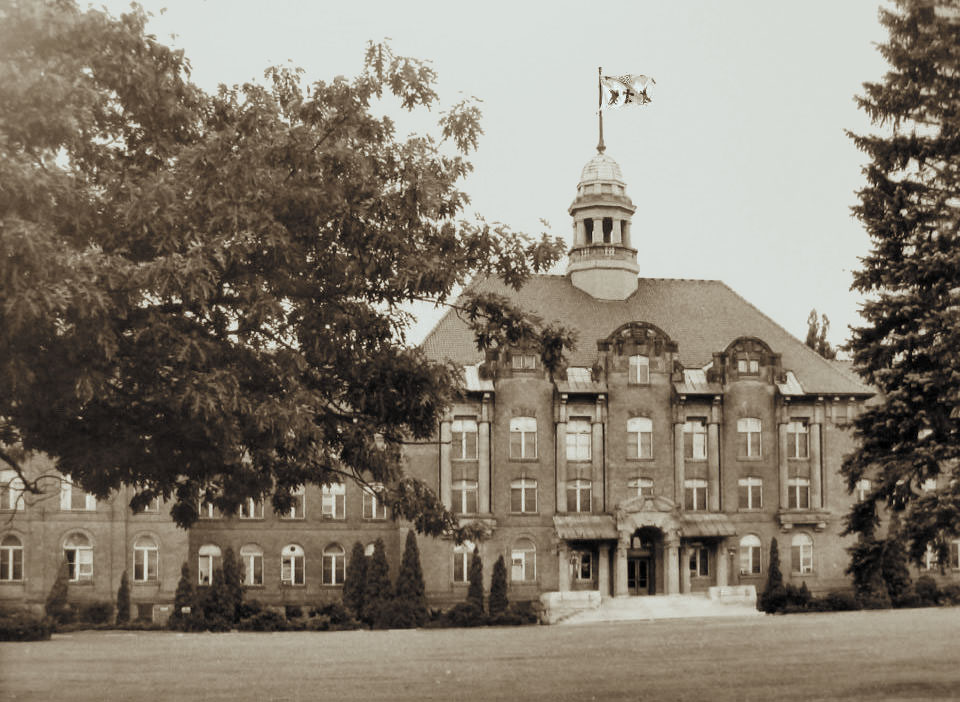
Administration Building, Macdonald Campus, McGill University

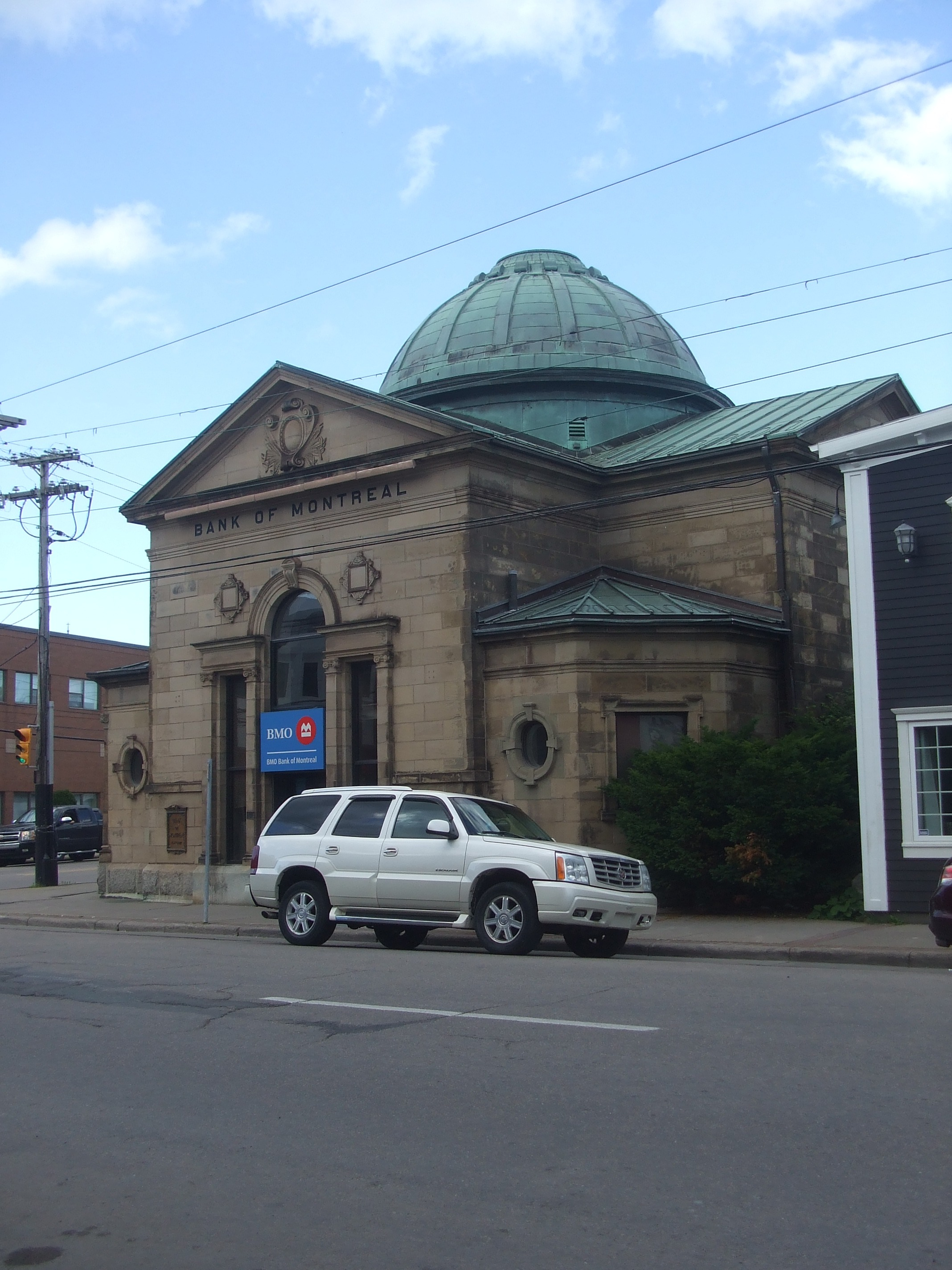
Bank of Montreal Building (1901), Sydney, Nova Scotia; designated by the Cape Breton Regional Municipality as a registered heritage property in 2008

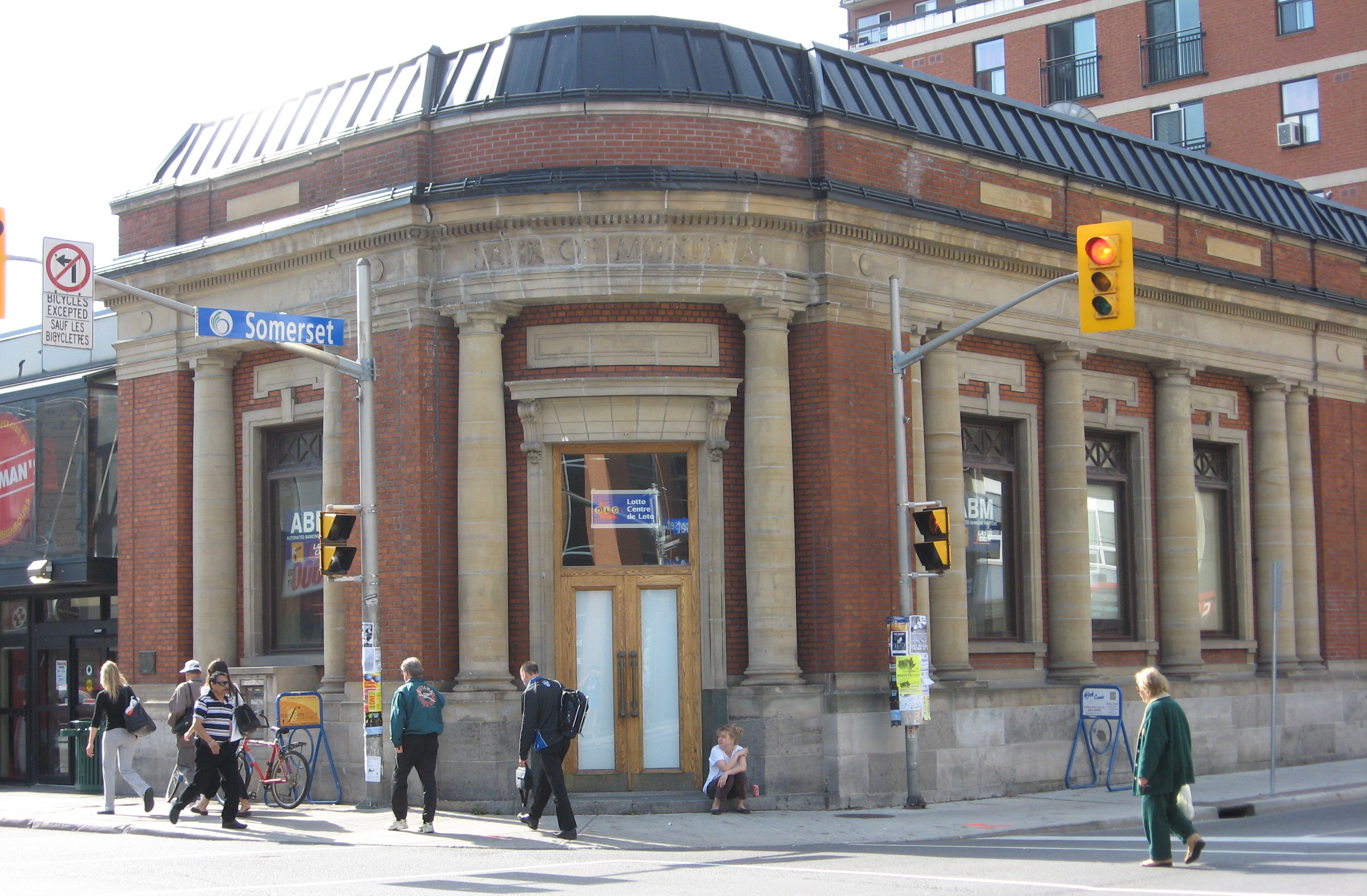
Former Bank of Montreal on Somerset Street, a designated heritage property in Ottawa

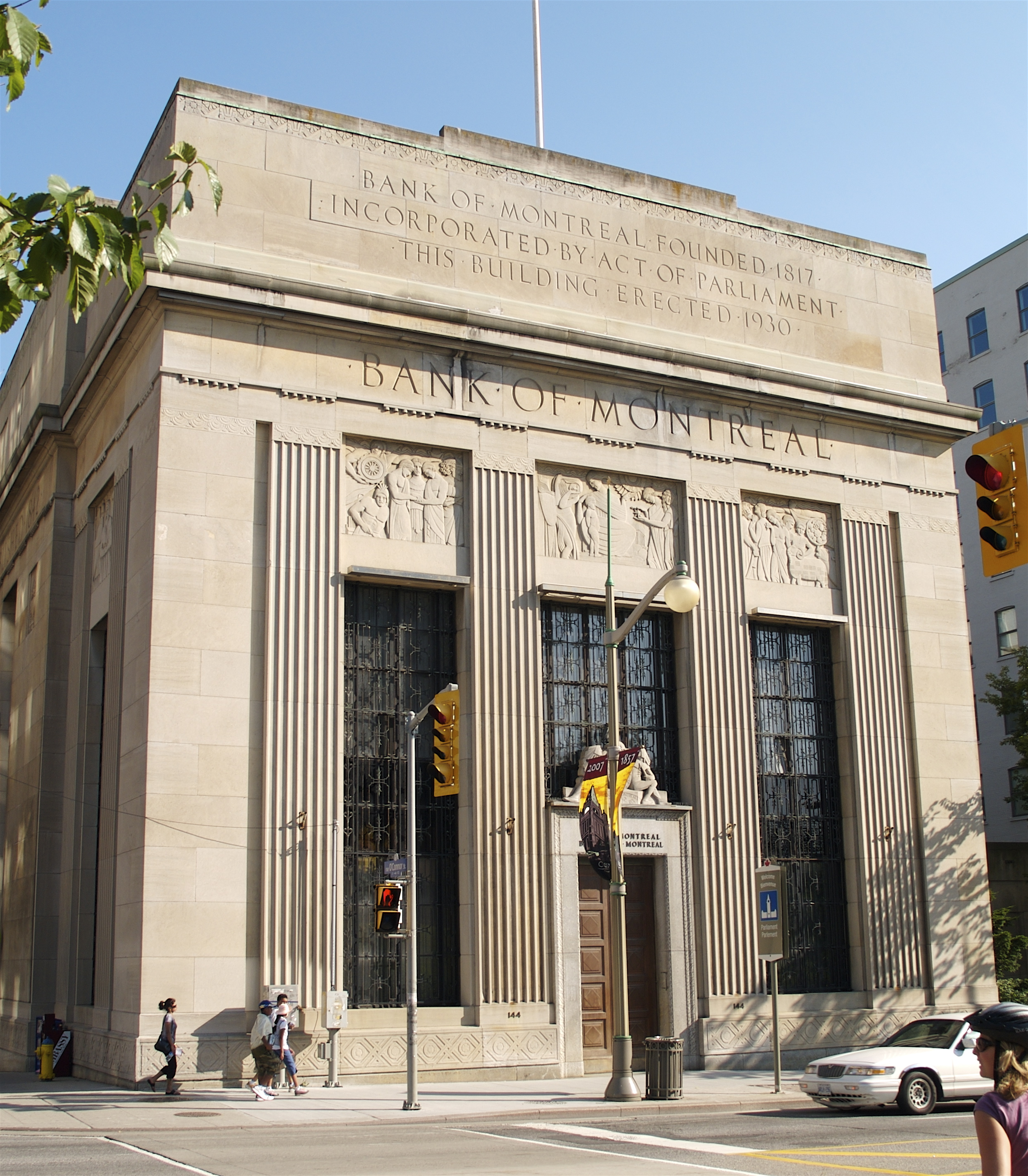
Bank of Montreal, Wellington Street, Ottawa (1930–32)

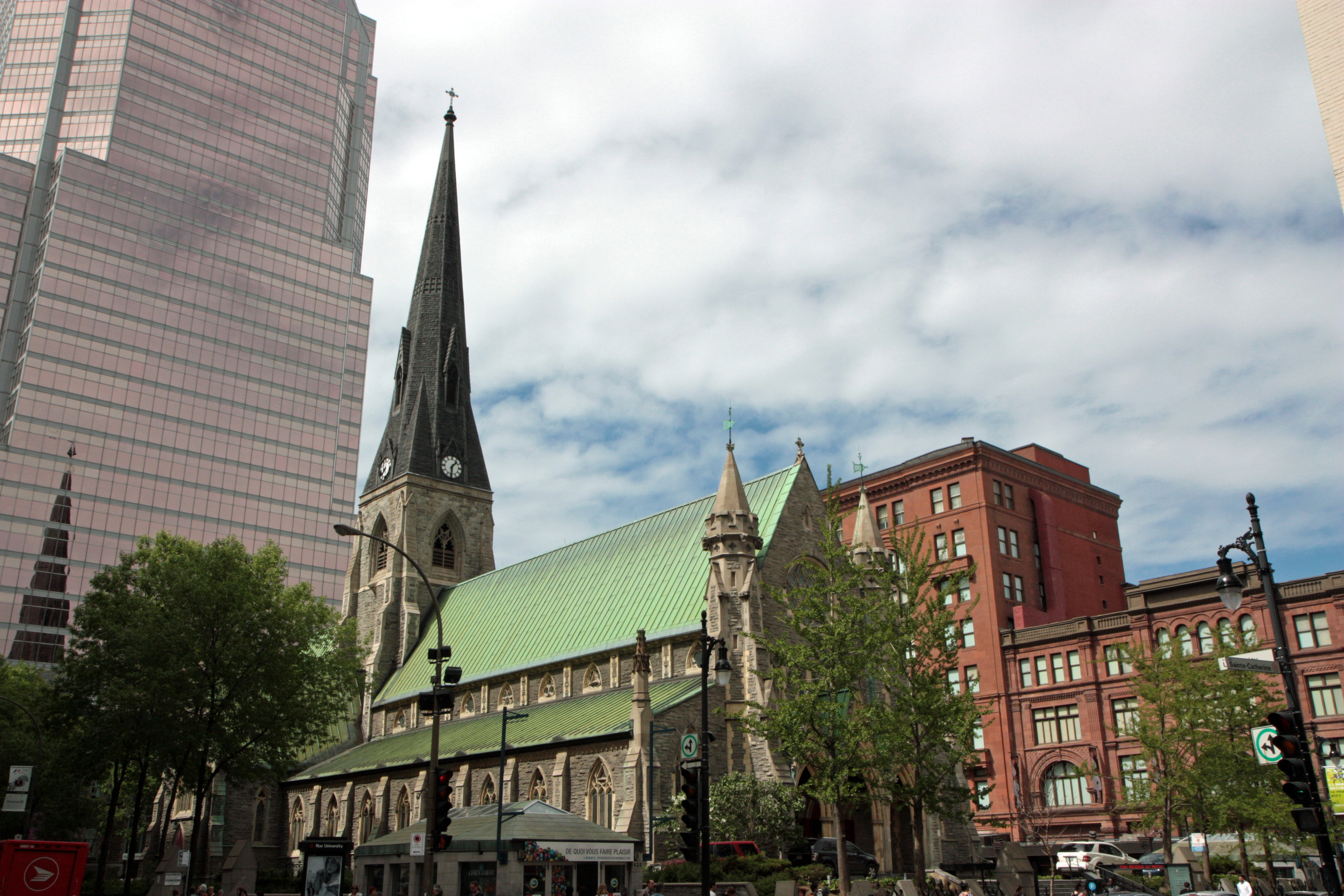
Christ Church Cathedral, Montreal (renovations from 1890 to 1891)

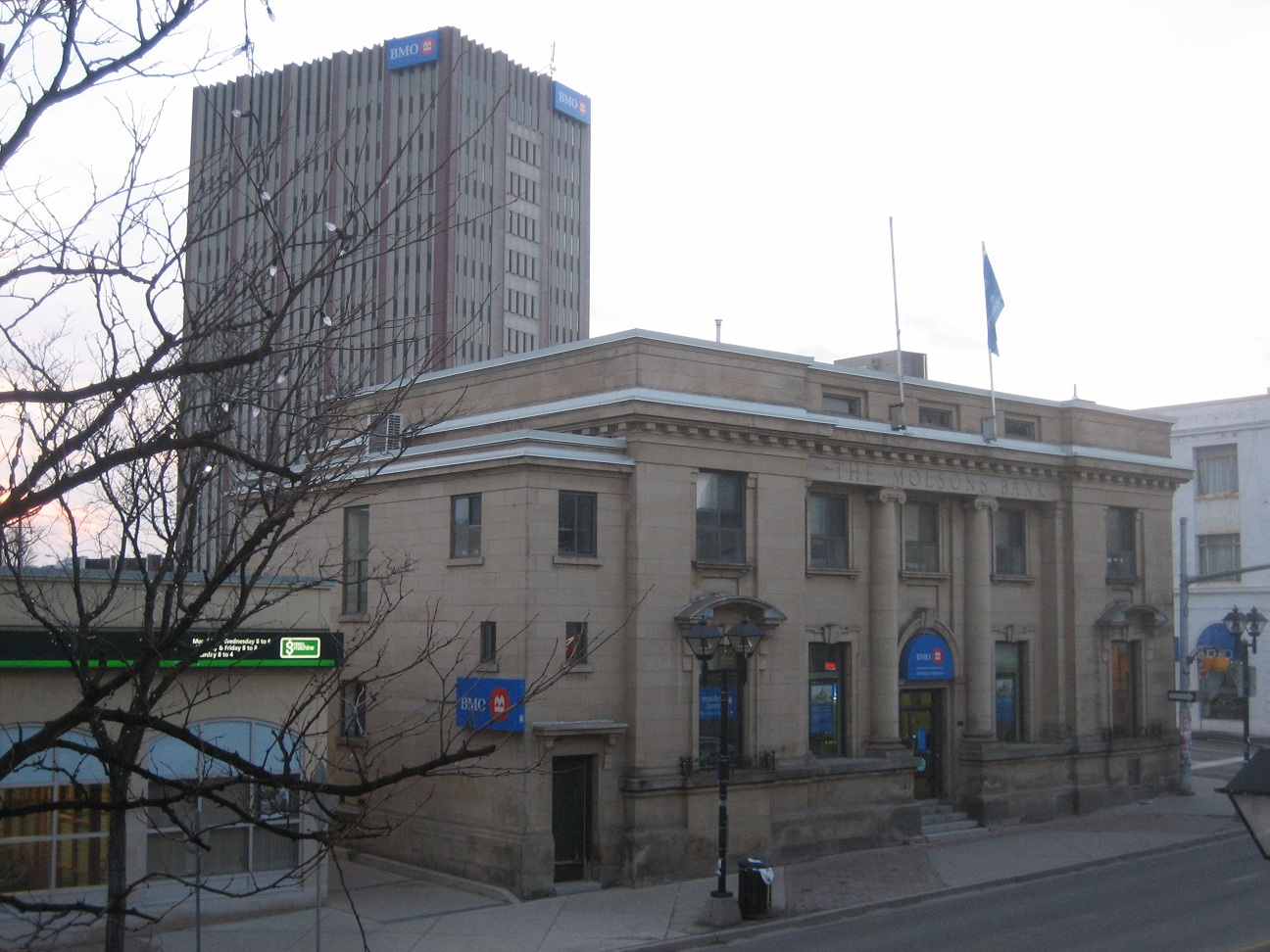
Molsons Bank Building (BMO Branch), Waterloo, Ontario

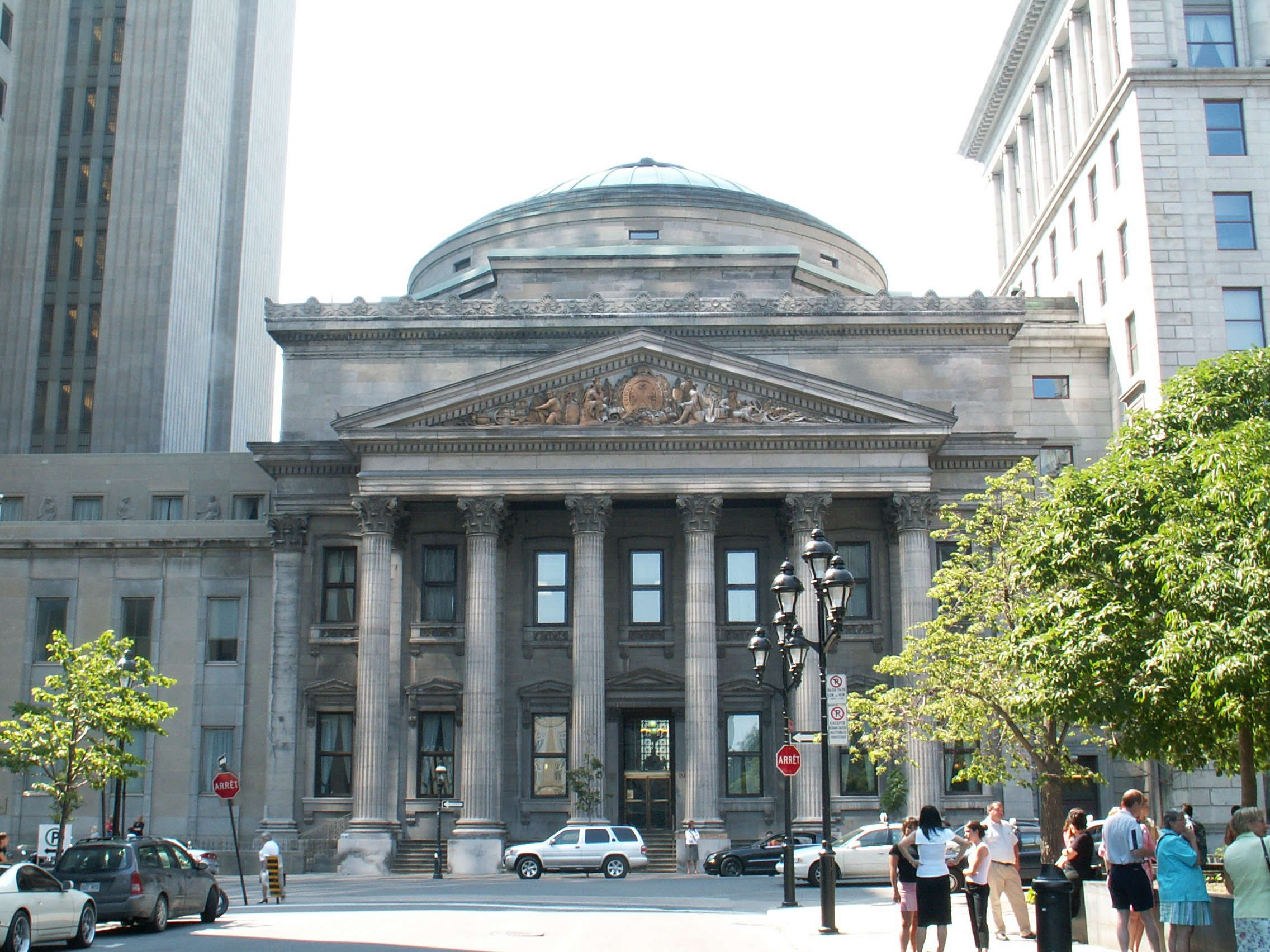
The Bank of Montreal on Place d'Armes (1900), designed with the New York firm of McKim, Mead and White

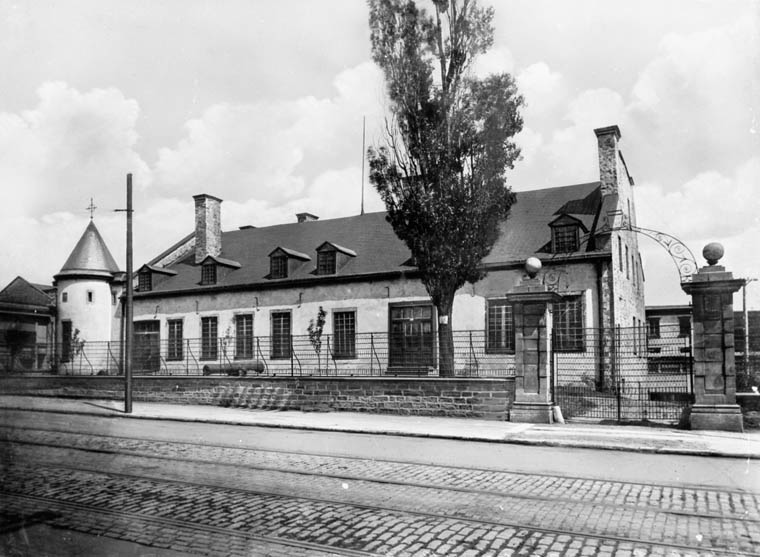
Sir Andrew Taylor designed alterations to Château Ramezay, Montreal, in 1895

== See also ==
- List of members of London County Council 1889–1919
