= Brian Cantwell Smith =

Canadian-American philosopher (1950–2025)

- Born: November 29, 1950; Montreal, Quebec, Canada
- Died: September 6, 2025 (aged 74); Toronto, Ontario, Canada
- Education: Massachusetts Institute of Technology; Oberlin College
- Known for: Computational reflection
- Scientific career
- Fields: Cognitive science; computer science; philosophy; information science
- Workplaces: University of Toronto; Duke University; Indiana University; Xerox Palo Alto Research Center; Stanford University
- Thesis: Procedural Reflection in Programming Languages; Volume 1 (1982)
- Doctoral advisor: Peter Szolovits

Brian Cantwell Smith (November 29, 1950 – September 6, 2025) was a Canadian-American philosopher and cognitive scientist whose work spanned cognitive science, computer science, information science, and philosophy. He is known for introducing the concept of reflective programming (computational reflection) in programming languages, and for influential contributions to the philosophy of computing, ontology, epistemology, and the foundations of artificial intelligence.

Smith was a founder of the Center for the Study of Language and Information at Stanford University, and the first president of Computer Professionals for Social Responsibility. Smith served as principal scientist at the Xerox Palo Alto Research Center in the 1980s and later held faculty positions at Indiana University, Duke University, and the University of Toronto, where he was Dean of the Faculty of Information from 2003 to 2008 and later held the Reid Hoffman Chair in Artificial Intelligence and the Human.

== Career ==
Smith studied at Oberlin College before completing his BS, MS and PhD degrees at the Massachusetts Institute of Technology. His 1982 doctoral dissertation introduced the notion of computational reflection in programming languages, an area of ongoing research in computer science.

He was a founder of the Center for the Study of Language and Information at Stanford University and first president of Computer Professionals for Social Responsibility. His 1989 Stanford course, Philosophy of Artificial Intelligence, inspired Reid Hoffman, later co-founder of LinkedIn.

Smith later taught at Indiana University and Duke University before joining the University of Toronto in 2003 as Canada Research Chair in the Foundations of Information. From 2003 to 2008 he was Dean of the Faculty of Information, where he helped transform the Faculty into an interdisciplinary centre. He retired in August 2025. A Festschrift in his honour is planned for 2026.

== Personal life and death ==
Smith was the son of religious studies scholar Wilfred Cantwell Smith and Muriel Smith. He spent his childhood in Canada, India, and the United States. He was married to Gillian Einstein, a faculty member in the Department of Psychology at the University of Toronto.

Outside academia, Smith was an avid canoeist and outdoorsman, and later co-stewarded a lodge on Georgian Bay. He was also passionate about music, especially bluegrass and chamber music.

Smith died at Sunnybrook Hospital in Toronto, on September 6, 2025, shortly after his retirement. He was 74. A memorial fund in his honour was established at Project Canoe.

== Books ==
- Procedural Reflection in Programming Languages, Ph.D. dissertation, MIT, 1982.
- On the Origin of Objects, MIT Press, 1998. ISBN 9780262193634
- The Promise of Artificial Intelligence: Reckoning and Judgment, MIT Press, 2019. ISBN 9780262043045
- Computational Reflections, MIT Press, 2026 (posthumous).
