= Bank of Montreal Building (Sydney, Nova Scotia) =

Historic building in Sydney, Nova Scotia

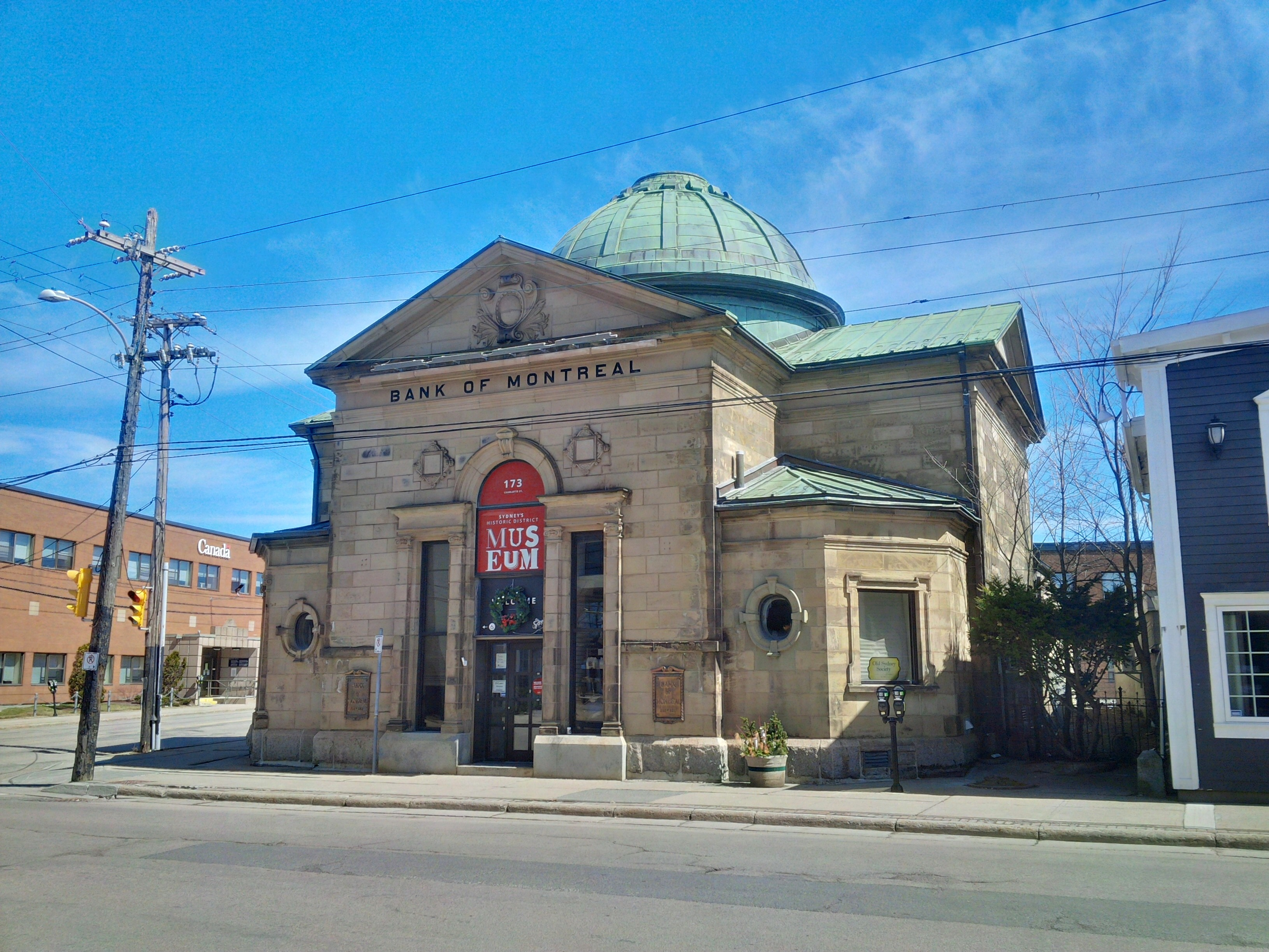
- Bank of Montreal Building, Sydney, Nova Scotia
- Interactive map of the Bank of Montreal Building area

General information
- Status: Museum
- Architectural style: Neoclassical
- Location: 175 Charlotte Street, Sydney, Nova Scotia, Canada
- Coordinates: 46.1409°N 60.1953°W
- Current tenants: Old Sydney Society
- Completed: 1901
- Renovated: 2017
- Renovation cost: $350,000

Design and construction
- Architect: Sir Andrew Thomas Taylor
- Main contractor: James Reid

Nova Scotia Heritage Property Act
- Type: Municipally Registered Property
- Designated: January 15, 2008
- Reference no.: 07MNS2256

The Bank of Montreal Building is a former Bank of Montreal branch and a current museum in Sydney, Nova Scotia. It is located at the corner of Charlotte and Dorchester Streets. The building, completed in 1901, was designed by architect Sir Andrew Thomas Taylor, who also designed many buildings at McGill University.

In 2016, the building was donated to the Old Sydney Society, who converted the bank into a museum.
