= Redpath Hall =

Building of McGill University

Coordinates: 45.503757°N 73.576952°W

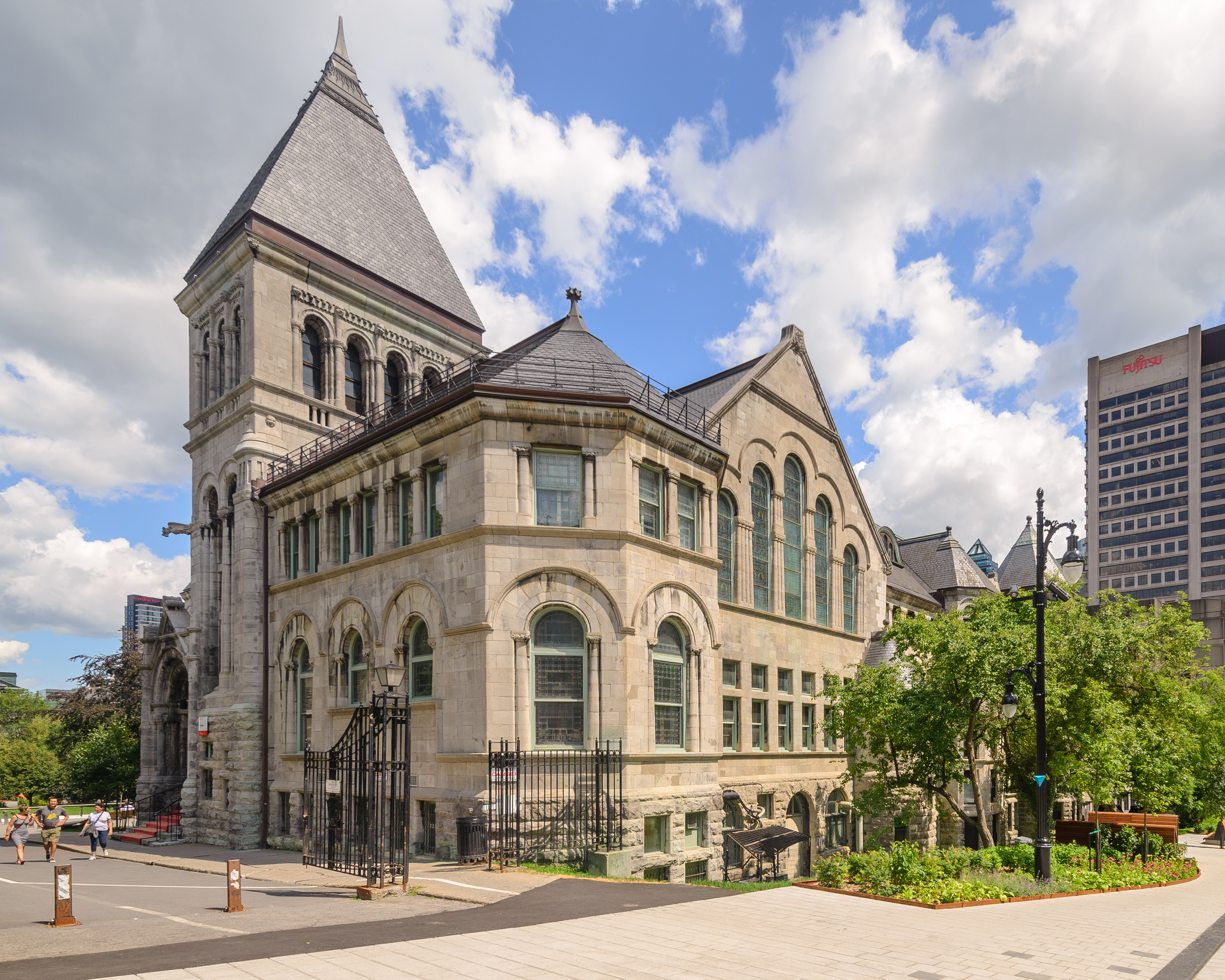
- Interactive map of the Redpath Hall area

General information
- Architectural style: Richardsonian Romanesque
- Location: Montreal, Quebec, Canada
- Completed: 1893

Design and construction
- Architect: Andrew Taylor

Redpath Hall is a historic building at 3461 McTavish Street in Montreal, Quebec, Canada, on the main campus of McGill University. It was originally the reading room of the Redpath Library, which opened in 1893 as McGill's first dedicated library building. During the first half of the 20th century, the library was extended several times to the south, and the expanded building became known as the Redpath Library Building. Subsequently, the adjacent McLennan Library Building was built between 1967 and 1969. Today, the Redpath-McLennan library complex houses the Humanities and Social Sciences Library, the largest branch of the McGill University Library.

Redpath Hall is now used as a venue for concerts and other events, and it is operated by the Schulich School of Music. The French Classical pipe organ was built by Hellmuth Wolff and donated in 1981. Redpath Hall is also home to a large portion of the university's portrait collection, which is managed by the McGill Visual Arts Collection.

== History ==
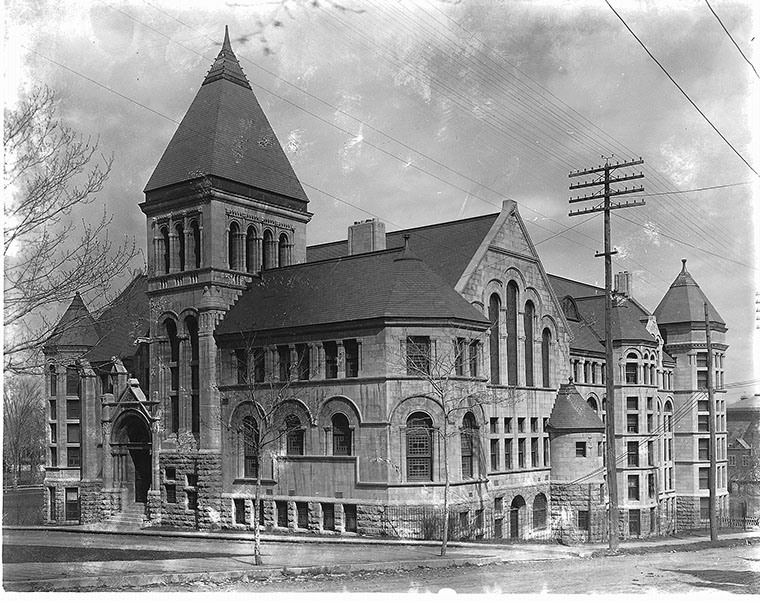
Exterior of the Redpath Library

The original library building was completed in 1893 and donated by Peter Redpath, who also founded the Redpath Museum at the university. It was designed in the Romanesque style by Andrew Taylor of Edinburgh, Scotland. The building incorporates much ornamentation. There are gargoyles and other figures on the roof, including two representing Redpath and Taylor.

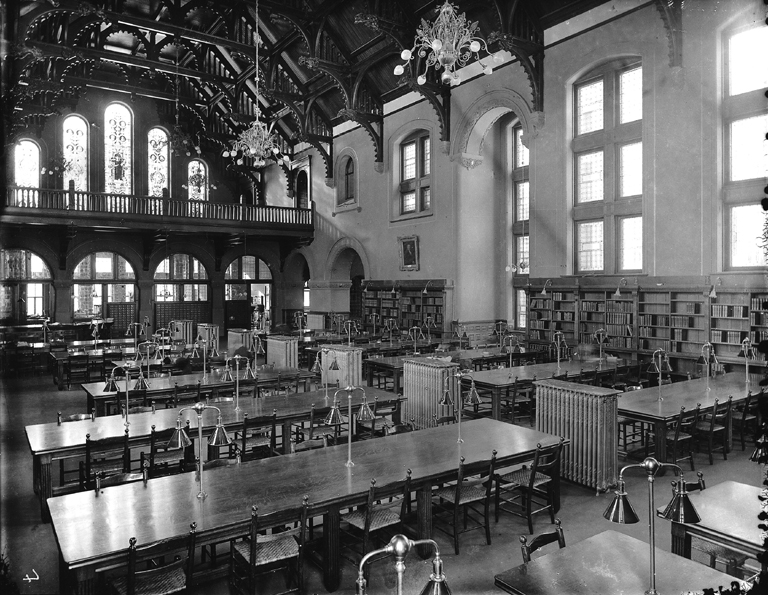
View of the Redpath Library's original reading room, which is now known as Redpath Hall

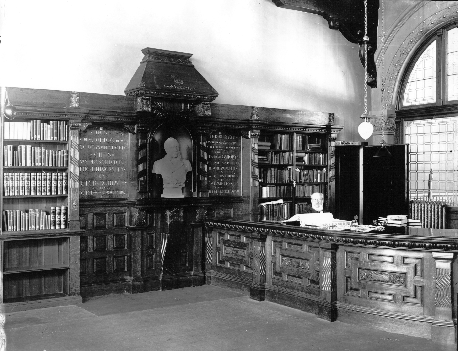
A librarian seated at Redpath Library's circulation desk in 1895.

The library stacks were expanded in 1900–01 by Taylor at the request of Redpath's wife, Grace. The library was expanded again in 1921, by Percy Erskine Nobbs and George Taylor Hyde, in the original Taylor style.

In 1952, the building was extended to the south by the architectural firm of McDougall, Fleming and Smith, and new reading areas were added. With this expansion, the east wall of the 1921 Nobbs building was enclosed, and the use of Redpath Hall as the reading room of the library came to an end. This expansion is now known as the Redpath Library Building, and it is part of the Humanities and Social Sciences Library. When the McLennan Library Building was completed in 1969, it was connected to the Redpath Library Building by a walkway between the two buildings on the main floor.

Redpath Hall is currently used as a concert hall and for special events. It has been under the management of McGill's Faculty of Music since June 1, 1986.

In 2019, a major interior renovation project began development, with projected additions including an interactive digital display near the main entrance and a more integrated heating system. The project was funded in part by an anonymous McGill alumnus.
