= Herbert Henry Farmer =

Presbyterian minister and theologian (1892–1981)

Herbert Henry Farmer (27 November 1892 – 13 January 1981) was a British Presbyterian minister, philosopher of religion, and academic. Having served in pastoral ministry from 1919 to 1931, he moved into academia as a member of the staff of Hartford Seminary in the United States. After four years, he returned to England where he had been appointed Barbour Professor of Systematic Theology at Westminster College, Cambridge in 1935. He was additionally the Norris-Hulse Professor of Divinity at the University of Cambridge (1949–1960) and a Fellow of Peterhouse, Cambridge (1950–1960). He retired in 1960, was appointed Emeritus Professor by Westminster College, and continued to preach into old age.
