= Première Moisson =

Canadian bakery chain

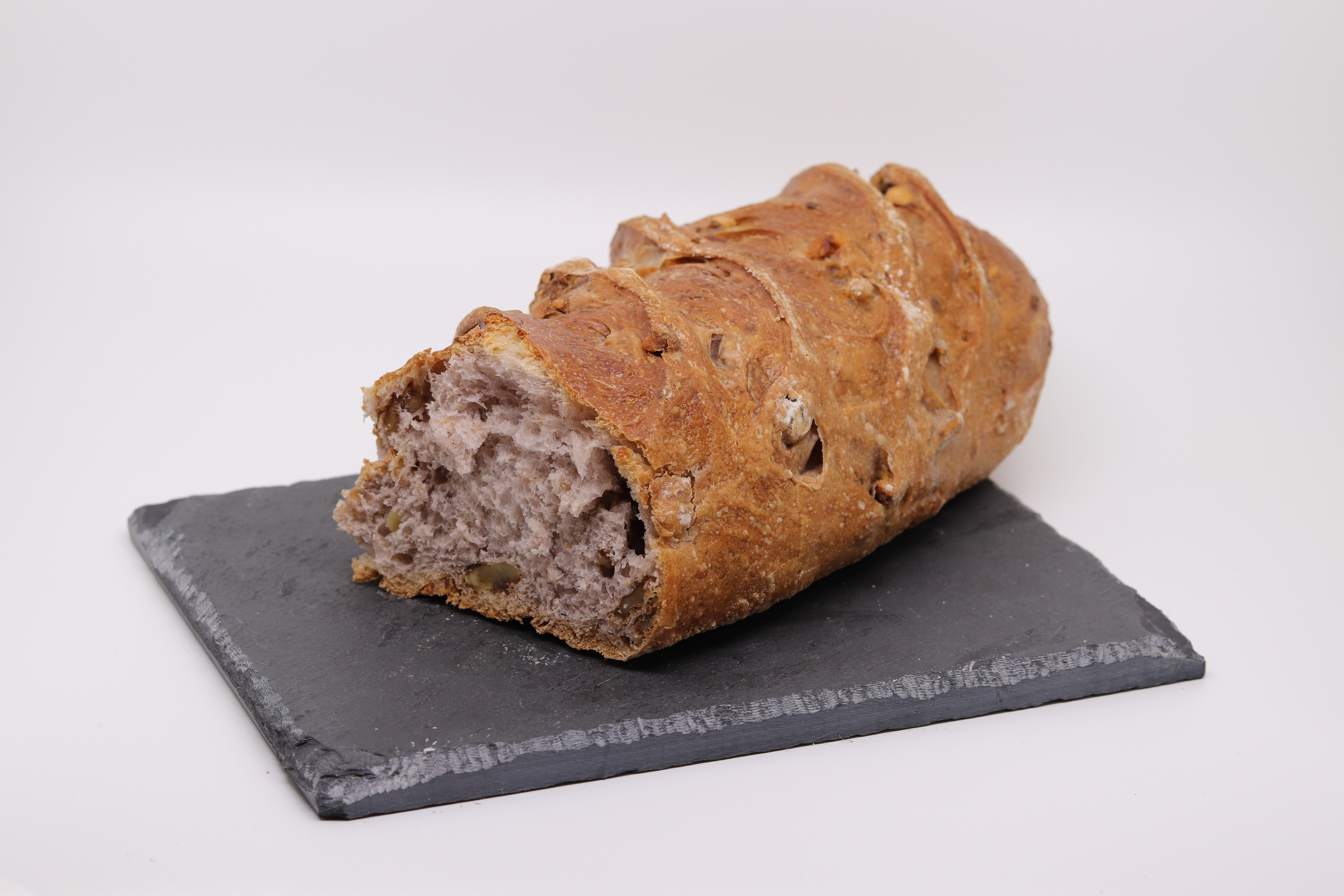
Bread from Première Moisson

Première Moisson is a chain of artisanal bakeries mostly operating in Quebec, Canada, with one store at the University of Ottawa. It focuses on high-quality French breads and pastries. The company follows a model whereby various doughs are prepared in a central facility and then distributed to local bakeries, where they are finalized and baked on demand.

The company was founded in 1992 (33 years ago) in Vaudreuil-Dorion, where it still maintains various large-scale production facilities, and has since remained a family business. The Montreal metropolitan area constitutes its biggest area of business, with a total of 13 bakeries, of which 10 are co-ownerships.
