= McGill Institute of Islamic Studies =

Coordinates: 45.50402°N 73.57772°W

The McGill Institute of Islamic Studies and the Islamic Studies Library were established in 1952 by Wilfred Cantwell Smith, and since 1983 both have been housed in Morrice Hall on McGill's campus in downtown Montreal, Quebec. McGill's institute is the first institute of Islamic studies in North America and hosts 14 full-time professors, 5 visiting positions and 5 professors emeritus.

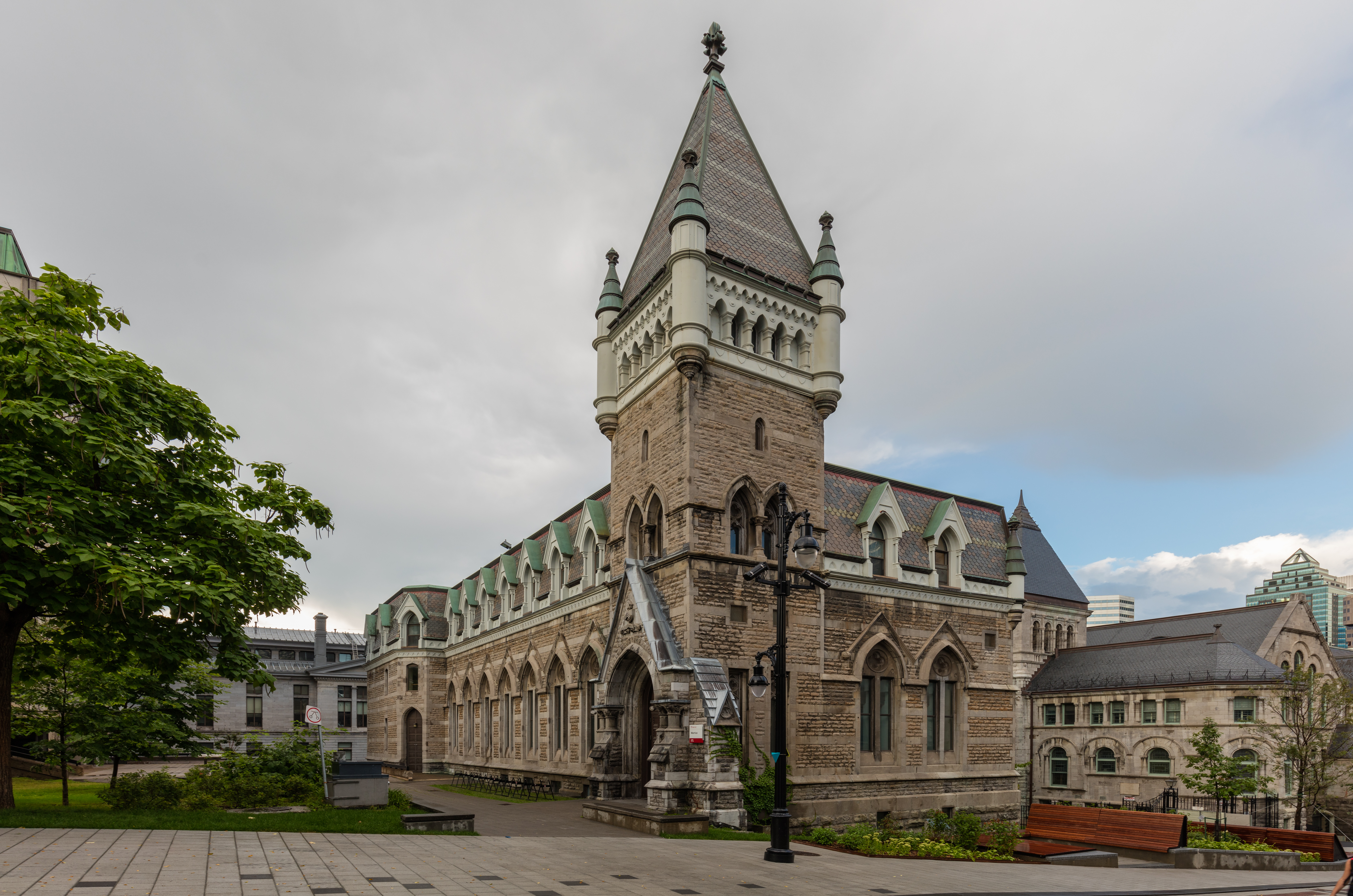
Morrice Hall

== Library ==
The Islamic Studies Library began with only 250 books but grew rapidly. Today, the library holds more than 110,000 volumes, half of them in Islamic languages, and is counted among the major North American collections in Islamic Studies.

== Notable faculty ==
The Institute of Islamic Studies has had numerous famous faculty members, including, Wilfred Cantwell Smith, Toshihiko Izutsu, Isma'il Raji al-Faruqi, Niyazi Berkes, Muhammad Abd-al-Rahman Barker, Fazlur Rahman Malik, Issa J. Boullata, Sajida Alvi, and Wael Hallaq.

== Endowed chairs ==
Urdu Language and Culture: established in April 1987 and funded by the Government of Pakistan, Department of Multiculturalism, Government of Canada, and McGill University.

== Emeritus professors ==
Name of Professor	Emeritus Start Date	Area of Specialty
Charles J. Adams	1-Jan-1993	Religion
Sajida Alvi	1-Jun-2010	History, Religions and Languages of South Asia
Issa J. Boullata	1-Sep-2009	Arabic Language & Literature, Qur'anic Studies
Hermann Landolt	1-Jan-2000	Islamic Thought
Donald P. Little	1-Jan-2000	Medieval Islamic History, especially Mamluk

== Festschrifts ==
Given the high number of influential scholars of the study of Islam, professors of the Institute have been honoured with numerous festschrifts. These include:

- Kamal Abdel-Malek and Wael B. Hallaq, eds. Tradition, modernity, and postmodernity in Arabic literature: Essays in honor of professor Issa J. Boullata. Leiden: Brill, 2000.
- Khaleel Mohammad and Andrew Rippin, eds. Coming to Terms with The Qur'an: a volume in honor of professor Issa Boullata, McGill University. North Haledon: Islamic Publications International, 2007.
- Todd Lawson, ed. Reason and inspiration in Islam: theology, philosophy and mysticism in Muslim thought: essays in honour of Hermann Landolt. London: I.B. Tauris, 2005.
- Wael B. Hallaq and Donald P. Little eds. Islamic studies presented to Charles J. Adams. Leiden: Brill, 1991.
- Donald P. Little, ed. Essays on Islamic civilization: presented to Niyazi Berkes. Leiden: Brill, 1976.
- A special issue of Mamluk Studies Review [vol. 9 no. 1 (2005)] was presented as a festschrift in honor of Donald P Little.

== See also ==
- List of Islamic and Muslim related topics
- Islamic studies
- McGill University Faculty of Arts
