= Islamic Studies Library =

Coordinates: 45.50402°N 73.57772°W

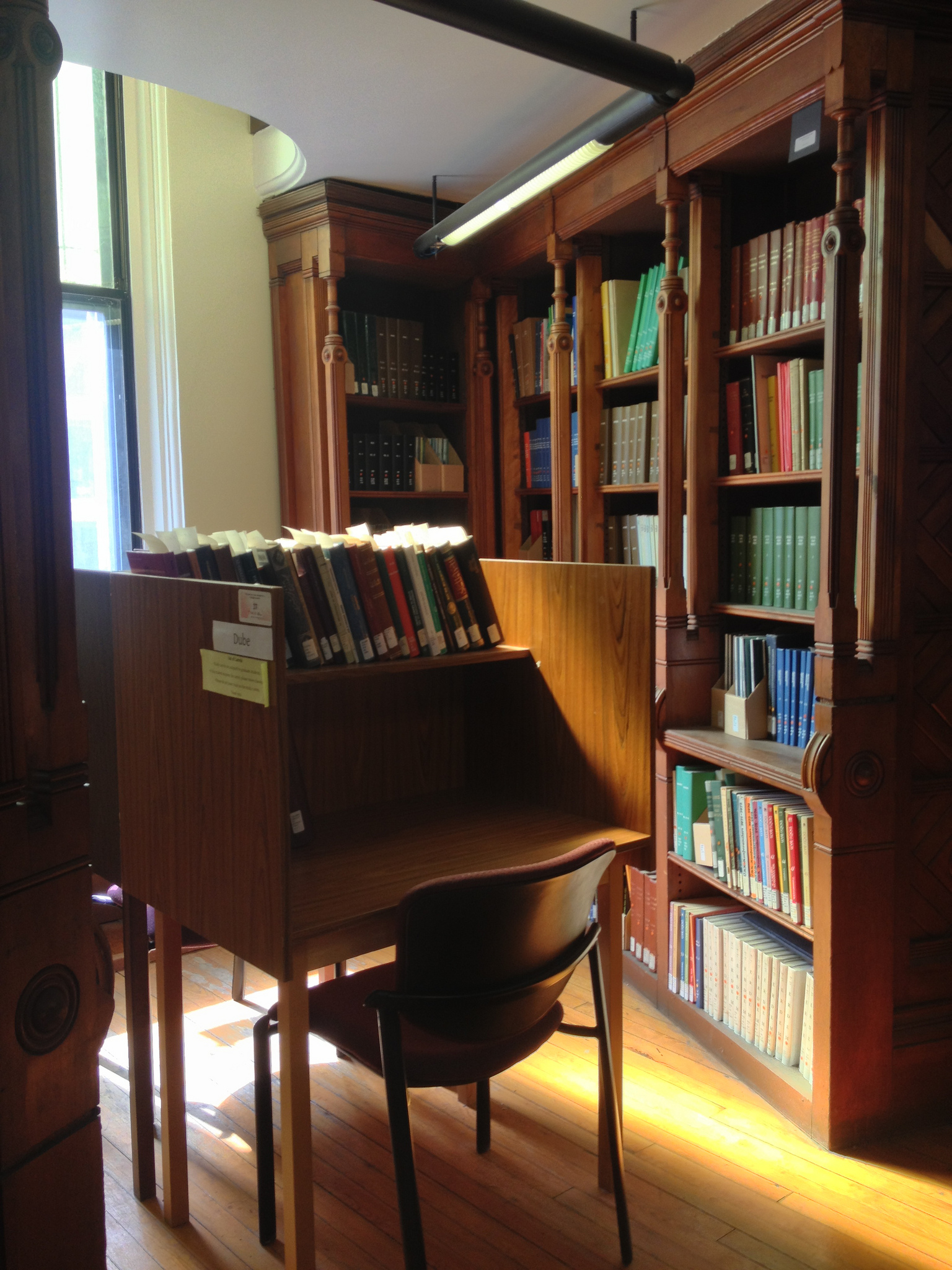
- Desk in the Islamic Studies Library
- Type: Academic
- Established: 1952
- Branch of: McGill University Libraries

Collection
- Items collected: Islamic manuscripts, catalogues, reference materials, Islamic history, classical Islamic texts and works
- Criteria for collection: Islamic Studies, Muslim world

Other information
- Director: Anais Salamon
- Employees: 4
- Website: Islamic Studies Library

The Islamic Studies Library is a branch of the McGill University Libraries system. Its holdings stand together with those of Robarts Library at the University of Toronto as the premier library resources in Canada for research on the Islamic world and among the most important collections in North America.

== History ==
The Islamic Studies library was founded, along with the McGill University Institute of Islamic Studies, in 1952. It has grown from a modest departmental library to a respectable library of approximately 150,000 volumes covering the whole of Islamic civilization. The library is located in Morrice Hall, designed by John J. Browne, and built in 1882.

== Collection ==
The library collections comprise material in print, manuscript, and audiovisual formats. The manuscript collection consists of approximately 640 volumes of literature in Arabic, Persian, Turkish (including Ottoman Turkish) and Urdu. These holdings are located in Rare Books and Special Collections The audiovisual resources consist of microfilms of rare books, and manuscripts (535 reels). Among the printed books there is a collection of approximately 3000 rare items, including a collection of 700 volumes of Arabic, Persian, Urdu and Turkish books printed by lithography.

In general terms, the collection aspires to cover the entire range of Islamic civilization (Islamicate). Geographically this is meant to include South Asia (Bangladesh, India, Afghanistan, Pakistan, etc.), Southeast Asia (Indonesia, etc.), Central Asia (Kyrgyzstan, Tajikistan, Kazakhstan, Uzbekistan, and Turkmenistan), the Middle East (Iran, Iraq, Saudi Arabia, Palestine, Israel, Syria, Jordan, the United Arab Emirates, Oman, and the Yemen), and North Africa (Egypt, Libya, Tunisia, Algeria, Morocco and the Sudan).
