= McGill University Archives =

Coordinates: 45.5033°N 73.5760°W

The McGill University Archives (MUA) performs integrated archival and records management for McGill University. and is housed on the fourth floor of the McLennan Library Building.

The MUA provides a number of searchable, online databases for researchers. In addition, "A Guide to Archival Resources at McGill University" (1985) (Note: See "A Guide to Archival Resources at McGill University") gives a broad overview of archival holdings at McGill University. The McGill University Records Retention Schedule (MURRS) (Note: See McGill University Records Retention Schedule) is also available online, and shows common records created during the daily operations of the University.

The establishment of the McGill University Archives was announced in 1962 by Principal F. Cyril James along with the appointment of McGill's first University Archivist, Mr. Alan Ridge.
