= Rare Books and Special Collections Library =

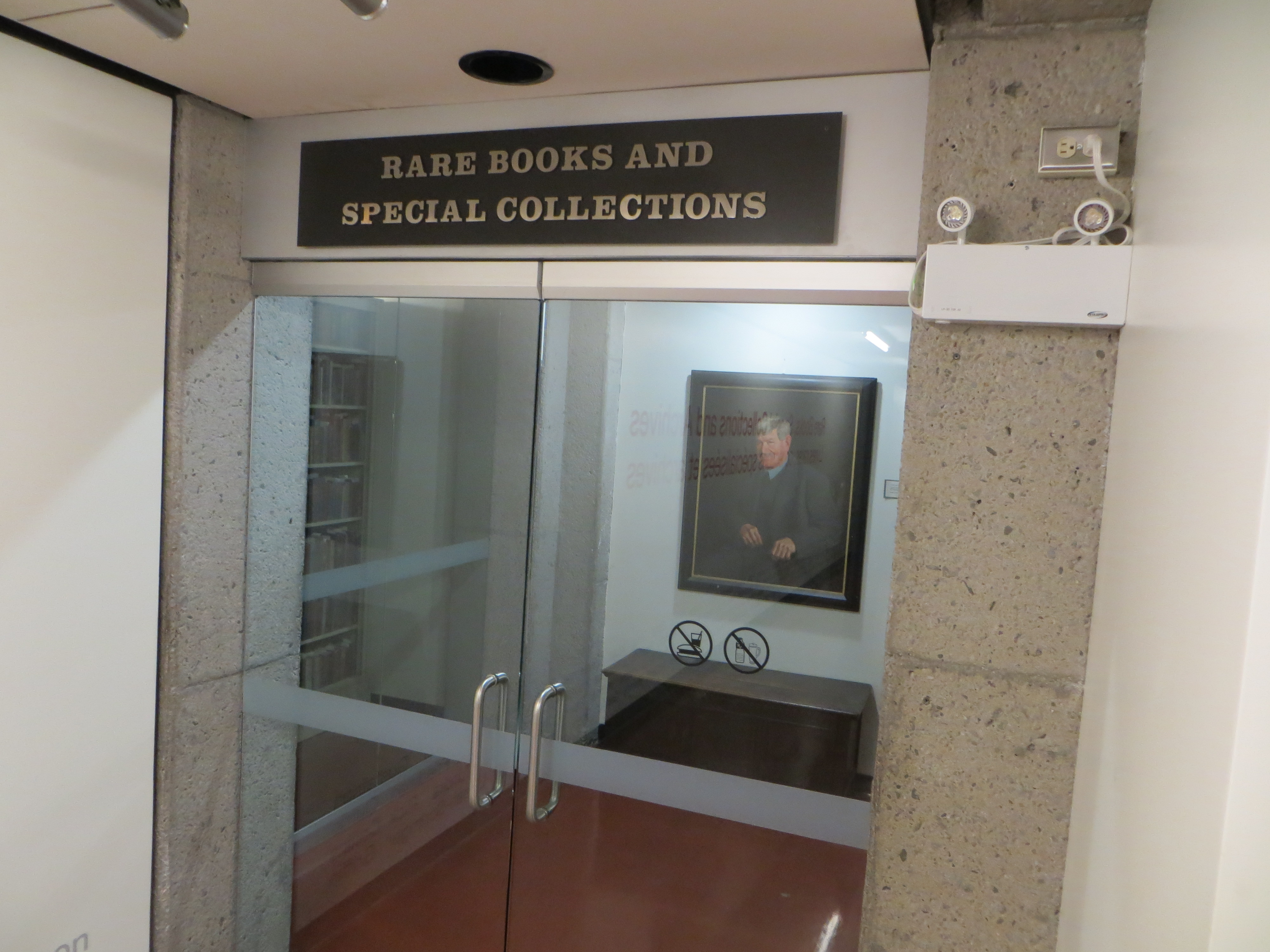
- Entry to the Rare Books and Special Collections Library
- Interactive map of Rare Books and Special Collections Library
- 45.5033°N 73.5760°W
- Alternative name: RBSC
- Location: 3459 McTavish Street, Montreal, H3A 0C9, Canada
- Type: Rare books archive
- Period covered: From the 16th century

Building information
- Building: McLennan Library
- Website: https://www.mcgill.ca/library/branches/rarebooks/about

Rare Books and Special Collections is a part of ROAAr at the McGill University Library in Montreal (Canada), whose mandate is to "support the teaching, learning and research needs of McGill students and faculty from all disciplines, and the wider scholarly community."

== Description ==
Located at the fourth floor of the McLennan Library Building, the unit has a collection core of rare books on the following subjects : art, architecture, Canadiana, history, literature, geography. The library seeks to collect books on Canada, philosophy and 18th-century literature. The Special Collections are focused on several themes, for example : children's literature, cookbooks, puppets. Henceforth, these collections contain other material than books, and, in addition to puppets and other artefacts, also house prints, original drawings by artists such as Palmer Cox

== Archival collection ==
Rare Books and Special Collections also contains an important archival collection, with more than 100 fonds on various subjects such as the fur trade in Canada, Algonquin and Nipissing communities in Oka at the end of the 19th century, the creation of the Red River Settlement by the Earl of Selkirk, Ernest Renan's candidature at the deputation of Meaux, France in 1869.
