= Ravenscrag, Montreal =

Mansion in Canada

Ravenscrag
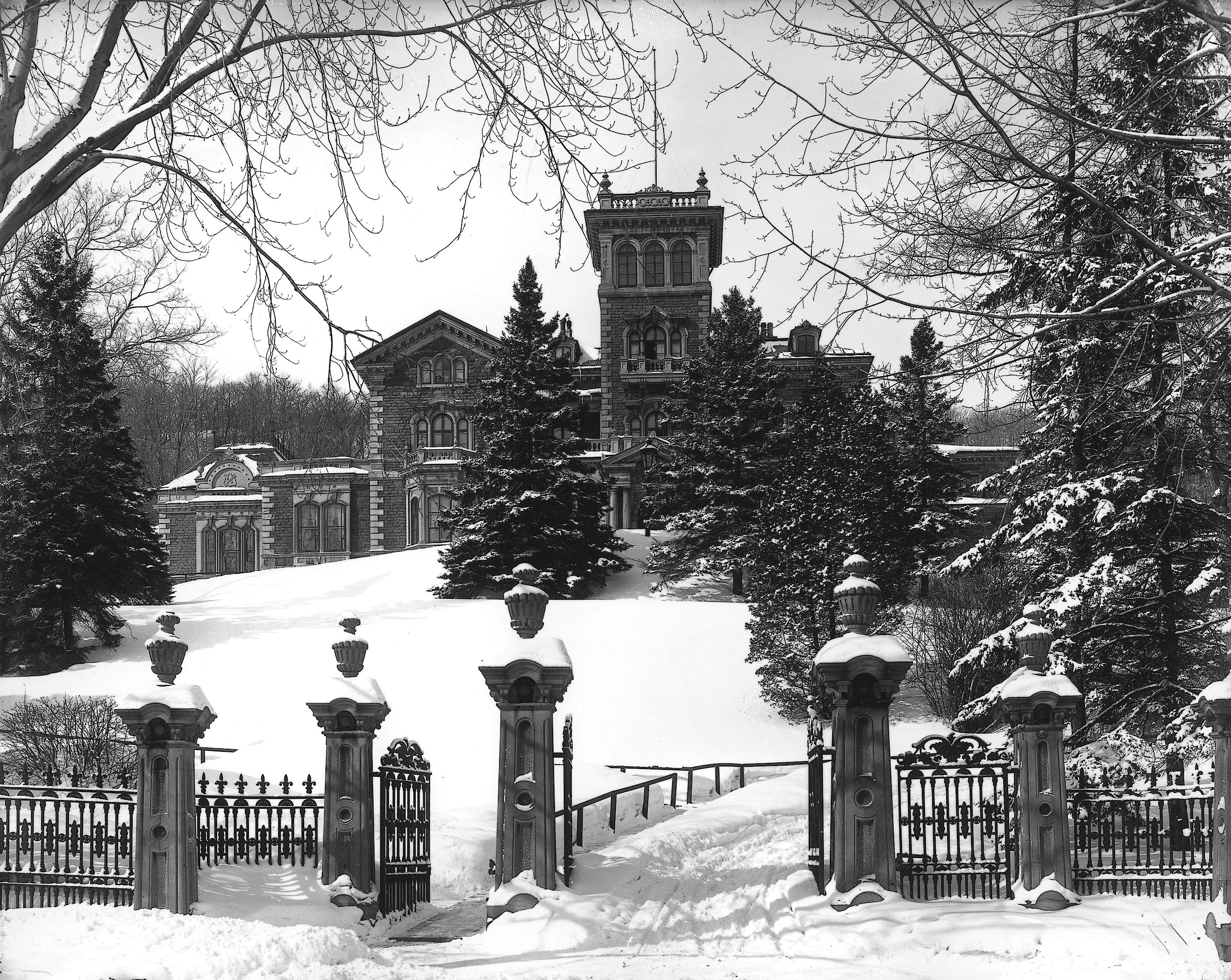
- Ravenscrag from Pine Avenue, 1901

General information
- Type: Mansion
- Architectural style: Italianate Style
- Location: Golden Square Mile, 1025 Pine Avenue West; Montreal, Quebec
- Coordinates: 45.5059°N 73.5821°W
- Current tenants: McGill University Health Centre (MUHC)
- Construction started: 1860
- Completed: 1863
- Destroyed: Interior, 1943
- Client: Sir Hugh Allan
- Owner: Société québécoise des infrastructures (since 2023)

Height
- Height: Tower of 75 feet

Dimensions
- Other dimensions: Frontage of 300 feet

Technical details
- Floor count: 5 floors, 34 rooms (excluding Servants' Quarters and outbuildings)
- Floor area: 4,968 m^{2}

Design and construction
- Architects: Victor Roy (Wm. Spier & Son)
- Main contractor: William Spier & Son (Superintendent); George Roberts (Carpenter & Joiner); Daniel Wilson & Co. (Masonry); Alex Wand & Henry Jackson (Brick-laying); John McFarlane (Plumber)

Ravenscrag (also known as Hugh Allan House and Hugh Montagu Allan House) is a historic mansion located in the Golden Square Mile in Montreal (Quebec), Canada.

Built mainly between 1861 and 1863, this house was the residence of Sir Hugh Allan from 1863 to 1882 and to his son Sir Hugh Montagu Allan from 1882 to 1940. In 1940, the Allan family donated the house to the Royal Victoria Hospital. Since 1943, the building has housed the Allan Memorial Institute, which houses the hospital's psychiatry department, and since 1997, the psychiatry department of McGill University Health Centre (MUHC). Following the move of the Royal Victoria Hospital in 2015, the future of Ravenscrag is uncertain. In 2023, the MUHC transferred the property to the Société québécoise des infrastructures (SQI) in order to realize McGill University's new pavilion project called "Royal Victoria". The MUHC remains tenant until 2028.

This residence was designed by architect Victor Roy of the firm William Spier & Son in the Italianate style, following the trends of Victorian architecture. Around 1865, architect John William Hopkins of the firm Hopkins & Wily superintended the construction of the reception rooms annexed to the house and of the greenhouse, following the plans of architect Victor Roy. After the construction of the reception rooms around 1865, the house had 34 rooms, excluding the servants' quarters and outbuildings. Often qualified as ″the most sumptuous Montreal residence of the 19th century″, the interior was decorated by the Italian painter Giuseppe Guidicini, the team of the Canadian painter John McArthur, the team of the carpenter and joiner George Roberts and the interior decoration company J. & W. Hilton of Montreal.

Hugh Allan baptized his residence "Ravenscrag" following its construction in the 1860s. This residence is part of the former Hugh Allan estate which also includes stables, a Gate house and a park. This estate was recognized by the City of Montreal in 1987 and by the Government of Quebec in 2005 as an integral part of the "Site patrimonial du Mont-Royal" (Mount Royal Heritage Site). It was also declared to be integrated into the "Secteur de valeur patrimoniale exceptionnelle Hôpital Royal Victoria" (Royal Victoria Hospital Historic District) by the City in 2004.

== Site ==
Ravenscrag is located at 835-1025 Pine Avenue West in the Golden Square Mile district of the Ville-Marie borough in the city of Montreal. It is located approximately 3.5 km from Old Montreal. More precisely, the house is located on the southeast slope of Mount Royal and is located at the top of McTavish Street. It can be accessed from the main gate on Pine Avenue West or from the entrance near Peel Street further west.

== History ==
=== Before 1861 : land purchase and conception ===
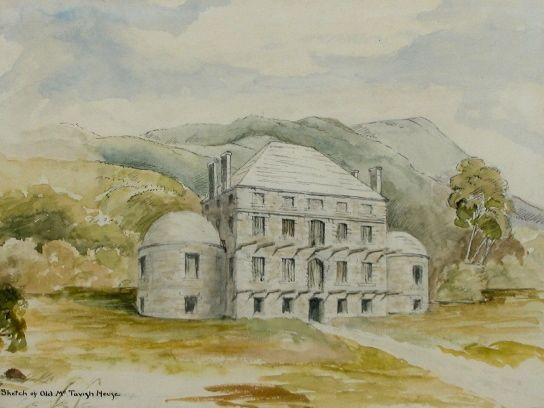
McTavish House (circa 1850)

The land on which Ravenscrag is built was previously part of the estate of Simon McTavish, a wealthy fur trader, which once stretched from the top of the mountain in the north to Saint Catherine Street in the south, and from the property of James McGill in the east to beyond Drummond Street in the west. In 1803, Simon McTavish decided to build a "chateau" on his estate, intended to honour his wife, Marie-Marguerite Chaboillez. However, in 1804, he died during construction and construction stopped. The half-completed house was then left abandoned until its demolition in 1860. In the meantime, the McTavish estate underwent several subdivisions by land investors such as John Torrance, Hugh Taylor and John Hutchison. Some of these lots were sold on November 23, 1853 at an auction organised by auctioneer John Leeming. On this occasion, Hugh Allan purchased from David Torrance for the sum of £2,250 a 10 acres (40,000 m^{2}) lot of land located on the south-east slope of Mount Royal, above McTavish house and bordering the McTavish burial site to the east. (Note: City Assessment for St. Antoine Ward, p. 51 (1854)) However, there is no information to determine Hugh Allan's intention regarding the use he intended for this lot of land when he purchased it. He was himself a land investor: during his life, he purchased several lots of land in the St. Antoine ward in Montreal on which he had houses or apartment buildings built for rental. (Note: Notorial Act, minute no. 821, August 10, 1853, A.N.Q.) However, the construction of buildings intended for rental (row houses or apartment buildings) was at this time rather rare in the northeast of Sherbrooke Street, between McGill University and Guy Street. Due to their privileged location on the mountain, these lands tended to be used as estates on which residences were built in the style of an English country house, following the British trend in architecture for wealthy families. For example, were built in that area during the 1860s the houses of John Redpath, named "Terrace Bank" (1861), Orrin S. Wood, known as "Braehead" (1861), Andrew Allan, known as "Iononteh" (1865), and David Lewis (1868).

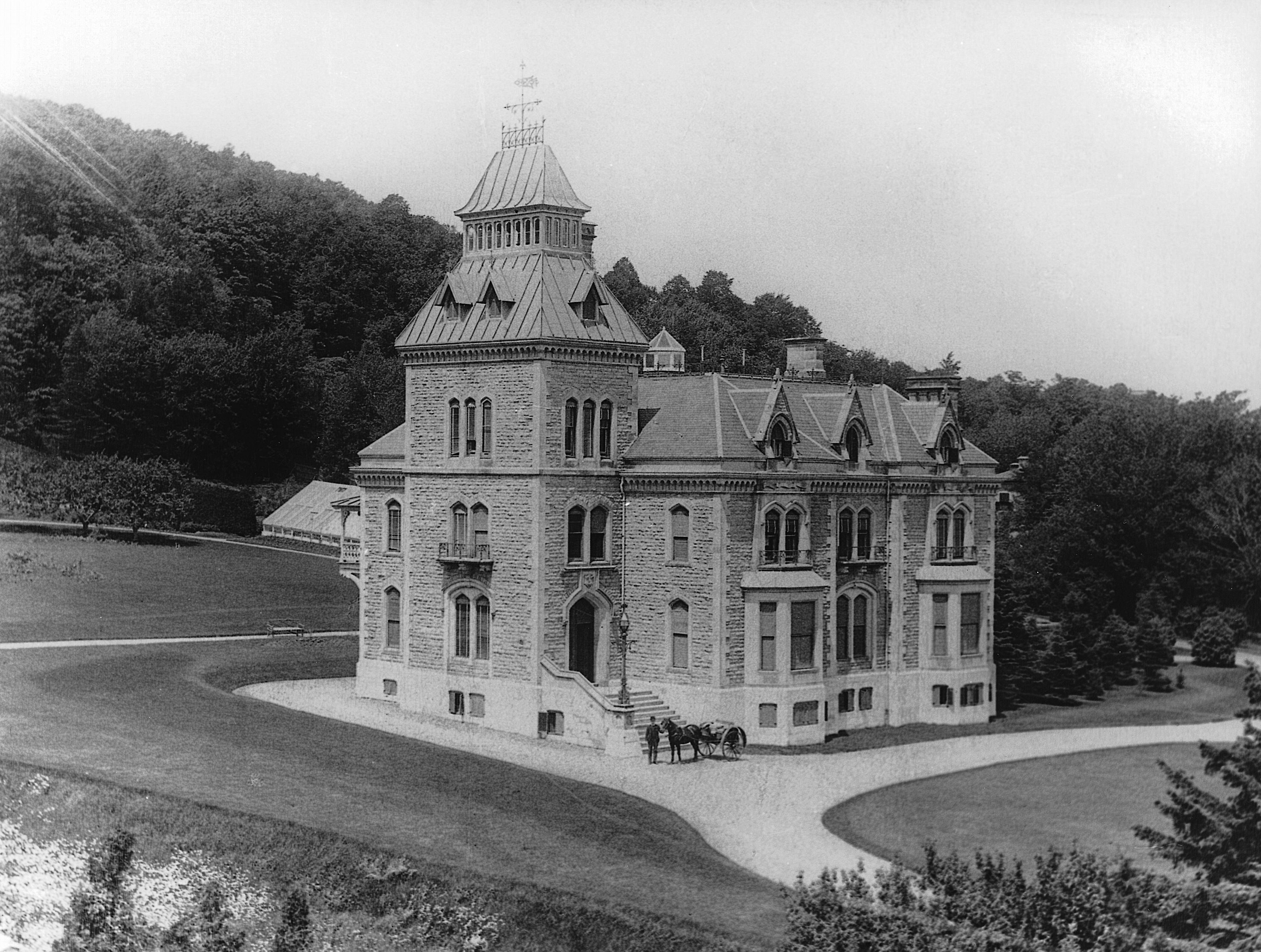
Terrace Bank (1861), John Redpath residence

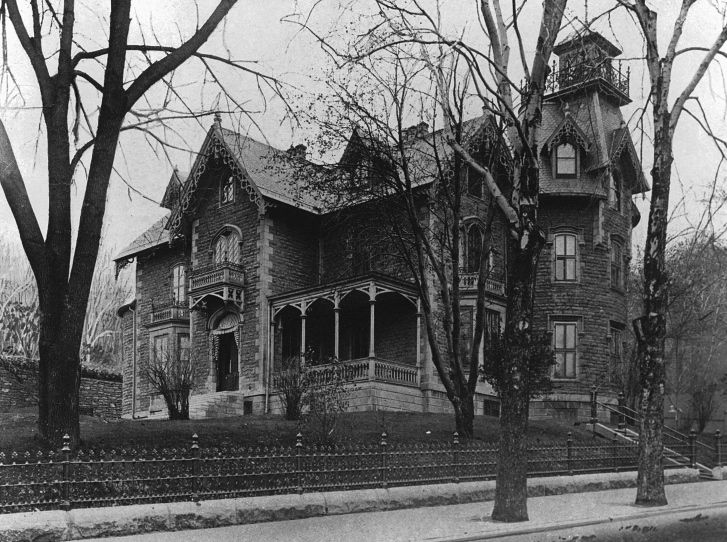
Braehead (1861), Orrin Squire Wood's residence

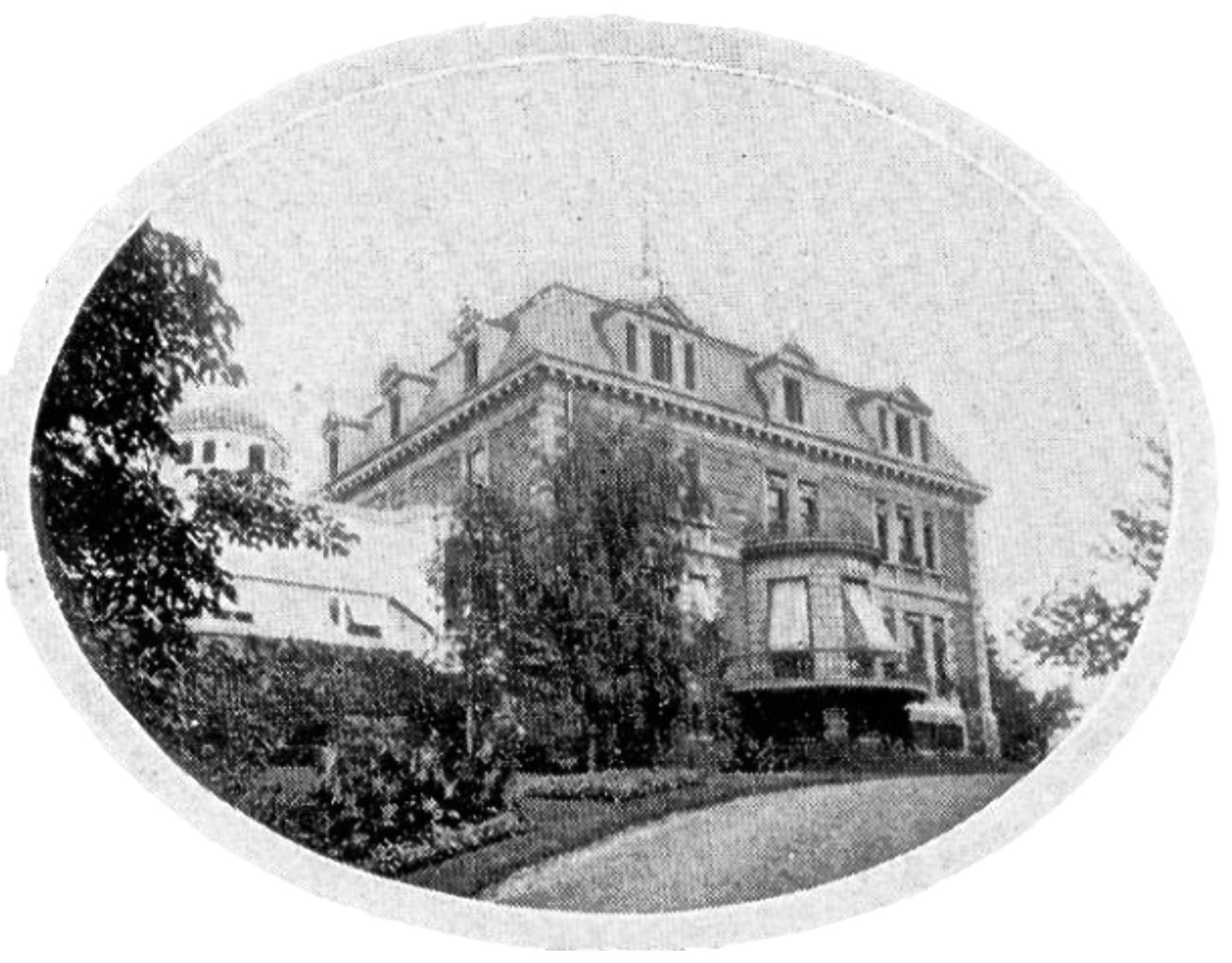
Iononteh (1865), Andrew Allan's residence

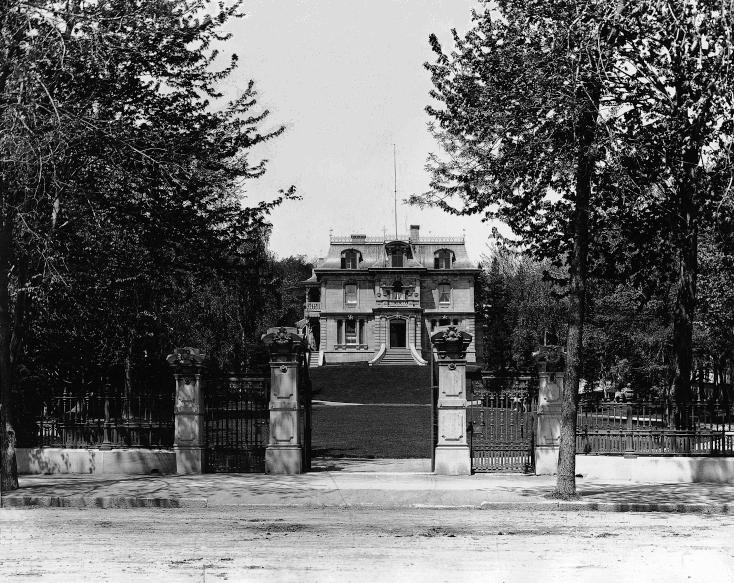
David Lewis House (1868)

On 13 October 1860, Hugh Allan and his wife, Matilda Caroline Smith, had their fourth child and third son, Hugh Montagu Allan. It was at this time that Hugh Allan decided to build a new residence that reflected his wealth and power. He decided to build a new home on his land located on the southeast slope of Mount Royal, away from the noise, bustle and prying eyes of the city, thus benefiting from more space, comfort and privacy. The chosen location of the estate also had the advantage of being neither too close to the city nor too far away, allowing him to access it quickly.

Around 1860, he hired the architectural firm William Spier & Son to design and build his future mansion. (Note: Notarial Act, minute no. 7081, October 29, 1860, A.N.Q.) Victor Roy, an architect from that firm, was responsible for drawing up the plans. He designed the house as a villa or as an English country house in the Italianate style. He followed the architectural trend of the time, which was inspired by the British royal summer residence of Osborne House, built between 1845 and 1851 for Queen Victoria and Prince Albert on the Isle of Wight. Several houses in England, in the British colonies and in North America, built up until the 1870s, were modeled upon this royal residence. Even in Montreal, several mansions were built in the Italianate style during the 1850s and 1860s, including the Harrison Stephens house (1857), the Joseph Mackay house (1858) and the David R. Wood house (1859). However, there is no information indicating why this style was chosen for Ravenscrag, or whether it was a preference of the architect or the client. On the other hand, the construction of Henry Lyman's residence on McTavish Street in 1859 according to the plans of the architect Richard C. Windeyer may have played a determining role in the choice of the architectural style of Ravenscrag. Indeed, this "villa" has the same architectural style as Ravenscrag. However, this house was demolished in 1941 to make way for a 24-unit appartement building.

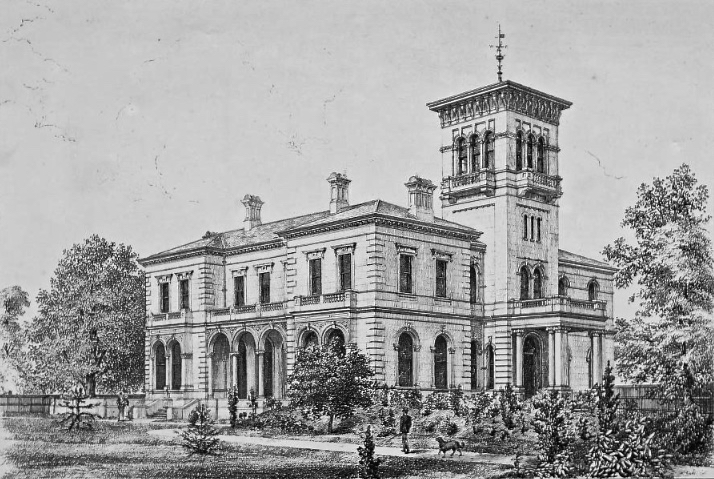
Hillfield House (1862), designed by architect John Giles

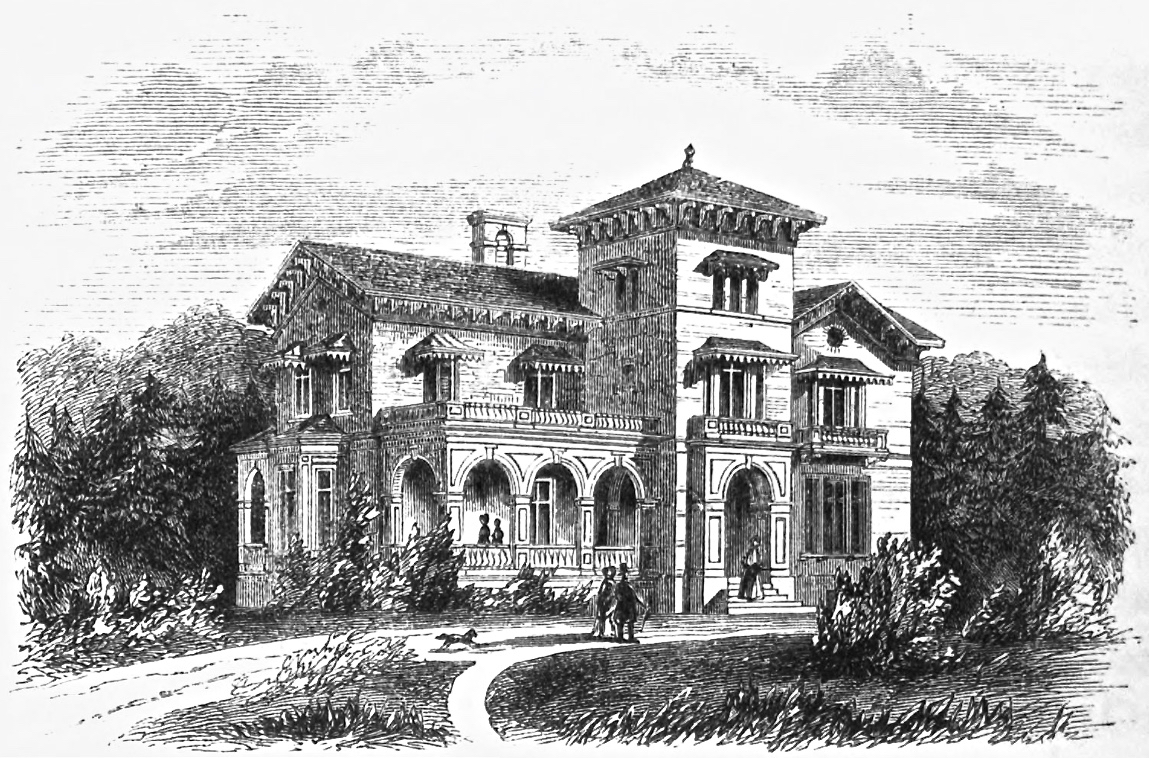
R. P. Dodge Residence (1864) designed by architectural firm Downing & Vaux from New York

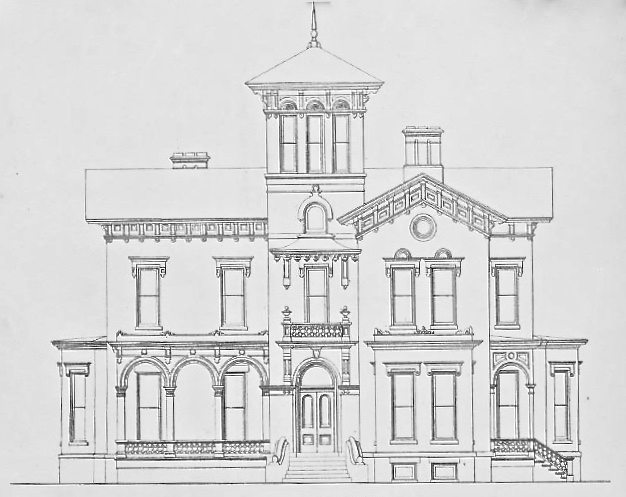
Hubbell House (1868) designed by architectural firm Kuler & Hubbell (Toledo, Ohio)

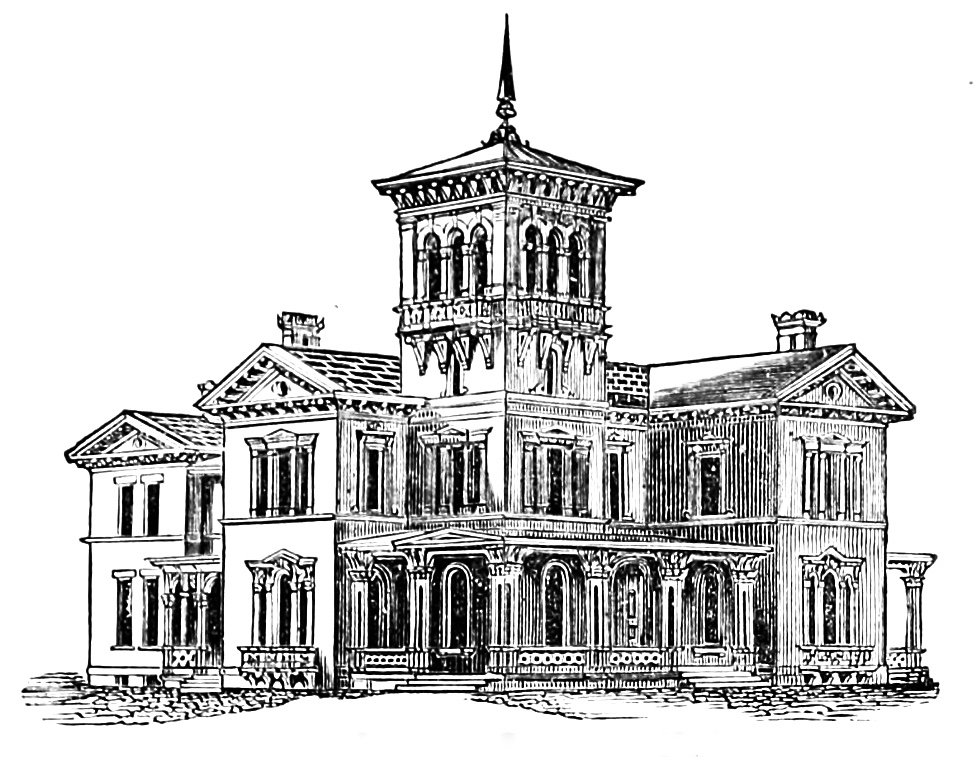
House design (1869) for an Italianate villa by architect L. B. Young (Cincinnati, Ohio)

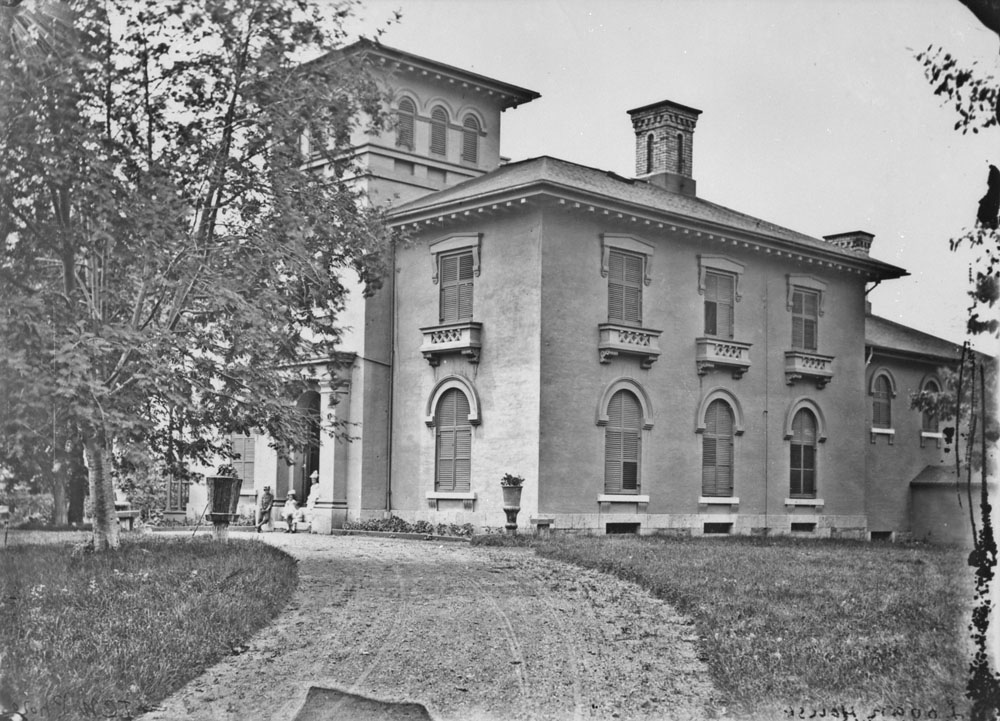
Logan House, called "Rockfield" (1850s), Montreal, Quebec

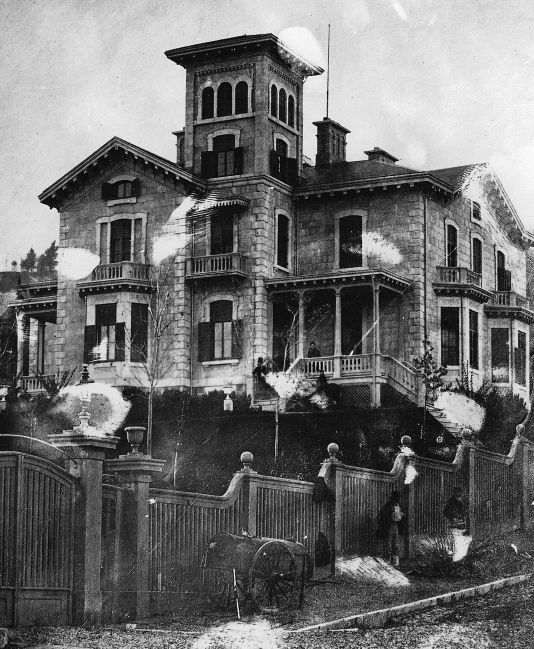
Henry Lyman's residence, called "Thornhill" (1859), Montreal, Quebec

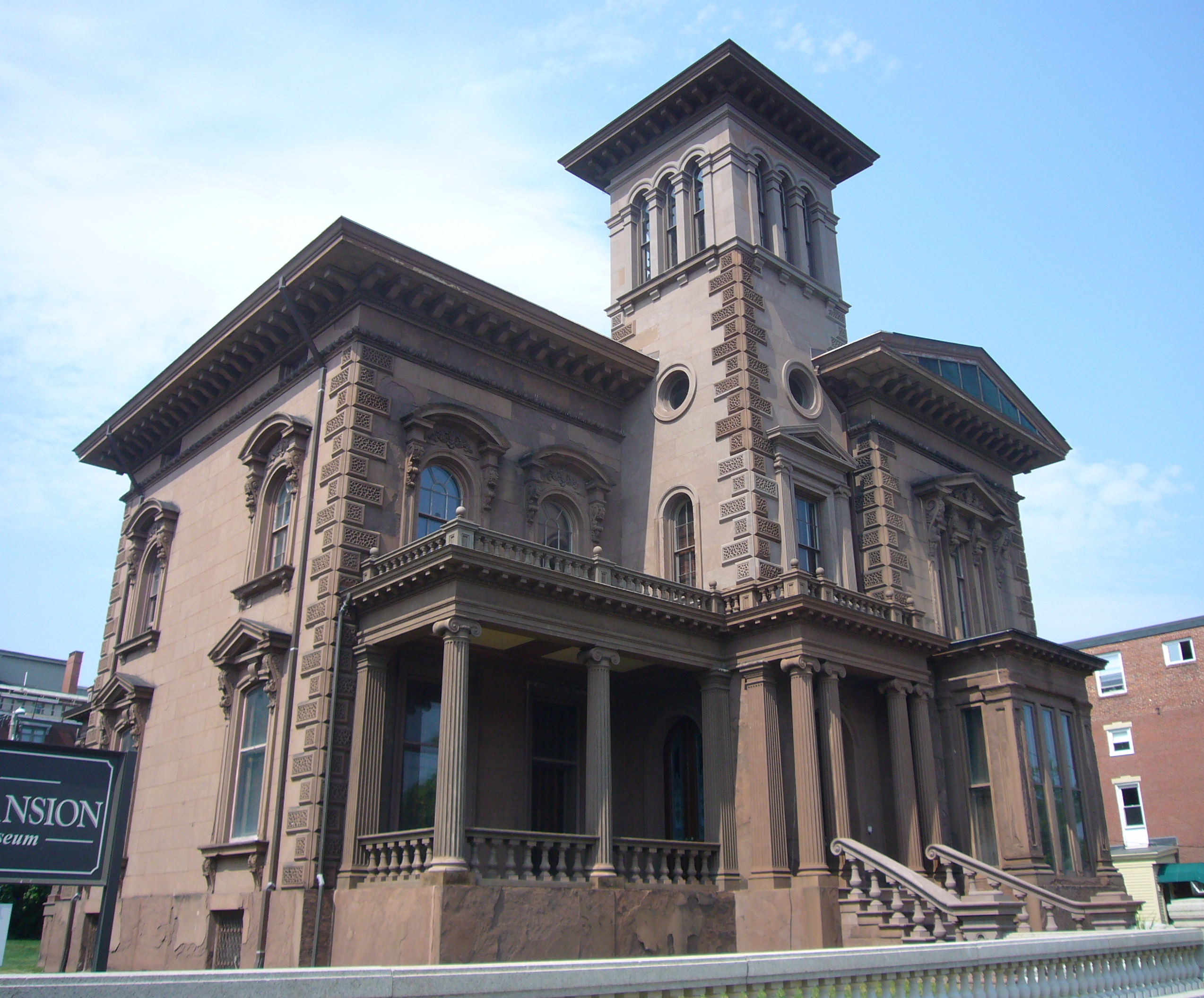
Victoria Mansion (1860), Portland, Maine

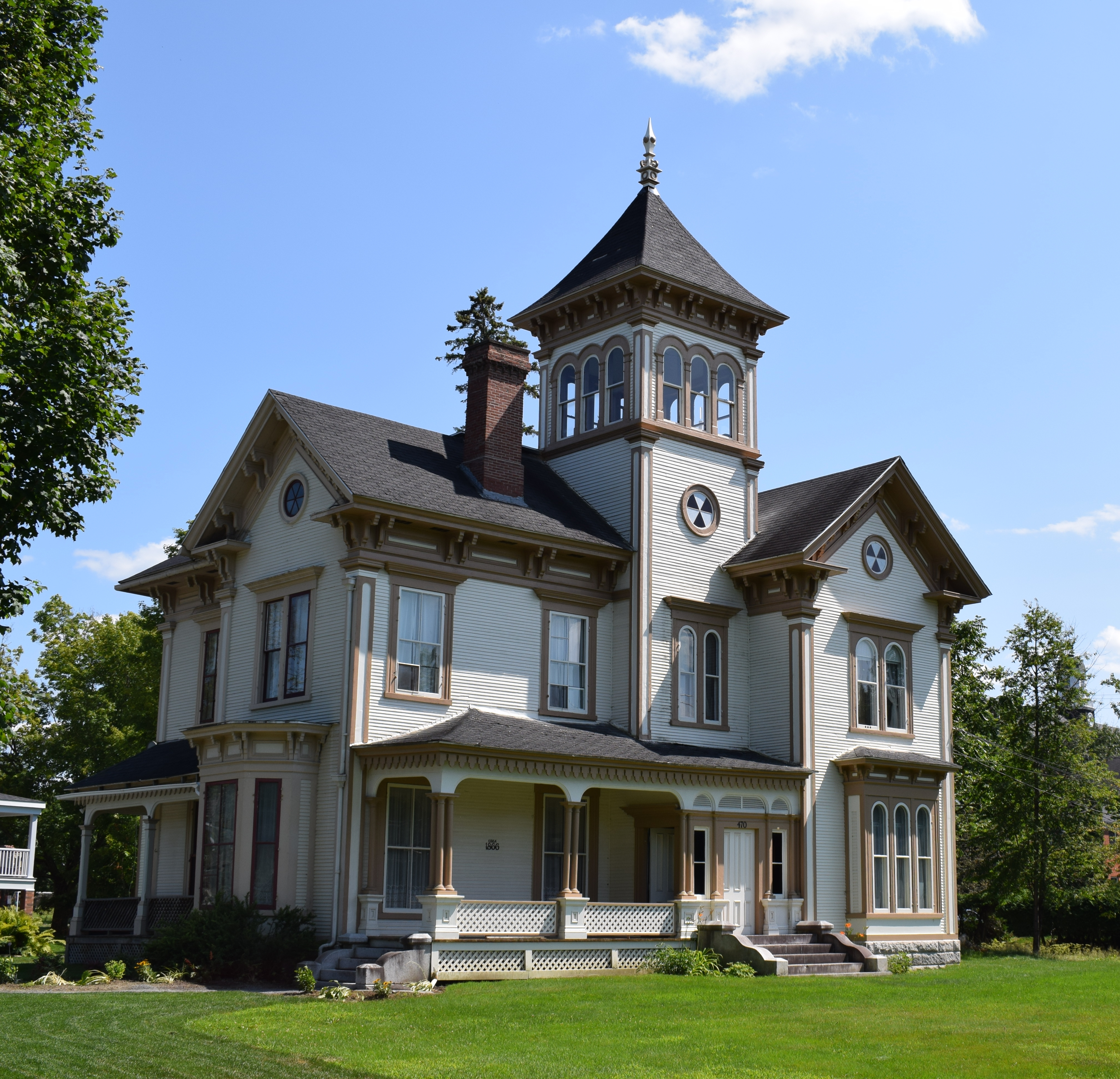
Isaac Butters House (1866), Stanstead, Quebec

=== 1861 to 1863 : construction ===
Years	Construction stages	Architects	Contractors
1861-1863	Construction of the main house and its wing dedicated to servants, a boundary wall and gates, the stable and the Gate house.	Victor Roy : architect designer, and William Spier & Son : superintendent (Note: Notorial Act, minute no. 7929, May 27, 1861, A.N.Q.)	Wilson & Co.: masonry; (Note: Notorial Act, minute no. 7932, May 27, 1861, A.N.Q.) John Macfarlane: plumbing (heating by hot water and gas lighting); Alex Wand and Henry Jackson: bricklaying; George Roberts: carpentry, joinery & cabinetmaking, painting, staining & varnishing, gilding and glazing; (Note: Notorial Act, minute no. 8136, July 30, 1861, A.N.Q.) Montreal Foundry and City Works: wrought iron gates.
Btw October 1862 and April 1863	Execution of decorative paintings, particularly for the drawing room and the library	Alexander G. Fowler and Victor Roy (?) (superintendent)	Giuseppe Guidicini (Note: Palmer 2026, p. 207)
Circa 1865	Construction of a new billiard room, an anteroom to the ballroom, the ballroom and the greenhouse	Victor Roy from Fowler & Roy (architect designer); John William Hopkins from Hopkins & Wily (superintendent)	Wilson & Co.: masonry; John Macfarlane: plumbing (heating by hot water and gas lighting; Alex Wand and Henry Jackson: bricklaying; George Roberts: carpentry, joinery & cabinetmaking, painting, staining & varnishing, gilding and glazing; Montreal Foundry and City Works: wrought iron gates.
1872	Ballroom painted decorations	N/A	John McArthur & Son (?)
1889	Extension of the servants' wing (Note: Lambert, du Prey & James 1983)	Andrew Thomas Taylor and George William Gordon	(?)
1898-1899	Extension of the stable, dining room, portico	Andrew Thomas Taylor and George William Gordon	Wighton & Morison Co.: masonry; Walter P. Scott, Decorator: carpentry & cabinetmaking (Hubertus McGuire), painting, gilding, staining & varnishing, hangings/tapestry and glazing.
Circa 1902	Reconstruction and expansion of the greenhouse	(?)	Lord & Burnham Co.
1907	Reconstruction of the boundary wall along Pine avenue	C. Levitt (New York architect)	Gray & Wighton
1926	Reconstruction of part of the boundary wall (Note: City of Montreal Permits and Inspections Department, Permit no. 2916, 1926-07-17.)		John Wighton
1936 (abandoned)	Redevelopment project (abandoned)	Ross & Macdonald	(N/A)
1943-44	Transformation into a hospital (Note: City of Montreal Permits and Inspections Department, Permit no. 3060, 1943-12-03.)	Harold Lawson & H.B. Little	Sutherland Construction Co.
1945	Elimination of the galleries to the west of the tower and modification of the facade (Note: City of Montreal Permits and Inspections Department, Permit no. 3103, 1945-08-30.)	Harold Lawson & H.B. Little	Sutherland Construction Co.
1952-53	Construction of the rear annex	E.I. Barott, L.E. Marshall, R.A. Montgomery & J.C. Merret	
1963	Construction of the Irvin Ludmer Pavilion	Marshall & Merret	
1964	Interior modifications (Note: City of Montreal Permits and Inspections Department, Permit no. 932, 1964-04-23.)		Angus Robertson
1986	Construction of a new annex (20 additional beds)	Larose, Petrucci / Lemay, Leclerc, architects	
1988	Restoration of the Gate house	Gersovitz, Becker & Moss	
1991	Restoration of the main entrance doors		Paul Don
1993	Restoration of the vestibule, hall and stable		
1994	Restoration of part of the front facade (masonry) of the stable		Robert Fortier
1996	Roof repairs (Note: City of Montreal Permits and Inspections Department, Permit no. 100089596-96, 1996-02-02.)		
1996-1997	Replacement of seventeen (17) windows on the ground floor, west side, without changing the dimensions (Note: City of Montreal Permits and Inspections Department, Permit no. 1001055696-96, 1996-12-11.)		
2004-2006	Renovation of the Irvin Ludmer Pavilion	Jodoin, Lamarre & Pratte	
2005	Redevelopment of offices located on the second floor, no exterior work (Note: City of Montreal Permits and Inspections Department, Permit no. 3000009678-05, 2005-11-23.)		
2005	Roof repairs and addition of new flashings to parapets (Note: City of Montreal Permits and Inspections Department, Permit no. 3000010037-05, 2005-12-09.)		
2006	Roof repairs and addition of new flashings to parapets (Note: City of Montreal Permits and Inspections Department, Permit no. 3000011277-06, 2006-03-09.)		
2006	Renovation of the roof of the Gate house (Note: City of Montreal Permits and Inspections Department, Permit no. 3000011893-06, 2006-04-03.)		
2006	Redevelopment of offices (suites P2.039 to P2.042A) located on the second floor, no exterior work (Note: City of Montreal Permits and Inspections Department, Permit no. 33000015629-06, 2006-08-04.)		
2006	Restoration of the south-east (over 25 metres) and south-west (largely) stone fences, no other exterior work (Note: City of Montreal Permits and Inspections Department, Permit no. 3000016579-06, 2006-09-08.)		
2007	Restoration of the south stone fences and construction of a new retaining wall adjacent to the parking lot, no other exterior work (Note: City of Montreal Permits and Inspections Department, Permit no. 3000024196-07, 2007-06-19.)		
2008	On the kitchen roof, right side interior courtyard, addition of an air conditioning unit (Note: City of Montreal Permits and Inspections Department, Permit no. 3000039071-08, 2008-10-27.)		
2012-2013	Complete interior renovation and window replacement of the Irving Ludmer Pavilion	Vincent Leclerc & Associates, architects	

On May 27, 1861, work officially began. David Wilson and John MacFarlane of Wilson & Co. were responsible for the masonry, while Wand & Jackson was responsible for the bricklaying. John MacFarlane also installed the hot water heating system and the gas lighting system. George Roberts' company carried out all the carpentry, joinery, cabinetmaking, varnishing, painting, gilding and glazing. The bricklaying work continued until November 1861, while the masonry work extended until June 1862. Finally, the work carried out by George Roberts' company extended until October 1862. This work was then supervised by the architectural firm of William Spier & Son. However, during 1862, the architectural firm of Fowler & Roy, where the architect Victor Roy was now working, took over the contract for superintendence of the work site from the firm of William Spier & Son, dissolved towards the end of 1861.

In an article published on February 24, 1862 in the Montreal Herald and Daily Commercial Gazette, the author reported on the progress of the work. He mentioned in particular that the tower was still under construction and that "a conservatory is to be erected at the south-west end of the building." In addition, a water tank was built above the residence, in the mountain, at a sufficient height to supply the building with water up to the third floor.

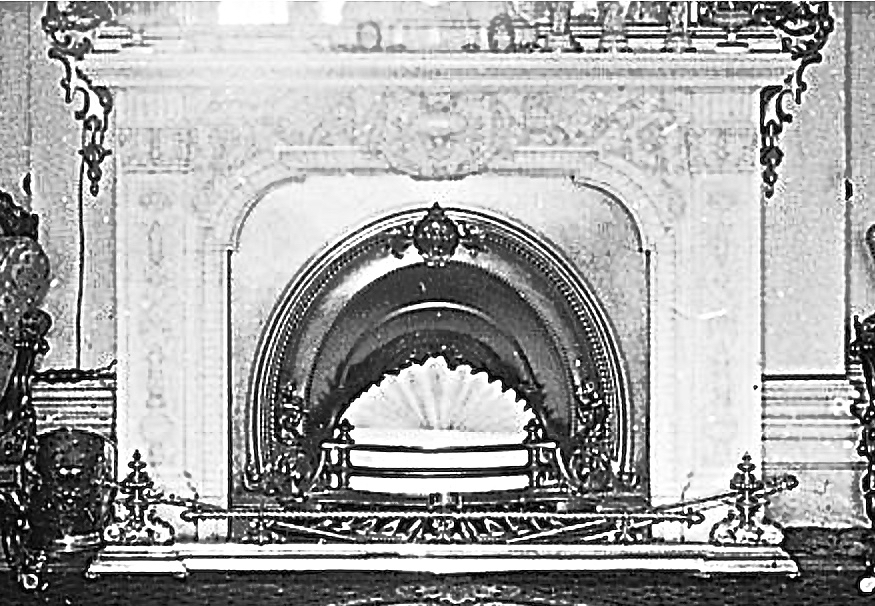
Fireplace mantel in the drawing room in Carrara marble

Towards the end of 1862, Hugh Allan hired the Italian painter Giuseppe Guidicini to decorate his new residence. For a month or two, between October 1862 and April 1863, the artist painted the decorations, particularly for the drawing room and the billiard room (converted into a library around 1865). During this same period, the firm of J. & W. Hilton furnished the library, and most likely the other reception rooms in the house. Hugh Allan also commissioned “a work” in marble around September 1862 from the Montreal sculptors Jules Souquère and Gervais Buffle (Souquère, Buffle & Co.), (Note: Mackay & 1859-1870, p. 58 (Montreal Directory), Year 1862–63) probably the Carrara marble fireplace mantel in the drawing room.

After 1862, changes were made to the architectural plans of the residence. Hugh Allan commissioned the architectural firm of Fowler & Roy, successors to William Spier & Son, to add reception rooms to the main building. Victor Roy then designed a ballroom and two antechambers, all located between the main building and the greenhouse. The greenhouse, which had already been planned in the original plans, was then moved or offset further south of the main building. Although these new rooms were designed by the architectural firm of Fowler & Roy, construction of these rooms would instead be under superintendence of the architectural firm of Hopkins & Wily around 1865.

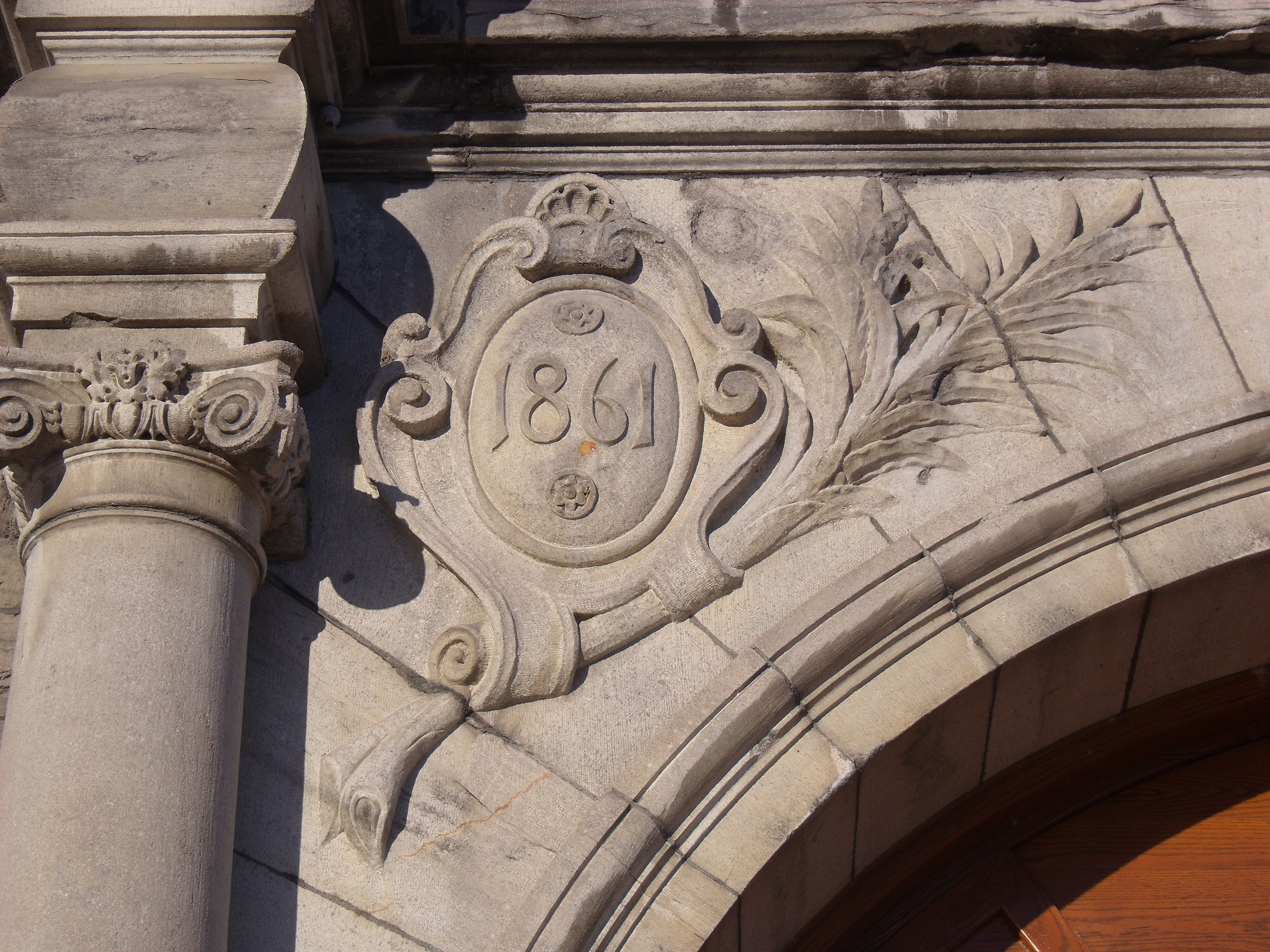
The original year of construction '1861' of Ravenscrag Stables, engraved on a cartouche above the main door.

Since the original architectural plans, elevations and drawings for the construction of Ravenscrag are missing, little information exists on the construction of the boundary wall and some of the outbuildings (gate house and stables). The known building contracts, written in 1861, give no details on the construction of these buildings. These contracts only mention the construction of a "mansion" on Hugh Allan's land, and the specifications in the appendix only add details, among other things, on the "wing" dedicated to the servants or the greenhouse (conservatory). However, by 1863, the construction of the outbuildings (gate house and stables) was completed and the estate was entirely enclosed by a boundary wall. Indeed, a photograph taken by William Notman in 1863 already bears witness to the existence of the gate house and the surrounding wall. In addition, a work published by the Canada Railway Advertising Company in 1864 specifies that it was the Montreal Foundry and City Works that made the wrought iron grilles for the gates of the estate, confirming that the construction of the surrounding wall predates 1864. As for the stable, Hugh Montagu Allan had the year of initial construction of the building engraved directly above the main door during the modifications carried out in 1898. The construction of the surrounding wall, the gate house and the stable was therefore completely completed when the Allan family moved to Ravenscrag.

In April 1863, Hugh Allan and his family moved into their new residence. Hugh Allan, however, kept his previous residence located at 411 Saint Catherine Street (between City Councillors and St. Alexander Streets) until his death for rental purposes. In fact, in May 1863, he rented it to his brother, Andrew Allan, for a period of three years. (Note: Notorial Act, minute no. 10281, March 26, 1863, A.N.Q.) This house would later be purchased by Methodists who would build the St. James Church there, nicknamed the “Cathedral of Methodism,” which would become the St. James United Church in the 1920s. As for the servants, the City of Montreal's property assessment roll report mentions that Hugh Allan had been collecting rent from his servants who lived on the Ravenscrag estate since 1863. (Note: City Assessment for St. Antoine Ward, p. 87 (1863)) (Note: City Assessment for St. Antoine Ward, p. 106 (1864)) (Note: City Assessment for St. Antoine Ward, p. 109 (1865)) The servants therefore moved in at the same time as the Allan family. The Lovell Directory even specifies in 1865 that the gardener and caretaker of Ravenscrag, Joseph Gordon, resides at the address preceding the address of Hugh Allan on McTavish Street, confirming that he lives in the gate house. (Note: Mackay & 1859-1870, p. 342 (Street Directory), Year 1865–66)

=== 1863 to 1882 : Hugh Allan ===
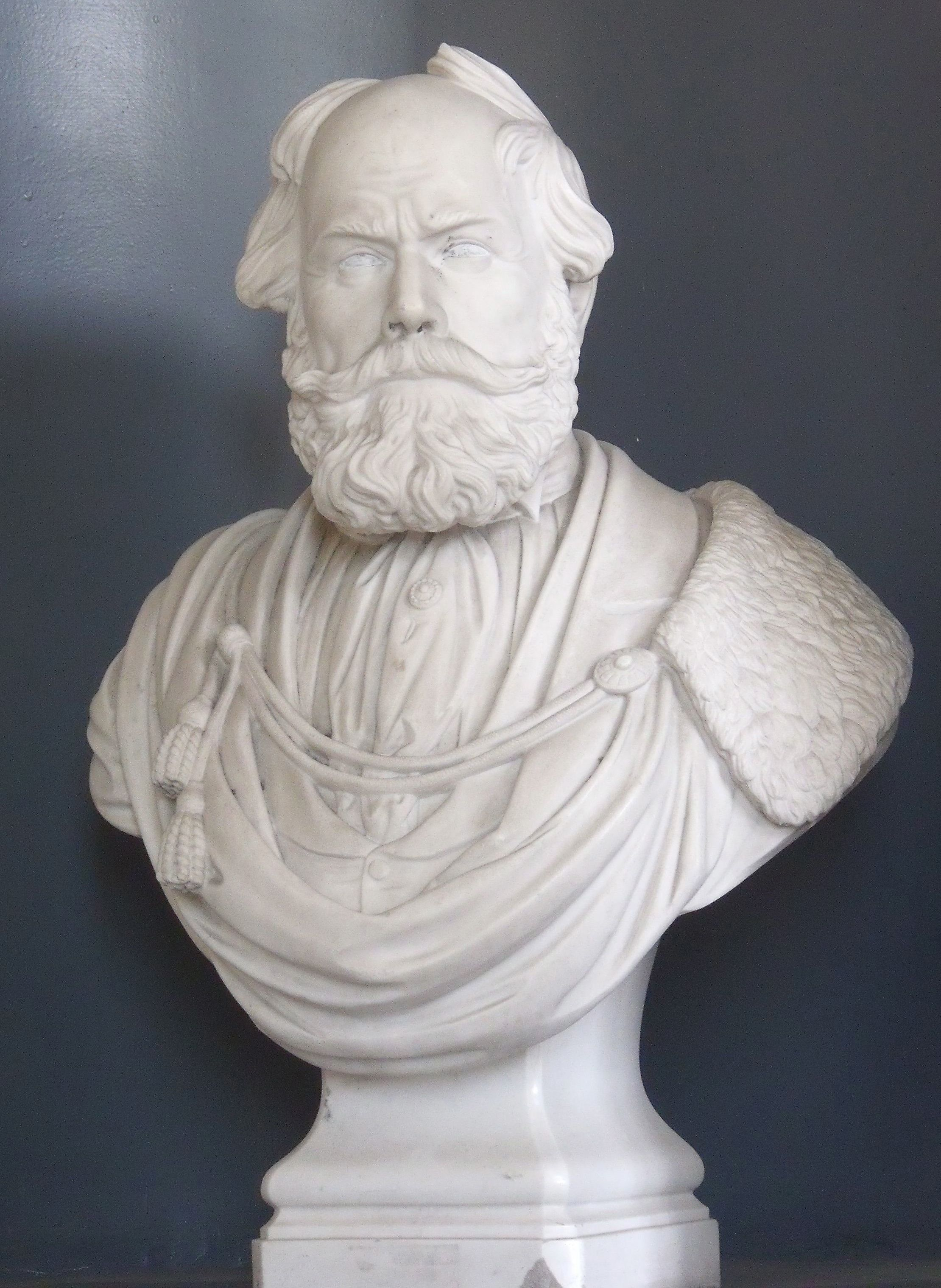
Bust of Sir Hugh Allan

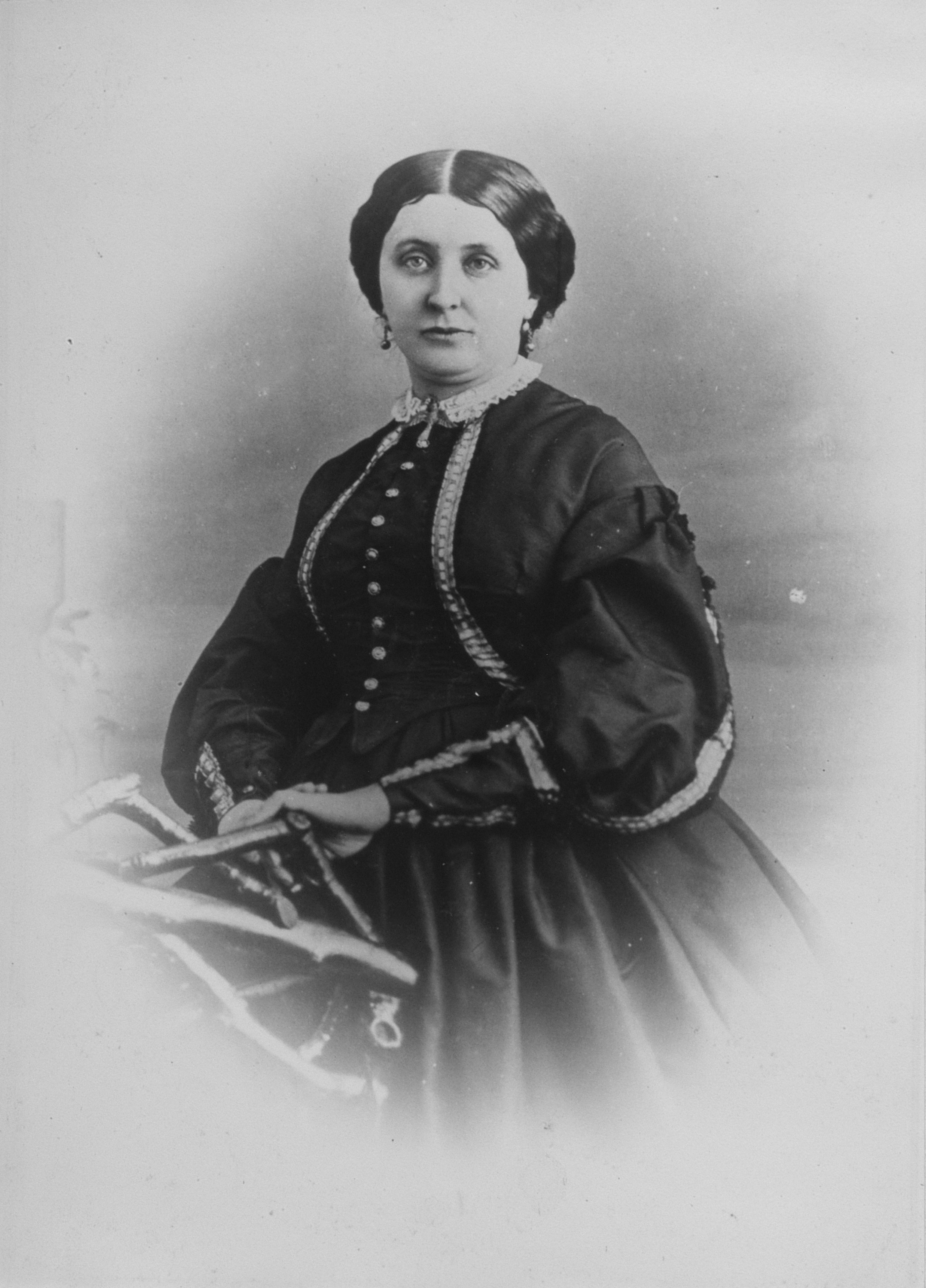
Matilda Caroline Smith, said Lady Allan

In April 1863, when Hugh Allan and his family moved into Ravenscrag, the ballroom, its antechambers and the conservatory had still not been built. There is no precise information on when work began on these rooms. However, an order placed by Hugh Allan around 1863 to the company J. & W. Hilton to furnish the library suggests that construction of the new reception rooms was already underway or about to begin. Firstly, this order confirms the intention to change the purpose of the billiard room, which had just been completed, to a library. Indeed, the custom-made bookcases installed on either side of the fireplace were not originally intended for the room. In the known construction contracts from 1861, there is no mention of a library. However, there is mention of the creation of a billiard room located to the north of the drawing room. Moreover, when Giuseppe Guidicini painted this room, he did not foresee the future addition of bookcases that would hide almost an entire wall. In this regard, in 1993, when the sculpted bookcases were being dismantled in order to present them at a museum exhibition, the workers rediscovered the artist's painted panels at the back. Furthermore, this change of purpose so soon after the construction of the residence shows that there were already plans to move the billiard room to one of the future antechambers to the ballroom. Moreover, an article published on December 7, 1872 in the Canadian Illustrated News confirms this move. This new billiard room is directly accessible "by a door located on the west side [of the drawing room]". Finally, note that the inventory of Hugh Allan's estate carried out on January 10, 1883 confirms the existence of a billiard room between the ballroom and the drawing room. (Note: Notorial Act, minute no. 17456, January 16, 1883, A.N.Q., p. 24) (Note: Notorial Act, minute no. 17456, January 16, 1883, A.N.Q., p. 25)

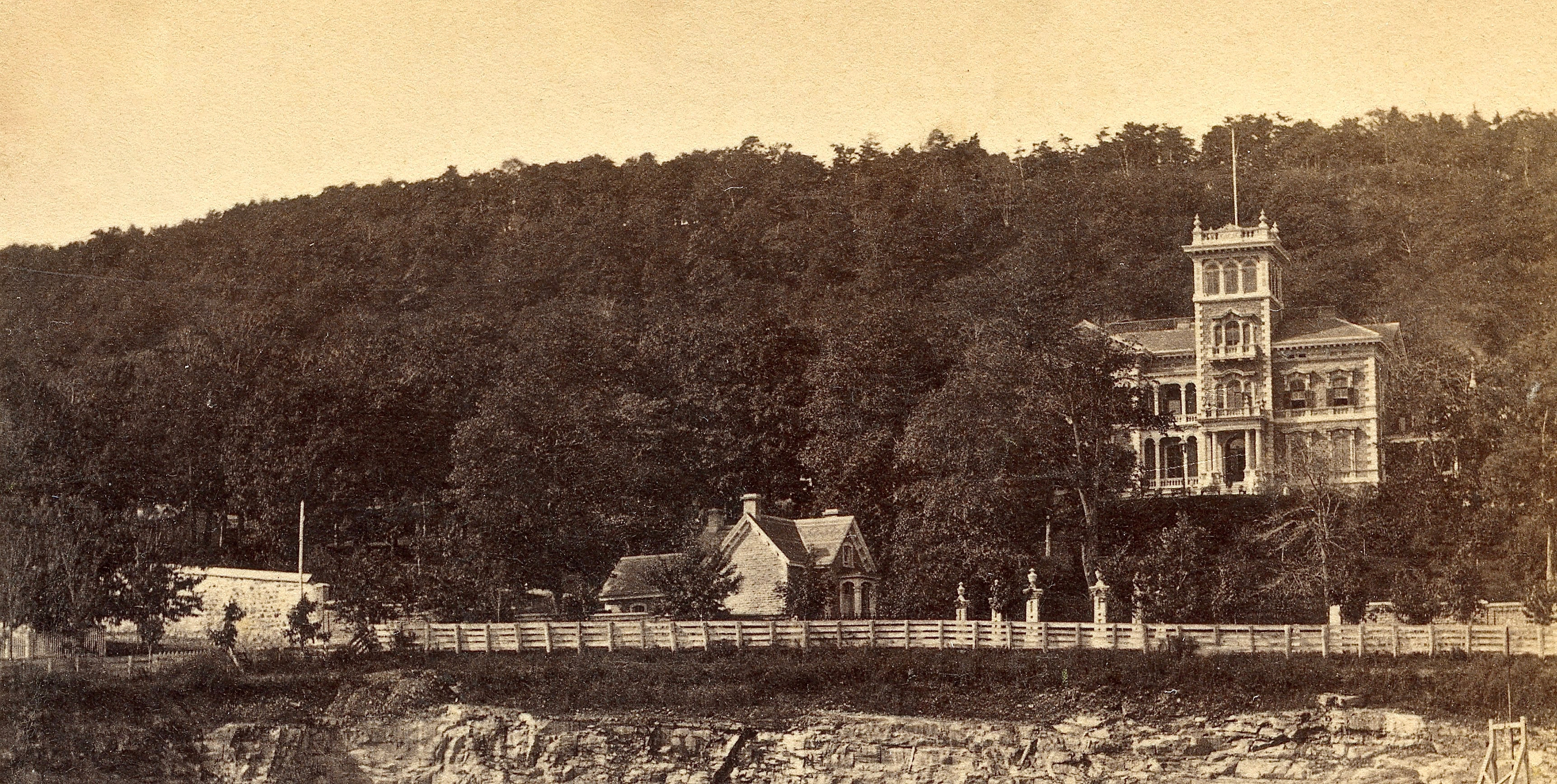
View of Ravenscrag from McTavish Reservoir between 1864 and 1872

In 1865, construction of the reception rooms attached to the main building appears to be underway. In fact, the City of Montreal's property assessment roll report doubled the value of the Ravenscrag estate in 1865 to $200,000 before making a correction and returning it to the initial value of $100,000, suggesting that construction of the reception rooms is underway. It should also be noted that at this time, Hugh Allan's brother, Andrew Allan, was himself having a home built nearby (named "Iononteh"), between McTavish and Peel streets, below Ravenscrag, and that the same architectural firm Hopkins & Wily is superintending both construction sites. In any case, construction of these reception rooms was certainly completed in 1868, as illustrated in an engraving from the period. (Note: Views of Montreal 1868, p. 7 (MacGill College, Montreal)) For these reception rooms, Hugh Allan appears to have used the same contractors employed for the construction of the main building and outbuildings. Indeed, the original building contracts mention the construction of a conservatory which the contractors undertook to build "in accordance with the said general specifications and plans, and to the perfect satisfaction of the said William Spier & Son, and the said Hugh Allan", and on which payment of the contract was dependent. As these reception rooms are situated between the conservatory and the main building, it's therefore highly likely that the same contractors built these rooms, in complete continuity. Furthermore, the similarity in the details of the carved decoration between these adjoining rooms and the main house tends to confirm the use of the same team of sculptors by George Roberts. A notable example is the similarity of the mascarons on the doorways of the ballroom to the mascarons on the pillars of the main staircase, which in both cases stick out their tongues as a teasing gesture or to scare away evil spirits.

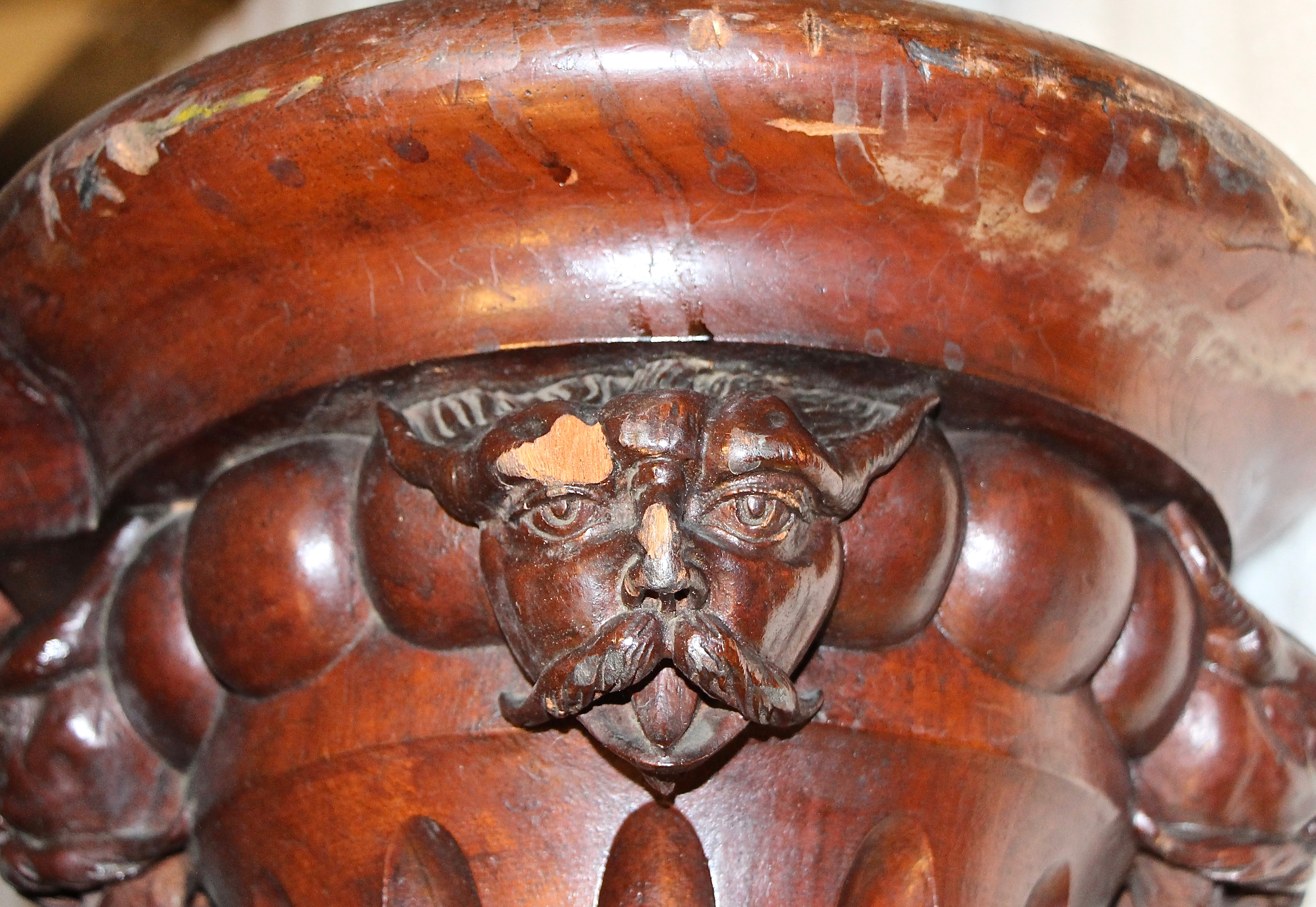
Detail of a mascaron on the baluster of the first floor of the main staircase (1862)

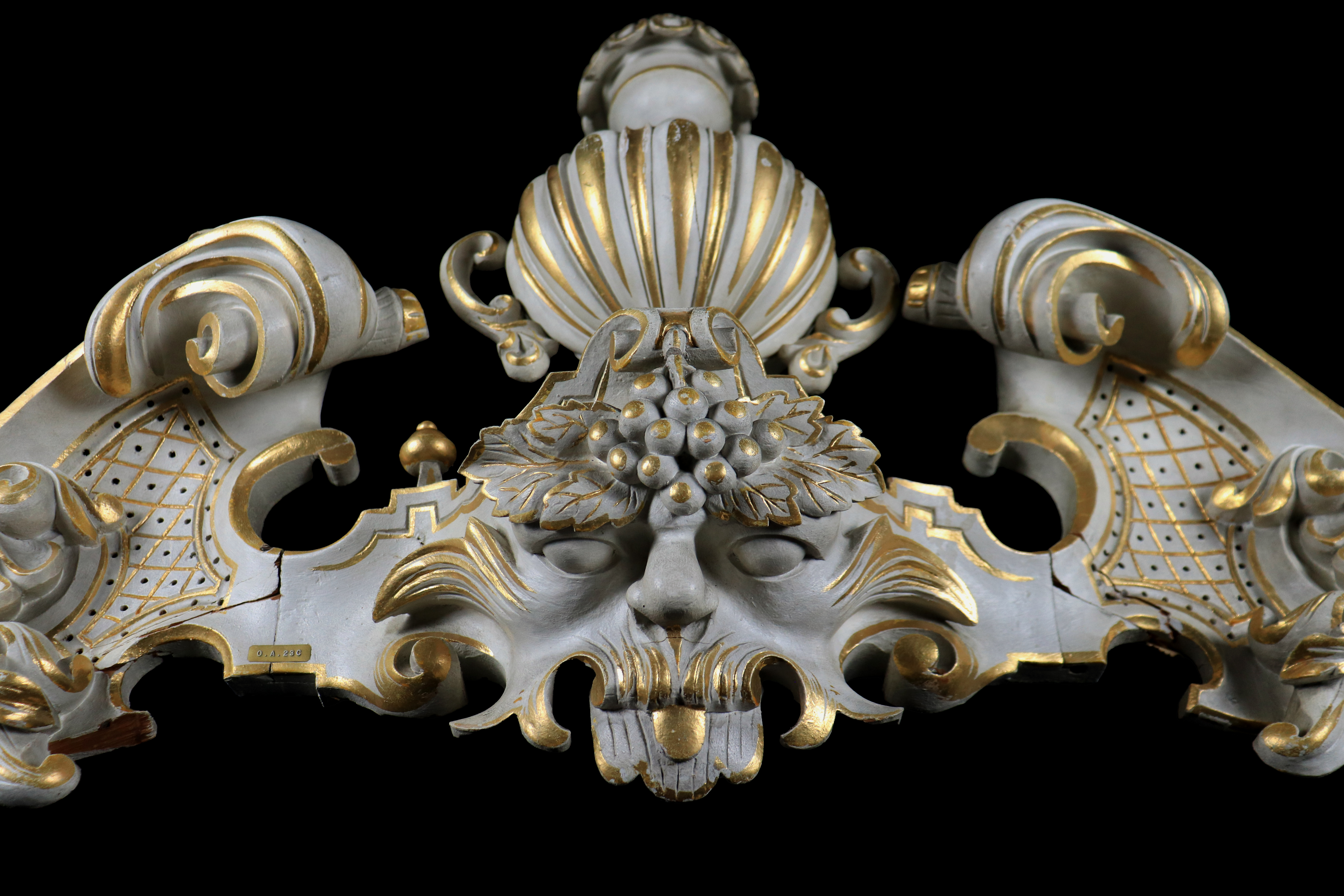
Detail of one of the overdoors of the ballroom (1865)

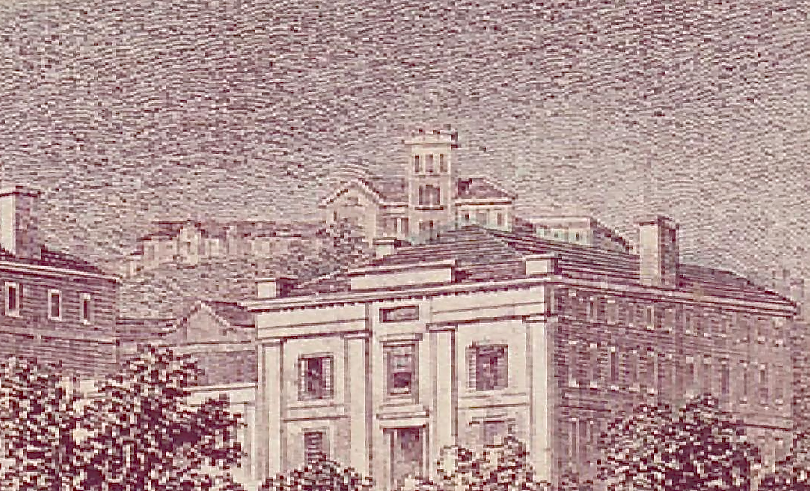
View of Ravenscrag behind the McGill University campus in 1868

On 23 May 1867, Hugh Allan's eldest daughter, Matilda Isobel Allan, married Dr Gibbon of the 25th K.O.B. with the Rev. Dr Matthieson presiding at St. Andrew's Church on Beaver Hall. It is reported that "the wedding party was large and brilliant, and the church was filled with spectators from all quarters." The newspaper does not mention, however, whether this was the occasion on which Hugh Allan inaugurated his brand new ballroom.

In November 1869, Hugh Allan organized a party at Ravenscrag in honor of Prince Arthur of the United Kingdom, future Duke of Connaught and Strathearn (1874) and Governor General of Canada from 1911 to 1916. More than 300 guests were present and it was noted that "such a display of rich clothes has never been seen in Montreal".

In July 1871, Queen Victoria granted Hugh Allan a Knighthood of the United Kingdom of Great Britain and Ireland of the Order of St Michael and St George, as Hugh Allan of Ravenscrag. He was presented to Her Majesty by the Earl of Kimberley in 1873. At this time, Hugh Allan commissioned a marble portrait bust from the company of the marble mason Robert Forsyth, which has been on display at Ravenscrag since 1873, after a brief exhibition in the window of Dawson's store.

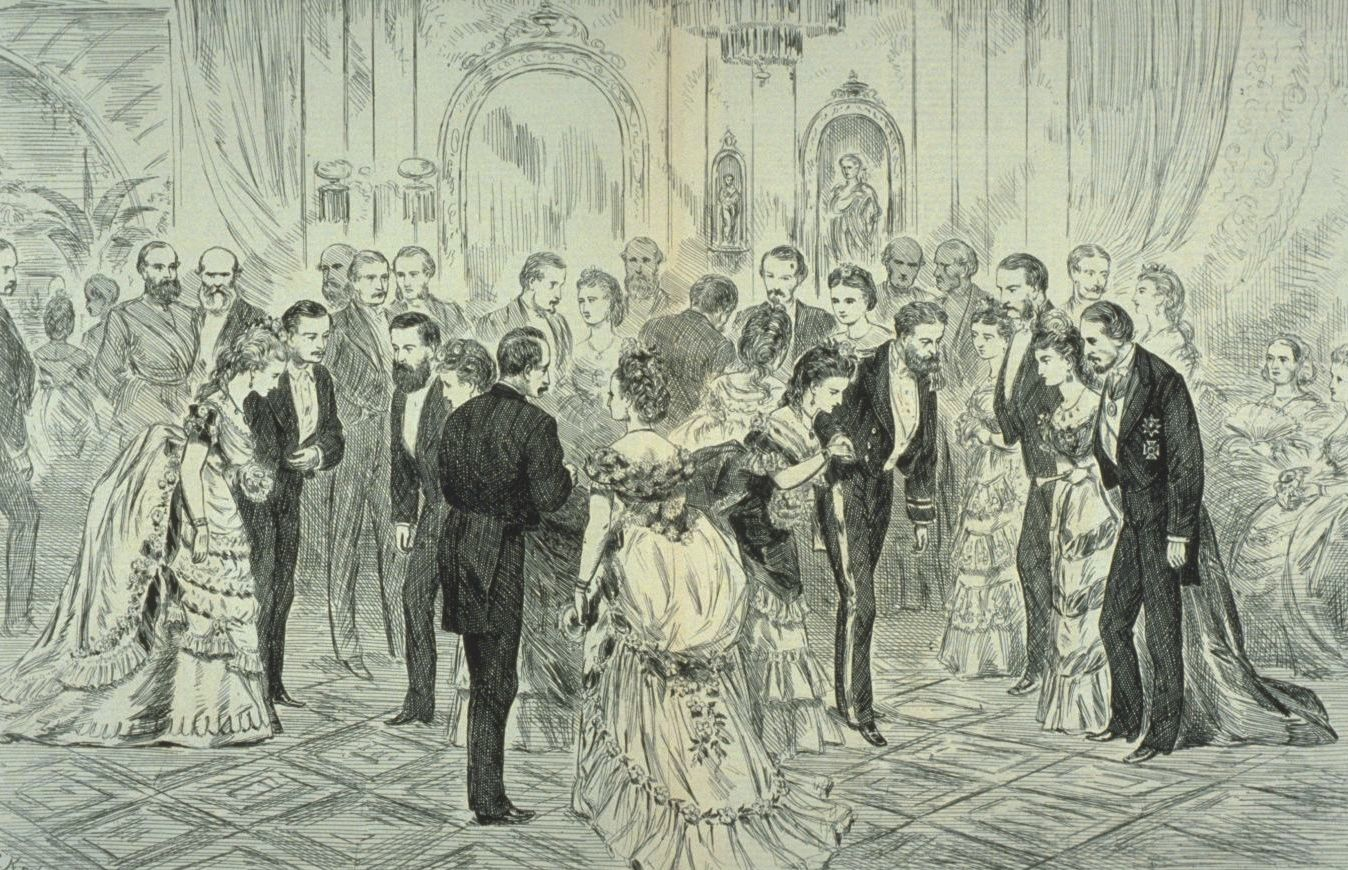
Ball given in honor of the Earl of Dufferin at Ravenscrag (1872)

Between September and November 1872, in preparation for the visit to Montreal of the Earl of Dufferin, 3rd Governor General of Canada, Hugh Allan decided to redecorate the apartment intended for distinguished guests and to enrich the decoration and furniture of the reception rooms, particularly the ballroom. The companies that decorated and furnished the ballroom for this occasion are not known. However, it is possible that Hugh Allan hired the same companies or contractors that had built the Merchants' Bank building in 1867, on the corner of Notre-Dame and Place d'Armes, founded by Hugh Allan among others. Indeed, several of the contractors hired for its construction were those who had also worked on Ravenscrag, including the architectural firm Hopkins & Wily, the masonry contractor Daniel Wilson, the bricklaying contractor Alex Wand, and the cabinetmaker company J. & W. Hilton for the furniture.

Following this logic, the painted works in the ballroom are possibly a creation of John McArthur's painting company, known as McArthur & Son. In addition to having created the painted works in the Merchants' Bank building in 1867, John McArthur also created similar works to those in the ballroom in the past. Indeed, in 1860, he created "circular medallions filled with gold" on the wall panels of the Prince's box in the concert hall, reminiscent of the medallions illustrating profile portraits on a gold background on the ballroom ceiling. Again, in 1866, he painted the ceiling of a store, on the corner of Grand St. James Street and Victoria Square, in a "light blue, enhanced with gilding", similar to the decorations painted on the ceiling of the ballroom.

As for the furniture, the company responsible is also unknown. However, it is highly likely that Hugh Allan ordered his furniture from the cabinetmakers J. & W. Hilton of Montreal. In addition to having produced the furniture for the Merchants' Bank building in 1867, Hugh Allan had already placed at least two orders with this company in the past, namely the complete furnishing of the library in 1863, then a complete bedroom set in 1867. Thus, the windows' gilt cornices and its curtains, designed by Robert Williams, would have come from this company, as well as the armchairs, sofas or large mirrors installed in the niches.

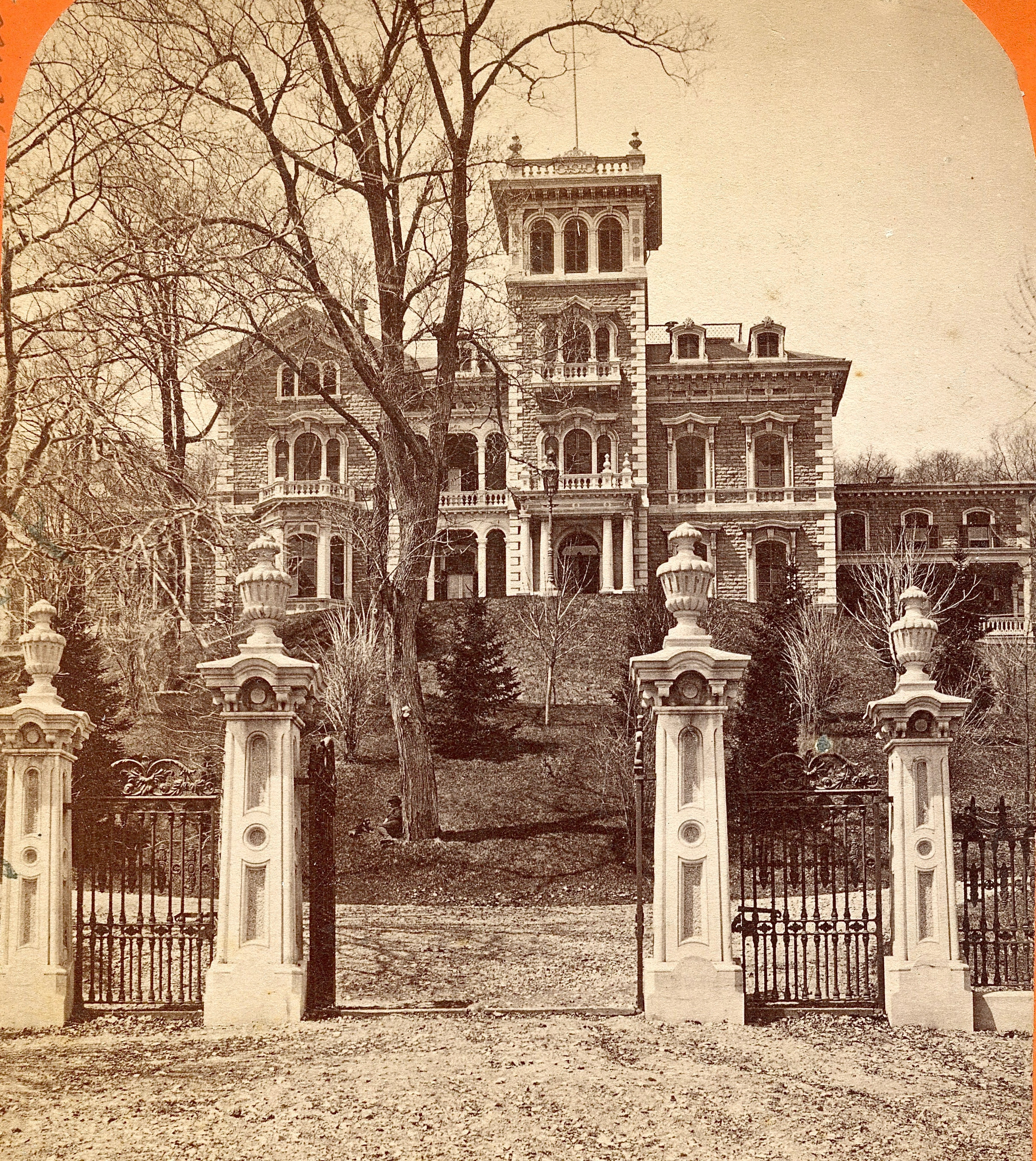
View of Ravenscrag with its dormer windows in the 1870s

On November 21, 1872, three hundred guests attended the ball organized by Hugh Allan in honor of the Earl of Dufferin. The sumptuousness of this event was probably not unrelated to Hugh Allan's interest in the construction of a transcontinental railway line.

Between 1868 and 1872, Hugh Allan had three dormer windows added to the roof of the front facade of the main building to better light the bedrooms on the 3rd floor, intended for his children.

On 9 December 1882, Hugh Allan died suddenly at the age of 72 while on a business trip to Scotland. He was found with his head resting on a hand covering a half-written letter. His body was then repatriated and brought back to Ravenscrag. His coffin was on display in the library.

On December 27, 1882, the funeral began at Ravenscrag and continued at St. Andrew's Church on Beaver Hall. All flags in the city of Montreal were lowered to half-mast and many businesses closed that day to pay their last respects to Hugh Allan. The mayor of Montreal at the time, Jean-Louis Beaudry, and all of his city councillors participated in the funeral march.

=== 1882 to 1940 : Hugh Montagu Allan ===
On Sir Hugh Allan's death in 1882, his son, Hugh Montagu Allan, became heir to Ravenscrag in accordance with his will which stated: "...and it is my desire that my executors shall convey to my son, Hugh Montagu Allan, the house and ground of Ravenscrag and all the furniture". (Note: Registration No. 107815, January 10, 1883, A.N.Q.)

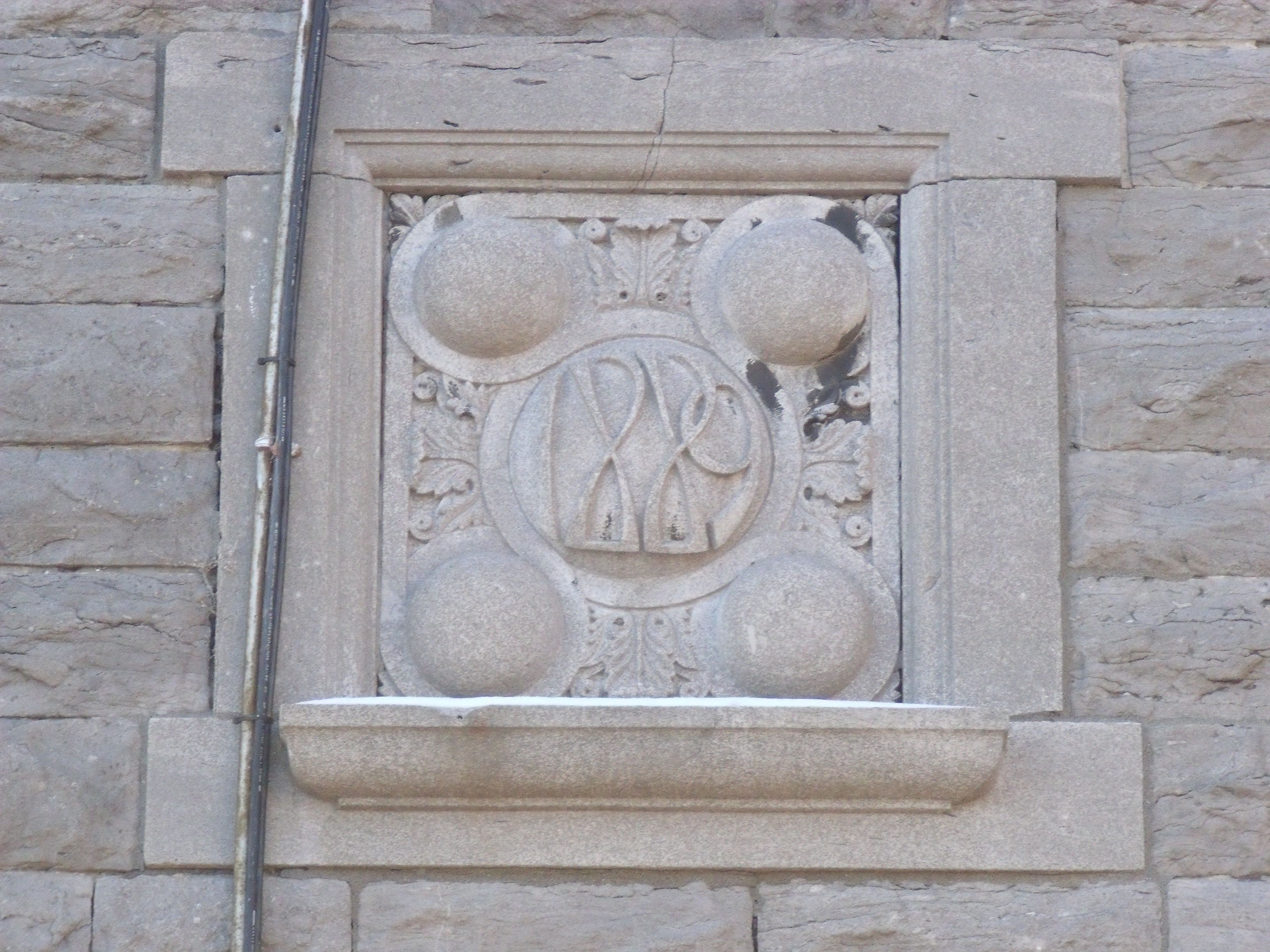
The year of the extension of the servants' wing "1889" engraved in stone

As soon as 1885, Montagu continued the family's tradition of hospitality. On January 23, 1885, he gave a ball that the press called "the social event of the season." The 240 guests came from Montreal high society, but also from Quebec City, New York City and Boston.

On April 21, 1887, in preparation for the construction of the Royal Victoria Hospital, Montagu was invited by the special committee of the City Council set up for the project to seek his opinion on the construction of a hospital building on the edge of his property. Without formally objecting, he stated that "the idea was not a very nice one to have a hospital next to a private house. [...] If a more suitable site could be chosen, I should doubtless prefer it."

On February 25, 1888, Mabel Allan, daughter of Hugh Allan, married Colin Campbell of Mont-Saint-Hilaire at St. Andrew's Church on Beaver Hall, with Reverend Edgar Hill officiating. After the ceremony, the wedding party and their guests proceeded to Ravenscrag where a ball was held.

In 1889, Montagu commissioned architects Andrew Thomas Taylor and George William Gordon to extend the east wing (servants' quarters). An entire third floor was added to this wing.

On October 19, 1889, Montagu hosted members of the Montreal Hunt Club for a luncheon at Ravenscrag.

On September 11, 1890, Isabella Mackenzie, daughter of William Mackenzie and great-granddaughter of Andrew Allan, married Alexander Paterson at St. Paul's Church on Dorchester Boulevard. After the ceremony, the wedding party and their guests proceeded to Ravenscrag for a reception. Also, on August 19, 1891, Margaret Allan, the fifth daughter of Sir Hugh Allan, married Dr. Charles McEachran, a veterinary surgeon, at Ravenscrag, officiated by the Reverend Edgar Hill. Then, on September 21, 1892, Edith Allan, also a daughter of Sir Hugh Allan, married J. T. Routledge of Pincher Creek at St. Andrew's Church on Beaver Hall, followed by a reception at Ravenscrag.

On January 16, 1893, Arthur Allan, Montagu's brother and the youngest son of Sir Hugh Allan, died of asphyxiation in a fire that broke out in the building where he resided on Dorchester Boulevard. His body was then returned to Ravenscrag where it was examined by the coroner. His funeral was held in the drawing room on January 18, 1893, presided over by the Reverend Edgar Hill.

On July 10, 1893, Hugh Montagu Allan and Marguerite Ethel Mackenzie announced their engagement. They were married on October 19 at Christ Church in Montreal, officiated by Reverend Pastor Dr. Morton, assisted by the Very Reverend Dean Norman of Quebec City. The wedding was hailed as "the most splendid social event to have taken place in Montreal in many years."

On July 18, 1894, Ravenscrag was targeted by burglars who stole $300 worth of jewelry, according to the estate's caretaker, Mr. Dunbar.

On August 5, 1894, Martha Allan, the couple's first child, was born in Ravenscrag.

On the night of December 31, 1894, to January 1, 1895, the Allan couple held their traditional New Year's Eve ball. The orchestra was conducted by Mr. Gruen, and more than twenty waltzes were played throughout the evening and night. All of Montreal's high society was in attendance.

On February 5, 1895, Marguerite Mackenzie-Allan gave a dinner in honor of Elizabeth Bridget Nagle, Baroness of Shaughnessy.

An article in the Montreal Daily Herald on January 18, 1896, reported the alarm raised by some superintendents of the City's drinking water supply facilities about the poor condition of the masonry of the McTavish Reservoir and the Ravenscrag Reservoir, which was causing leaks that could damage the buildings next to them, including Ravenscrag and the McGill University buildings.

On October 26, 1896, Hugh II Allan, the couple's second child and first son, was born in Ravenscrag.

In 1898, Montagu asked architects Andrew Thomas Taylor and George William Gordon to enlarge the stable to accommodate Thoroughbred horses. He also asked his architects to make several modifications to the residence. On the one hand, on the outside, the portico was closed and joined to the vestibule, the dining room was enlarged by about 3 metres (about ten feet) and, because of a privileged view of the city and the St. Lawrence River, many balconies and terraces were created on the front façade, notably on the roof of the dining room and the old portico. Finally, the dormers on either side of the tower were lowered to pierce the cornice, as in the William Dow house. On this occasion, the Wighton & Morison Co. is responsible for the masonry. On the other hand, inside, the old school room is joined to the entrance hall and converted into a small living room. Four columns identical to the two pre-existing columns are added to the entrance hall. The walls of the vestibule, the entrance hall and the dining room are covered with tapestries. On this occasion, the company of the decorator Walter P. Scott is responsible for all the painting, gilding, installation of tapestries and cabinetry/carpentry work. Hubertus McGuire, an employee of this company, is particularly responsible for supervising and carrying out the cabinetry/carpentry work. Although these works were planned in 1898, it seems that they were carried out rather in 1899: the architect Andrew T. Taylor, who was responsible for supervising the Ravenscrag site, was also responsible for supervising the construction site of Montrose at Cacouna, the new summer residence of Hugh Montagu Allan, which he visited in August 1899.

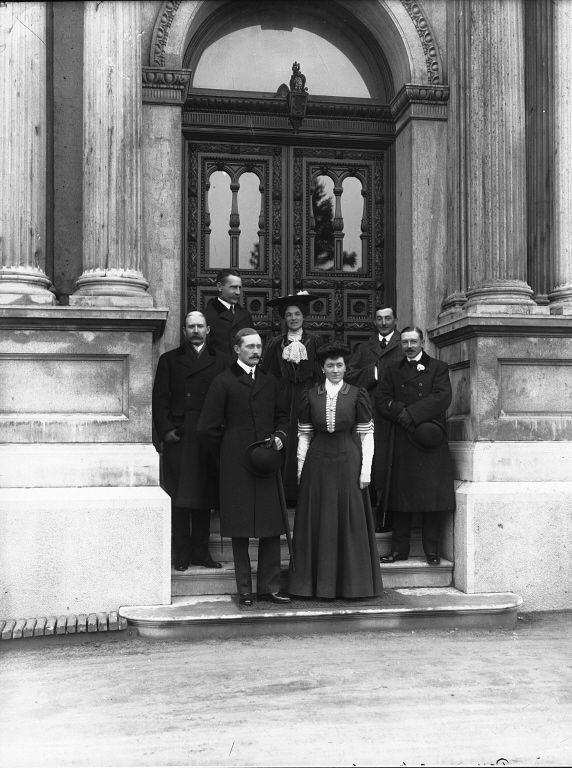
Prince Arthur of Connaught during his visit to Montreal, Ravenscrag (1906)

On Saturday, March 30, 1901, under the auspices of Mrs. Allan, a bazaar was organized in Ravenscrag to benefit the Foundling and Babies Hospital. Later, in May 1901, Mr. and Mrs. Bryce Allan of Boston stayed in Ravenscrag for the Montreal Horse Show.

On May 21, 1902, the Allans organized a garden party to benefit the Foundling and Sick Baby Hospital. Several activities were offered: Chinese lanterns, live music and dancing, tea tasting, a ping-pong tournament, farm animals, pony rides for children, a weighing machine, and an auction of works by artists such as W. Hope and W. Brymner, alcoholic beverages (Scotch), golf equipment, Shetland lace shawls, and even candy. Several prominent Montreal families, including the Molson family, lent their support to the event.

During the summer of 1902, Montagu Allan had the conservatory of the residence rebuilt and enlarged by the company Lord & Burnham Co. of Toronto.

On May 13, 1904, Governor General Albert Grey visited Montreal for the Horse Show. He dined at the Allan's home in Ravenscrag during his visit.

In May 1906, the Allan family welcomed Prince Arthur of Connaught to Ravenscrag. A ball was held in his honour on May 8, 1906 at the residence.

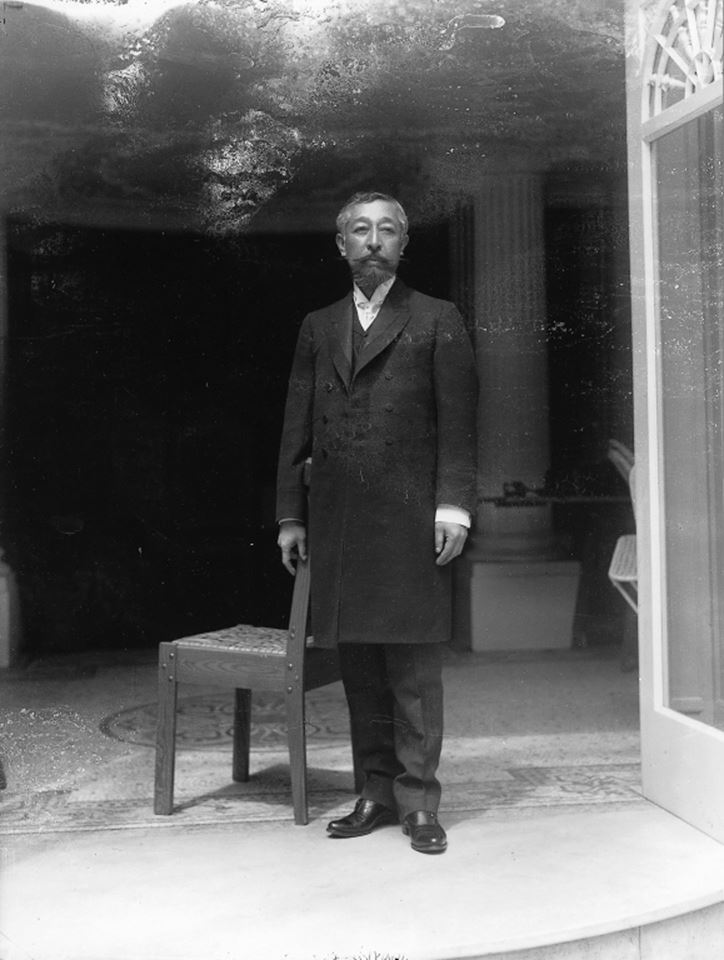
Prince Fushimi Hiroyasu during his visit to Montreal, Ravenscrag (1907)

In 1907, Sir Hugh Montagu Allan received Prince Fushimi Hiroyasu, brother of the emperor of Japan, at Ravenscrag and was in charge of his entertainment during his visit to Montreal. This visit earned him his investiture in the Order of the Rising Sun.

In September 1908, the Sheffield Choir took up residence at Ravenscrag during their visit to Montreal, at the invitation of the Allans.

In January 1913, Ravenscrag became the temporary residence of the Duke of Connaught, his daughter, Princess Patricia, and their entourage due to the Duchess of Connaught's hospitalization at the Royal Victoria Hospital. The royal standard flew atop Ravenscrag Tower. They left Ravenscrag around January 15th to stay at James Ross's house on Peel Street.

In December 1913, while Hugh Montagu was in England, Lady Allan organized a costume ball in honor of her son, Hugh II, for the holiday season. The young ladies dressed as servants, while the young men donned the uniforms of French chefs. The reception rooms at Ravenscrag were decorated in red and green.

During the week of January 3, 1915, Lady Allan gave a "young men's ball" in honor of Miss Gwen Allan, Miss Anna Allan and Mr. Hugh II Allan at Ravenscrag. All the invited officer cadets and soldiers were in uniform.

On May 7, 1915, Montagu and his wife Margaret's two youngest daughters, Anna and Gwendolyn, perished in the sinking of the RMS Lusitania. Later, in 1917, during World War I, their only son, Hugh Allan II, was killed in action. Of their four children, only their eldest daughter, Margaret Martha, remained. Life at Ravenscrag then became "more austere." Receptions became less frequent after these tragic events that befell the Allan family.

After five years of absence, Lady Allan returned to Ravenscrag the week of October 4, 1919 with her husband Hugh Montagu and their daughter Martha.

In January 1920, the Allans received a visit at Ravenscrag from Lieutenant-Colonel Kenric-Rudolphus Marshall, C.M.G., D.S.O., and his wife. Hugh Montagu was sixty years old in 1920, and his only child, Marguerite Martha, was pursuing a career as an actress and playwright. This profession often required her to travel and be away from home for several months each year. Furthermore, maintaining such a residence was becoming increasingly expensive for the elderly couple. They rented Ravenscrag "to wealthy visitors for varying periods of time." Marguerite Martha also occasionally used the ballroom as a theatre, where she gathered young English- and French-speaking actors, including Gratien Gélinas, to practice her craft. (Note: Rémillard 2016, p. 199)

On June 11, 1921, Lady Allan gave a ball in honor of Lord and Lady Harlington and their guests, Sir Frederich Orr-Levis (president of the Canadian Vickers Ltd. company) and Miss Orr-Lewis.

On June 2, 1926, Ravenscrag hosted a reception following the marriage of Marguerite Evelyn, daughter of Mrs. E.A. Bearmore of Montreal, to Dr. E. Thorburn Cleveland, son of Dr. and Mrs. E. T. Cleveland, at St. Jax Church in Montreal.

On June 15, 1926, Julian Byng, 1st Viscount Byng of Vimy, and his wife, hosted a dinner at Ravenscrag during their stay in Montreal.

On October 30, 1930, Lady Allan hosted the debutante ball at Ravenscrag in honor of Miss Barbara Cowans and Miss Rosanna Todd.

On July 3, 1931, Ravenscrag became the temporary official residence of the Governor-General, his wife the Countess of Bessborough, and their entourage for the remainder of the summer season.

On August 14, 1931, Lady Bessborough gave birth to her fourth child, a boy, at the Royal Victoria Hospital while the Governor General (9th Earl of Bessborough) and his entourage were staying at Ravenscrag. It was at Ravenscrag that Lord Bessborough received congratulations from King George V and Canadian Prime Minister Richard Bedford Bennett on the birth of his son. An opening was made in the east wall of the residence to allow Lord Bessborough access to the Royal Victoria Hospital without having to travel along Pine Avenue. Although unconfirmed, the King and Queen of Siam may have stayed at Ravenscrag during their visit to Canada around this time. On August 31, 1931, the Governor General announced from Ravenscrag that his newborn son would be christened "George St. Lawrence Neuflize" at St. Bartholomew's Church in Ottawa on September 22, 1931.

Over the years, the house no longer met the needs of the old couple and the modern world. In addition, the Second World War was upon Ravenscrag and Hugh Montagu was faced with a potential property tax of fifty thousand dollars ($50,000) per year. He and Lady Allan decided to move to an apartment in the Le Château Apartments building on Sherbrooke Street in 1938. When the war broke out in 1939, the couple immediately offered Ravenscrag to the Canadian government with the intention of serving as a convalescent home for war victims. However, as the government did not know what to do with it, the couple decided in 1940 to offer it to the Royal Victoria Hospital instead.

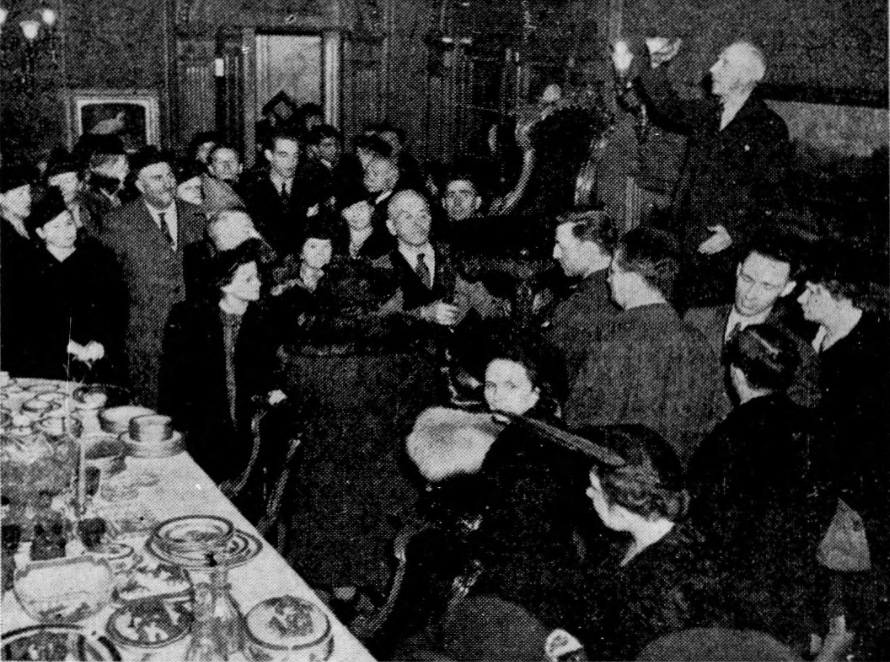
The auction on November 18, 1940 in the dining room of Ravenscrag

On November 18 and 19, 1940, Hugh Montague put the residence's furniture up for auction: the auctioneer, Fraser Bros Ltd, sold, among other things, hunting trophies in the form of antelope heads mounted on wall sconces, candelabra supported by life-size caryatids, long hallway carpets, and elephants carved in ivory and ebony. “The scene took on the appearance of an auction in a blockbuster movie.” Statues, paintings, carpets, and bedding were sold following “lively” bidding wars. Several of the pieces of furniture for sale were of surprising sizes: “[…] wardrobes larger than any standard room in a private city home, a kitchen table longer than any table you might find in a restaurant, more than five bathtubs that could have held several people at once […], refrigeration equipment more spacious than the average one found in any store, […].” Even the residence's internal telephone system, linking together the butler's room, stables, cloakroom, bedrooms, sewing room, conservatory, caretaker's cottage and tennis court, was up for sale. The day of the auction was marked by snow and wet weather, and dead leaves littered the conservatory floor, marking the sad end of the Allan's glorious home. On 19 November 1940, Hugh Montagu Allan donated Ravenscrag to the Royal Victoria Hospital (Note: Notorial Act, minute no. 488283, November 19, 1940, R.F.Q.) (Note: Online land registry, pp. Lot 1800–1 (St. Antoine Ward, City of Montreal)) Their only daughter, Martha Allan, died two years later, on 4 April 1942, leaving the couple without an heir.

=== 1940 to 2021 : Allan Memorial Institute ===
On November 19, 1940, the Royal Victoria Hospital received Ravenscrag estate as a gift from Hugh Montagu Allan. For nearly three years, the hospital was undecided as to the eventual use of the former mansion. The hospital even considered destroying the residence to replace it with a new building. It was not until 1943 that the hospital decided to transform it into a department dedicated to psychiatry, the first of its kind in Canada. From then on, major changes were made to the interior of the house in order to better serve the new purpose of the new department. Between 1943 and 1944, the Royal Victoria Hospital commissioned architects Harold Lawson and H. B. Little to almost completely redo the interior of the residence and the stables; only a wall of the old library and the vestibule of the house remained visible and intact On this occasion, the institute offered to the École du meuble de Montréal (School of Cabinetmaking of Montreal) most of the easily removable interior decorations (cabinets, shelves, doors, door frames, etc.), "which accepted them eagerly". In 1945, all the balconies and terraces were destroyed and the balcony adjacent to the dining room was closed off by walls. In addition, the greenhouse was removed that same year.

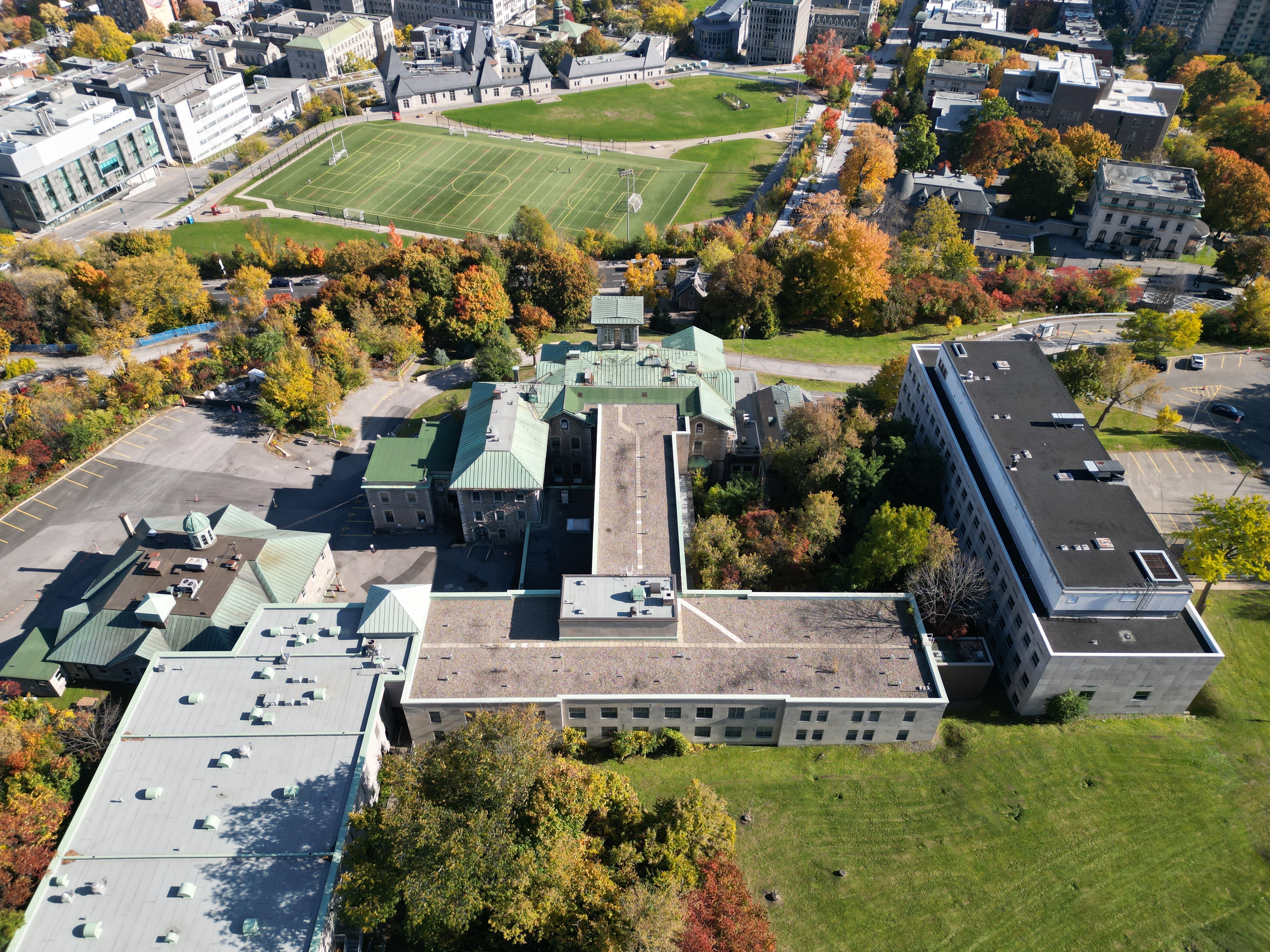
The T-shaped rear annex (built in 1953) at the Allan Memorial Institute

In the 1940s, the former mansion was renamed the Allan Memorial Institute in honor of the Allan family. The institute opened its doors on July 12, 1944. (Note: Pinard 1987, p. 178) It then had about fifty rooms, four laboratories and offices for administration and staff. (Note: Pinard 1987, p. 179) The first director of the institute was Dr. Donald Ewen Cameron, until then a professor of psychiatry at McGill University.

Around 1951, the institute was still confined to the old residence and its former stable, which quickly became overcrowded. Several members of the institute had small offices mainly located in the basement of the house, which at that time housed the entire psychology department. Between 1952 and 1953, the institute commissioned architects E. I. Barrot, L. E. Marshall, R. A. Montgomery, and J. C. Merrett to build a T-shaped annex to extend the residence to the rear The construction of a new wing made of Queenston limestone increased the institute's capacity to 250 beds. This new wing was inaugurated on October 10, 1953.

Further interior modifications to the former residence took place in the basement during the construction of the rear addition between 1952 and 1953. In the western section of the basement, several new rooms were created, including offices, an electronics shop, a machine shop, and a room for the second psychophysiology laboratory. In the eastern section of the basement, the former laundry room, a large tiled room, was divided into three offices to accommodate the clinical psychology staff. (Note: Sourkes 1995, p. 142) Toward the end of the 1950s, one of the basement offices was converted into an animal testing laboratory. A metalwork company was contracted to fabricate the animal cages and the ventilation duct system connecting the basement to the outside through the roof. The laboratory was also equipped for performing surgeries, histology, and data storage.

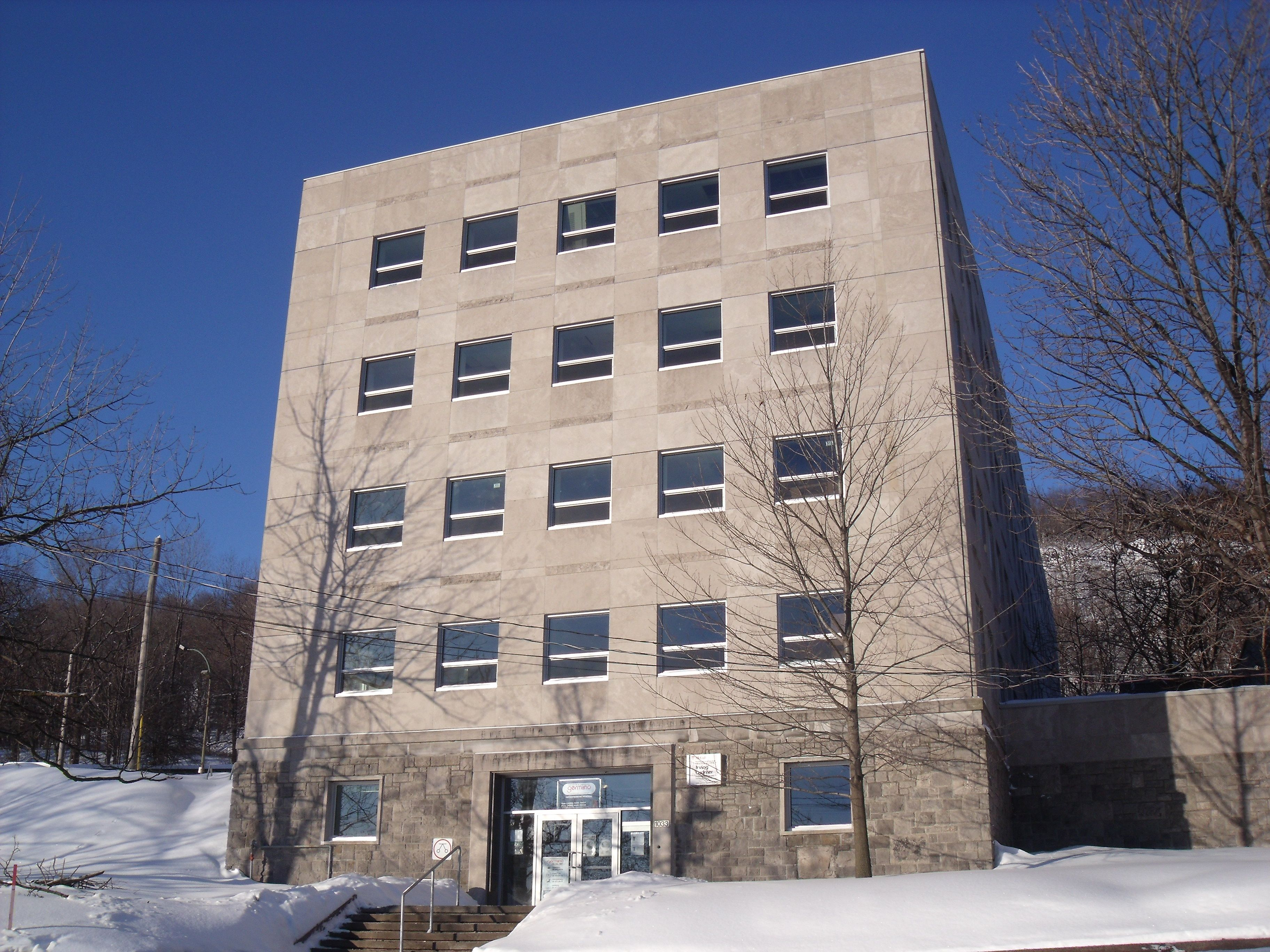
Irving Ludmer Pavilion (built in 1963)

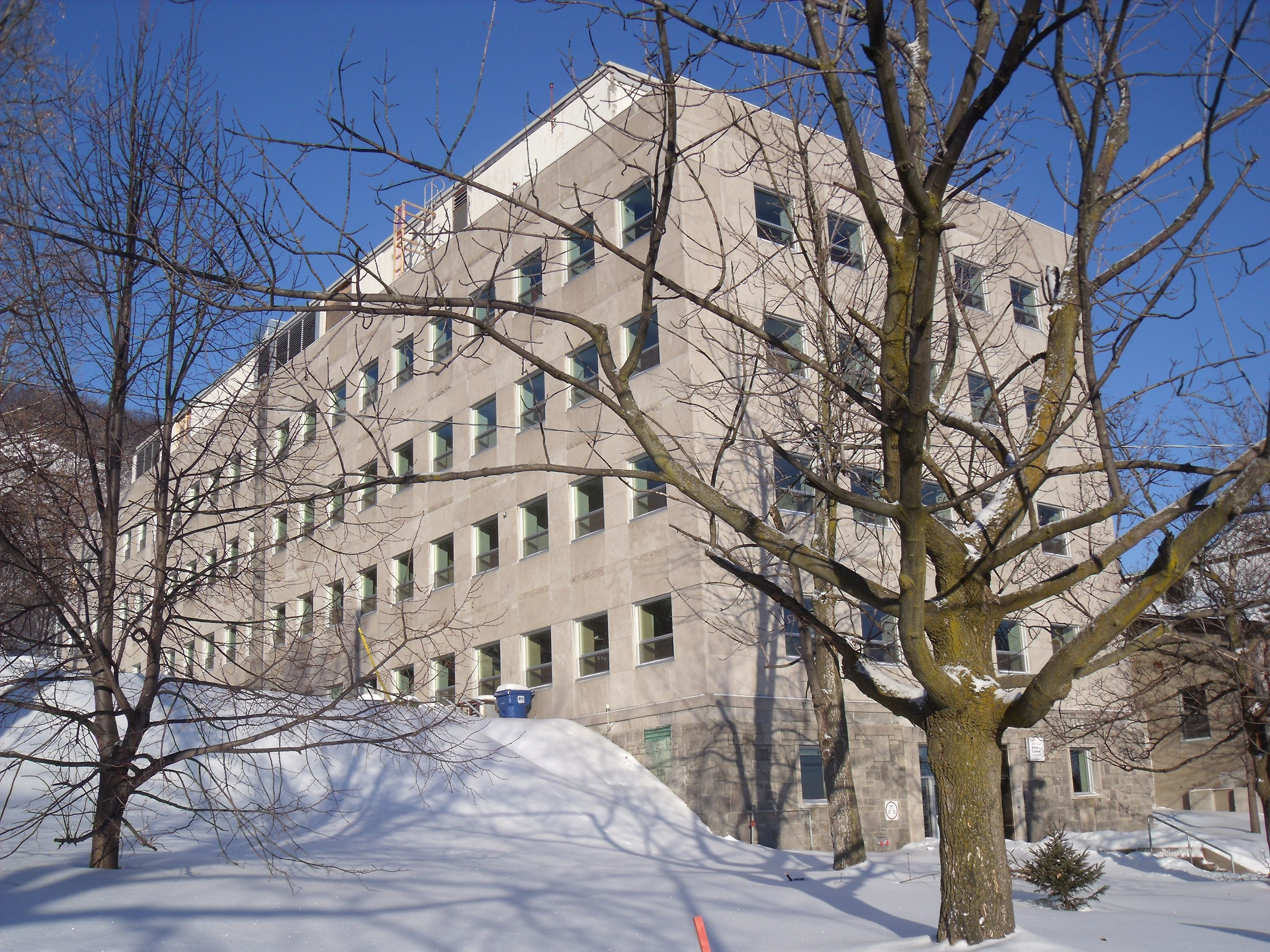
Irving Ludmer Pavilion (built in 1963)

Around 1960, the idea arose to build a new annex for teaching and research for McGill University's Department of Psychiatry. Despite the construction of the rear annex a few years earlier and modifications to the old residence, the institute's members faced significant problems: in particular, numerous pipes attached to the ceilings carrying hot water raised the room temperatures so high that staff had to combat the heat with air conditioners running year-round. Furthermore, the animal experimentation laboratory was smaller than the institution's needs. Dr. Cameron successfully convinced McGill University's Principal, Frank Cyril James, of the merits of the new building. Plans for a new annex were then drawn up and presented to the McGill Building Programme Committee. These plans were subject to last-minute changes before their presentation to the committee: an entire floor was removed, as the allocated budget could not cover its construction. The building cost nearly $1,600,000, with the funds coming mainly from the Quebec government, but also from a significant donation from Irving Ludmer, "a great benefactor of his time and country, whose generous gift was the decisive factor in the university giving high priority to the construction of this building." (Note: Sourkes 1995, p. 185)

On November 13, 1963, the new pavilion named "Irving Ludmer" of the Allan Memorial Institute was officially inaugurated by Governor General Georges Vanier and his wife Pauline Archer in the presence of Principal and Vice-Chancellor Rocke Robertson of McGill University. Laboratory demonstrations were on the program. (Note: Sourkes 1995, p. 145) Governor General Georges Vanier unveiled the commemorative plaque marking its opening, inscribed: “This building, dedicated to the study of human behavior and its disorders and to the teaching of those who shall devote themselves to the conquest of mental illness, was opened on november 13th, 1963 by Major-General the Right Honourable Georges P. Vanier, D.S.O., M.C., D.C., Governor-General of Canada.” (Note: Sourkes 1995, p. 187) The building was then opened to the public, with all four and a half floors accessible. Its opening coincided with the twentieth anniversary of the Allan Memorial Psychiatric Research Institute. The official evening was preceded by a lecture on November 12, 1963. (Note: This conference focuses on these topics and authors : "Gates of Excellence" by Kenneth E. Appel, "Certain Aspects of the Relation of Biochemistry to Psychiatry" by Seymour S. Kety, "Psychiatry’s Responsabilities : University and Community" by James S. Tyhurst, "Neurology and Psychiatry : Two Solitudes ?" by Herbert Jasper and "Personality Theories and Recent Evidence" by J. McV, Hunt.) A banquet was planned for the evening at the Redpath Hall. (Note: Sourkes 1995, p. 186)

Since research is the primary function of the new complex, the building is named the "Irving Ludmer Psychiatry Research and Training Pavilion" rather than simply the "Training and Research Pavilion." The lecture and practical work rooms on the ground floor, as well as the viewing room on the fourth floor, play a key role in the teaching activities conducted by its members. The offices of the Department of Psychiatry occupy a corner of the first floor.

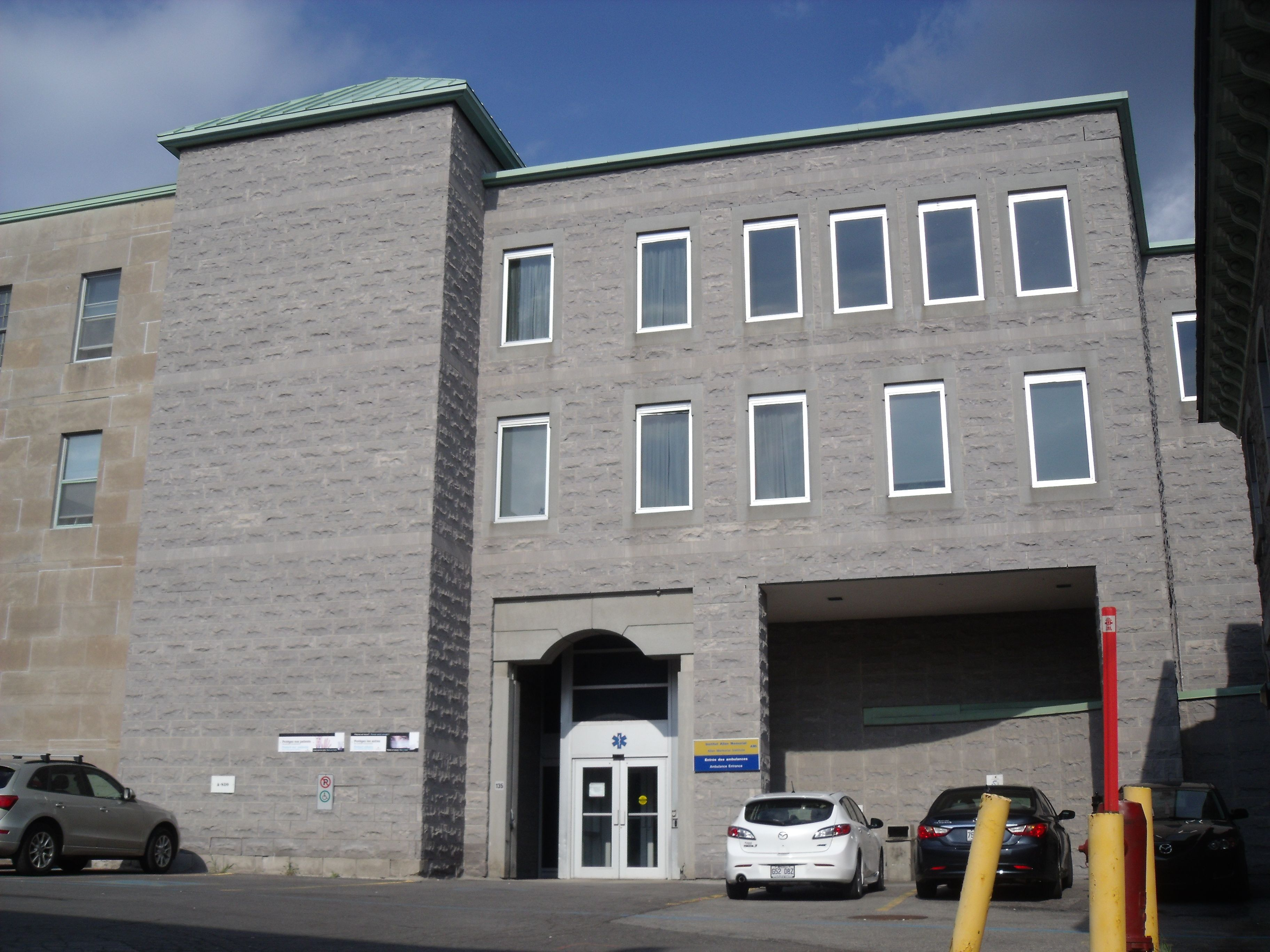
Annex added in 1986

In 1986, the institute built a new annex "in order to offer a more comprehensive range of psychiatric care" and increased the institute's capacity by twenty beds.

On December 15, 1987, the City of Montreal declared by regulation that the Ravenscrag estate is an integral part of the “site patrimonial du Mont-Royal” (Mount Royal heritage site). (Note: Règlement no. 7593, Ville de Mtl)

After more than a century of existence, wear and tear, and exposure to the elements, the old residence and grounds are beginning to show their age. The paint on the cornice is peeling in several places, the rosettes on the coffered ceiling of the vestibule have come loose and fallen, and the decorative elements of the monumental double entrance doors, such as the carved lions and cherubs, have fallen or broken. In the 1980s, the Allan Memorial Institute Development Fund organized a fundraising campaign that financed the restoration of part of the stables between 1980 and 1990, the entrance doors in 1991, and the vestibule and entrance hall of the residence, which began between 1992 and 1993. In 1993, another fundraising campaign was held to mark, among other things, the fiftieth anniversary of the institute's founding. A gala evening took place at Place des Arts on November 14, 1993, bringing together four of the greatest guitarists of the moment: Joe Pass (jazz), Leo Kottke (folk guitar), Pepe Romero (classical guitar) and Paco Peña (flamenco guitar).

In July 1997, the official creation of the McGill University Health Centre (MUHC) was announced, merging the Montreal Children's Hospital, the Royal Victoria Hospital (including the Allan Memorial Institute), the Montreal General Hospital, the Montreal Neurological Institute and Hospital and the Montreal Chest Institute.

On September 28, 1998, the planned relocation of the Royal Victoria Hospital to the new McGill University Health Centre (MUHC) site near the Vendôme station, scheduled for 2003 or 2004, was announced. The future of the Royal Victoria Hospital properties, including Ravenscrag, became uncertain. On November 5, 1998, MUHC officials announced that "three of the four current MUHC facilities—the General Hospital, the Montreal Children's Hospital, and the Royal Victoria Hospital—will be converted for residential (condos) and commercial (office) purposes." Specifically, the Royal Victoria Hospital buildings would be converted into "luxury condos," following the suggestion of architectural and urban planning firms hired by the MUHC in 1997 for the redevelopment of these buildings.

In 1999, McGill University, which was at the time looking for potential spaces to acquire or lease in order to meet the need for space related to the growing number of students in the coming decades, became interested in the properties of the Royal Victoria Hospital, which was scheduled to move in 2003 or 2004. Ravenscrag in particular became a possible location for a new university pavilion. However, the cost of transforming the hospital buildings and the residence hindered the adoption of such a project.

In May 2000, a thesis by four MBA students at UQAM challenged the McGill University Health Centre's (MUHC) plan to convert the Royal Victoria Hospital properties into luxury condominiums. Regarding Ravenscrag, the students proposed instead "transforming the Allan Memorial Institute, formerly Ravenscrag, Montreal's finest 19th-century property, into a Relais & Châteaux on Mount Royal. This would allow the public to dine in a panoramic restaurant just 50 meters from Olmsted Road."

On May 25, 2000, the newspaper Le Devoir reported on the lack of maintenance of McGill University properties, including several of the converted former mansions in the Golden Square Mile. It specifically mentioned that "the Gate House of Sir Hugh Allan's Ravenscrag residence is in a terrible state."

On November 8, 2000, the McGill University Health Centre (MUHC) announced it would hold a public consultation on the future of the Royal Victoria Hospital's land and buildings following its planned relocation in 2005. This consultation took place on January 15 and 16, 2001, under the direction of an independent committee composed of lawyers Roy L. Heenan and Michel Yergeau, and Senator Joan Fraser. They submitted their report in April 2001 (Note: Heenan, Fraser et Yergeau 2001). Regarding the Allan Memorial Institute's buildings and land, they notably recommended:

that any reuse of these buildings be designed to ensure better accessibility and permeability between the city and the park. This can be achieved by adding public access points through the development of pedestrian and cycling paths, signage, and by returning to the park certain areas currently occupied by parking lots [...] which will become additional green spaces. It goes without saying that no project should be authorized on these lands, nor any addition that would increase the physical and visual barriers between the park and the city.

On March 9, 2005, the Quebec government created the "Site patrimonial du Mont-Royal" (Mount Royal Heritage Site) by decree. (Note: Gazette officielle du Québec 2005, p. 963) Under this decree, the Ravenscrag Estate is part of this protected area. (Note: Gazette officielle du Québec 2005, p. 967)

In May 2006, the Royal Victoria Hospital received notice from the City of Montreal to temporarily remove approximately fifty parking spaces along a retaining wall that was in danger of collapsing, while the protected wall underwent repairs. According to Antonin Bouchard, then the hospital's project engineer, "the retaining wall, which requires nearly a million dollars in repairs, is [...] far down the institution's list of priorities. [...] So, we decided to convert a grassy area [belonging to the Allan Memorial Institute] into a parking lot." However, because the area was protected and the institution had not submitted any formal requests to the appropriate government authorities, the hospital "violated Quebec's Cultural Property Act [...] and risks severe government sanctions." On June 22, 2006, it was announced that the illegal parking lot had been dismantled: the materials had been removed and grass had been sown in the affected area.

On June 6, 2013, McGill University announced its interest in purchasing the buildings and land of the Royal Victoria Hospital, which is scheduled to move to the new MUHC site in 2015. In its plan, it would maintain a mental health focus for the buildings on the Ravenscrag estate (house, stables, and gatehouse).

On March 31, 2014, the "Groupe d'experts sur l'avenir des bâtiments hospitaliers excédentaires de Montréal" (Expert Group on the Future of Surplus Hospital Buildings in Montreal) recommended, among other things, that the Quebec government "transfer all of the property, including the Allan Memorial Institute, to McGill University, according to a process and terms that remain to be negotiated." (Note: Lessard, Charlebois et Corbo 2014, p. 34)

On April 26, 2015, the Royal Victoria Hospital moved its last patients to the new MUHC site. However, some services from the former Allan Memorial Institute remains on site, including the MUHC's outpatient psychiatric services.

In 2018, the Quebec Ministry of Culture and Communications published its conservation plan for the Mount Royal heritage site. This plan cites the conservation guidelines favoured by the Ministry following a public consultation. This plan “is intended to guide the Minister’s decisions in the exercise of the powers conferred upon him under sections 64 and 65 of the Cultural Heritage Act”. Regarding Ravenscrag, the conservation plan confirms that the buildings and grounds of the estate are part of the Mount Royal heritage site. However, it does not specify which elements are to be conserved. In the list of guidelines applicable to the entire heritage site, one guideline is specific to Ravenscrag :

170. In the Golden Square Mile neighborhood, promote the maintenance of evidence of the pavilion organisation characteristic of 19th century villas, including outbuildings, as well as their landscaping, including ornamental trees on lawns, paths, walls, low walls, stairs and terraces.

In 2018 still, the Government of Quebec "commissioned the Société québécoise des infrastructures (SQI) [...] to organize the redevelopment of the entire site [of the former Royal Victoria Hospital and the Allan Memorial Institute] by means of a Master Development Plan". (Note: Beaulieu 2022, p. 1)

On August 29, 2019, the City of Montreal published its official "énoncé de l'intérêt patrimonial du site de l'institut Allan Memorial (Ancienne villa Ravenscrag)" (Statement of Heritage Interest of the Allan Memorial Institute Site (Former villa Ravenscrag)). In this statement, the City established the value it places on various elements of the Ravenscrag estate. For example, it attributed architectural and artistic value to the "exceptional quality of the architectural and design of the villa, the stables, the gatehouse and the surrounding wall, their great beauty and their representation of the opulence of the Golden Square Mile". Inside the residence, it attributed artistic value to the "formidable library furniture" as well as to the "decor incorporating gilding and the richly carved rosettes on the original ceilings of the ballroom (concealed above a suspended ceiling). However, this statement does not grant artistic value to the decorative paintings by the artist Giuseppe Guidicini in the drawing room and the library (hidden behind a layer of paint), nor to the original dining room table, probably from the J. & W. Hilton company, stored in the library, purchased by the Royal Victoria Hospital on November 19, 1940 at auction, (Note: Notorial Act, minute no. 17456, January 16, 1883, A.N.Q., p. 41) nor to the painted portraits on canvas of Lady Marguerite Ethel Allan (painted by the artist Robert Harris) and Sir Hugh Montagu Allan, both located in the entrance hall, and nor even the portrait bust of Sir Hugh Allan sculpted by Robert Forsyth, located in the portico.

On May 26, 2020, the McGill University Health Centre amended the deed of ownership of the Ravenscrag site: the legal entity of the former Royal Victoria Hospital officially transferred the Ravenscrag estate to the MUHC. (Note: Online Land Registry, p. Lot 1 341 184 (Montreal, Cadaster Quebec))

On April 13, 2021, the Heritage Council and the Jacques-Viger Committee of the City of Montreal were asked to give their opinion on a draft bylaw amending the City's urban planning bylaw, as well as on a draft bylaw concerning the site of the former Royal Victoria Hospital and the Allan Memorial Institute. These committees jointly issued 19 recommendations, including "conducting a comprehensive inventory of heritage features located within existing buildings across the entire site" and "adding provisions to the draft bylaw relating to their protection." (Note: Paré and Jacobs 2021, p. 11)

=== 2021 to current day : McGill University Pavilion ===
On May 21, 2021, the SQI submitted its Master Plan for the development of the site of the former Royal Victoria Hospital and the Allan Memorial Institute, which includes the proposed Royal Victoria University Pavilion, nicknamed the “New Vic,” of McGill University. However, in order for this plan to be validated by the City of Montreal, two draft regulations must first be adopted, thus requiring a public consultation, the work of which begins in August 2021.

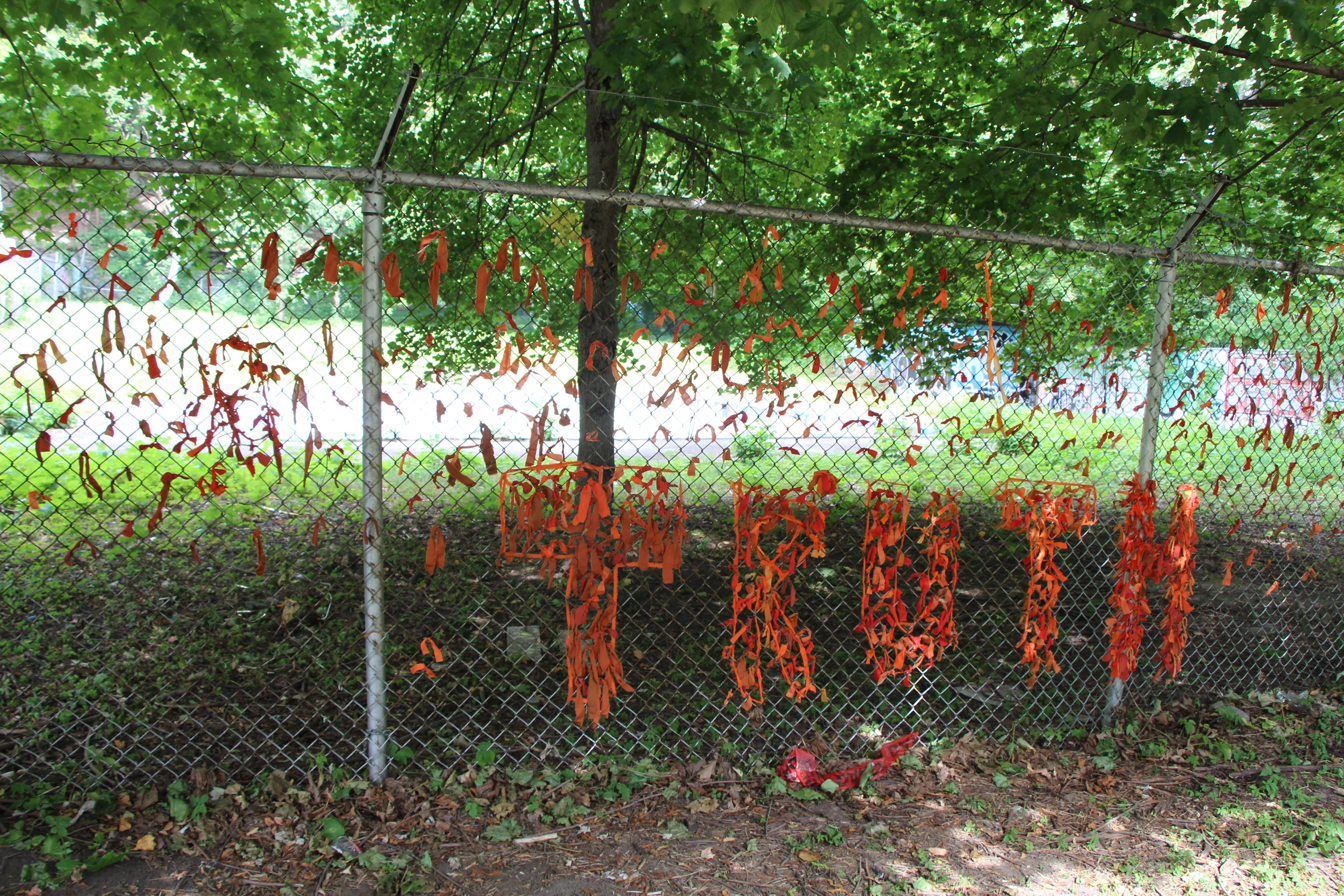
"Truth" written with orange ribbons, a colour symbolizing the suppression of culture, freedom, and self-esteem suffered by Indigenous children, on the fence of the Henry-William-Morgan pool at the Allan Memorial Institute.

On November 16, 2021, McGill University announced that it might authorize excavations at the site of the former Allan Memorial Institute to verify the presence of unmarked Indigenous burials, following allegations by a group of Mohawk women that the bodies of Indigenous children had been buried around the site as a result of psychiatric experiments conducted between 1954 and 1963. In response, on March 30, 2022, six Mohawk mothers from Kahnawake "launched a civil lawsuit in Quebec Superior Court in the hope of suspending work on the former Royal Victoria Hospital and the Allan Memorial Institute" and "providing the resources necessary for an immediate and thorough investigation of the Allan Memorial Institute site."

On May 11, 2022, the Office de consultation publique de Montréal (OCP) tabled its report on the public consultation on the draft regulations aimed at enabling the implementation of the SQI Master Plan for the development of the site of the former Royal Victoria Hospital and the Allan Memorial Institute. In this report, the OCP recommends in particular that "the City ensure that the exterior of the villa Ravenscrag is restored to its original appearance". (Note: Beaulieu 2022, p. 110) It even adds that "any future project must include a restoration [of the surrounding wall and its gates]". However, the Office does not expressly recommend the restoration or restitution of architectural or decorative elements of the interior of the former residence. Overall, the OCP "recommends moving forward with the redevelopment of the site of the former Royal Victoria Hospital by McGill University".

Work to repurpose the site will begin in the summer of 2022. Archaeological excavations are also being carried out by Arkéos company at various locations on the former site of the Royal Victoria Hospital and the Allan Memorial Institute.

On October 27, 2022, a Superior Court judge ordered the SQI and McGill University to stop all work on the site of the former Royal Victoria Hospital and the Allan Memorial Institute, and asked the parties to prepare a plan to search for anonymous graves.

On November 29, 2022, draft by-laws No. 21-032 and No. 04-047-223 enabling the implementation of the Master Plan for the development of the site of the former Royal Victoria Hospital and the Allan Memorial Institute of the SQI were adopted by Montreal City Council. (Note: Regulation no. 21-032, City of Montreal) (Note: Regulation no. 04-047-223, City of Montreal)

On April 4, 2023, the McGill University Health Centre transferred the Ravenscrag estate to the Société québécoise des infrastructures (SQI), in accordance with the 2014 recommendation of the "Groupe d'experts sur l'avenir des bâtiments hospitaliers excédentaires de Montréal" (Expert Panel on the Future of Surplus Hospital Buildings in Montreal). The MUHC, however, remains a tenant until April 2, 2028. (Note: Online land registry, p. Inscription 28 396 697 (Montreal, Cadaster of Quebec))

On April 20, 2023, the Superior Court ratified an agreement signed on April 6, 2023, by, among others, the Mohawk Mothers group, the SQI, McGill University, and the City of Montreal. According to the agreement, the archaeological excavations will be supervised by a panel of three archaeologists, assisted by a Mohawk archaeologist.

On September 14, 2023, the Mohawk Mothers again asked the Superior Court to halt work at the site of the former Royal Victoria Hospital and the Allan Memorial Institute, arguing that the terms of the agreement signed on April 6 had not been met, particularly the requirement for archaeological excavations to be supervised by a panel of archaeological experts. On November 20, 2023, the Superior Court partially ruled in favour of the Mohawk Mothers, ordering the SQI and McGill University to comply with the condition of the agreement ratified on April 20 and to have the archaeological excavations supervised by a panel of archaeological experts. A decision overturned on August 16, 2024 by the Quebec Court of Appeal, which considers that the trial judge "misunderstood the scope of his power to issue safeguard orders" and that he "appropriated the power to supervise the application of the agreement without any real debate on the merits."

== Ravenscrag : the origin of the mansion's name ==
The origin of the name "Ravenscrag," meaning "raven's hill" or literally "steep rock above a ravine," which is given to the building and the estate in general, is unclear. (Note: Rémillard 2016, p. 197) As early as 1864, the Lovell's Directory of Montreal lists Hugh Allan's address as "Ravenscraig, head of McTavish", (Note: Mackay & 1859-1870, p. 54 (Montreal Directory), Année 1863-64) proving that the choice of name was Hugh Allan's own. However, the reason for the choice is uncertain. According to an article published on November 14, 1940, in The Montreal Star, Hugh Allan named his residence "Ravenscrag" after Ravenscraig Castle, built for James II in Kirkcaldy, Scotland. Although this reason is sometimes dismissed as unlikely, "these romantic references to ancient ruined castles linked to the name of the Allan residence could be inspired by the simple, yet no less majestic, setting of the stone villa situated on a bank at the top of McTavish Street." A historical study published in 2019 also suggests that "the name possibly refers to Ravenscraig Mountain, which is located near Glasgow, Hugh Allan's childhood city."

== Architecture ==
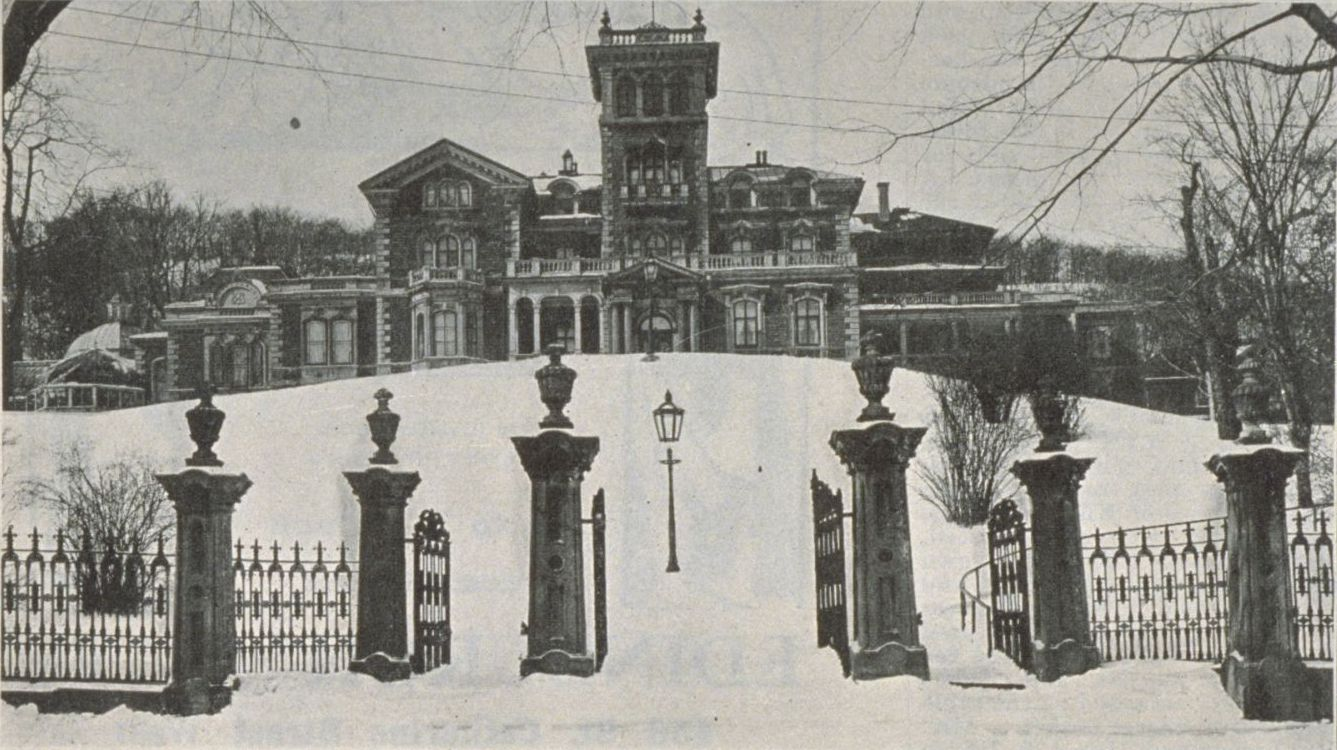
Ravenscrag in 1913

=== Exterior ===
The house is built like a villa or as an English country house in the Italianate style, following the principles of Victorian architecture.

The exterior architecture of Ravenscrag meets the requirements of the image so sought after in the Victorian era by exploiting the asymmetry of the facades and the abundance of details. The choice of the Italianate Neo-Renaissance style is not without reason: the multiple architectural and decorative elements used in the Italian Renaissance, such as the campanile, the bracketed cornice, the cherubs, and the Palladian-style windows, help achieve this image.

Ravenscrag is built of rough-faced Montreal grey-stone with smooth quoins and window surrounds. It is primarily characterized by its tower or campanile, approximately 23 meters (75 feet) high and covering an area of 1.86 m² (20 square feet), which appears to divide the house in two. All of the tower's original balconies have disappeared, and some of the French windows providing access to them have been partially walled up. An iron flagpole once stood on the tower's roof.

At the base of the tower is the vestibule, which was connected around 1899 to the old portico, creating the illusion that the tower had moved back several meters. This old portico, now sealed against the elements, features four steps on its south facade leading to a double door. This doorway is decorated with coffered rosettes in the center and surrounded by a sculpted string of Egg-and-dart, and leaves at the corners. This sculpted string is then surrounded by a string of leaves and fruits, each with a different decoration of leaves and fruits, cherubs, or lion heads.

The doorway is then extended by a window that takes the form of the arch above. This arch, which features a keystone consisting of a mascaron representing a female figure, is surrounded by a sculpted strip known as a "Bead and reel" and then by a string of Egg-and-dart. On either side of this keystone are the interlaced letters of the first and last names of the former owner, Hugh Montagu Allan, on the right, and his wife, Margerite Ethel Allan, on the left.

On either side of the doorway, a plinth supports a pair of columns. The Roman Doric capitals of the columns are crowned with a square abacus supported by a spine decorated with leaves. Their gorgets are adorned with flowers. These columns support a pediment featuring in its center what appears to be a dog's head, above which is the Allan family motto in Latin, "Spero," meaning "hope." For some, this motto demonstrates the Allan family's concern for human misery and their willingness to improve the living conditions of the poor. For others, this motto signifies more for Hugh Allan the value of "determination".

The south facade of the ballroom still bears Sir Hugh Allan's coat of arms. Furthermore, the ballroom's mansard roof was once covered with a cast iron crest, which was removed in the 1940s. The former access to the greenhouse from the ballroom was also walled up, with the exception of an opening to allow access to the Irving Ludmer Psychiatry Research and Training Pavilion.

The roof, called "gable slope" or "butterfly," is covered with batten-shaped metal sheets.

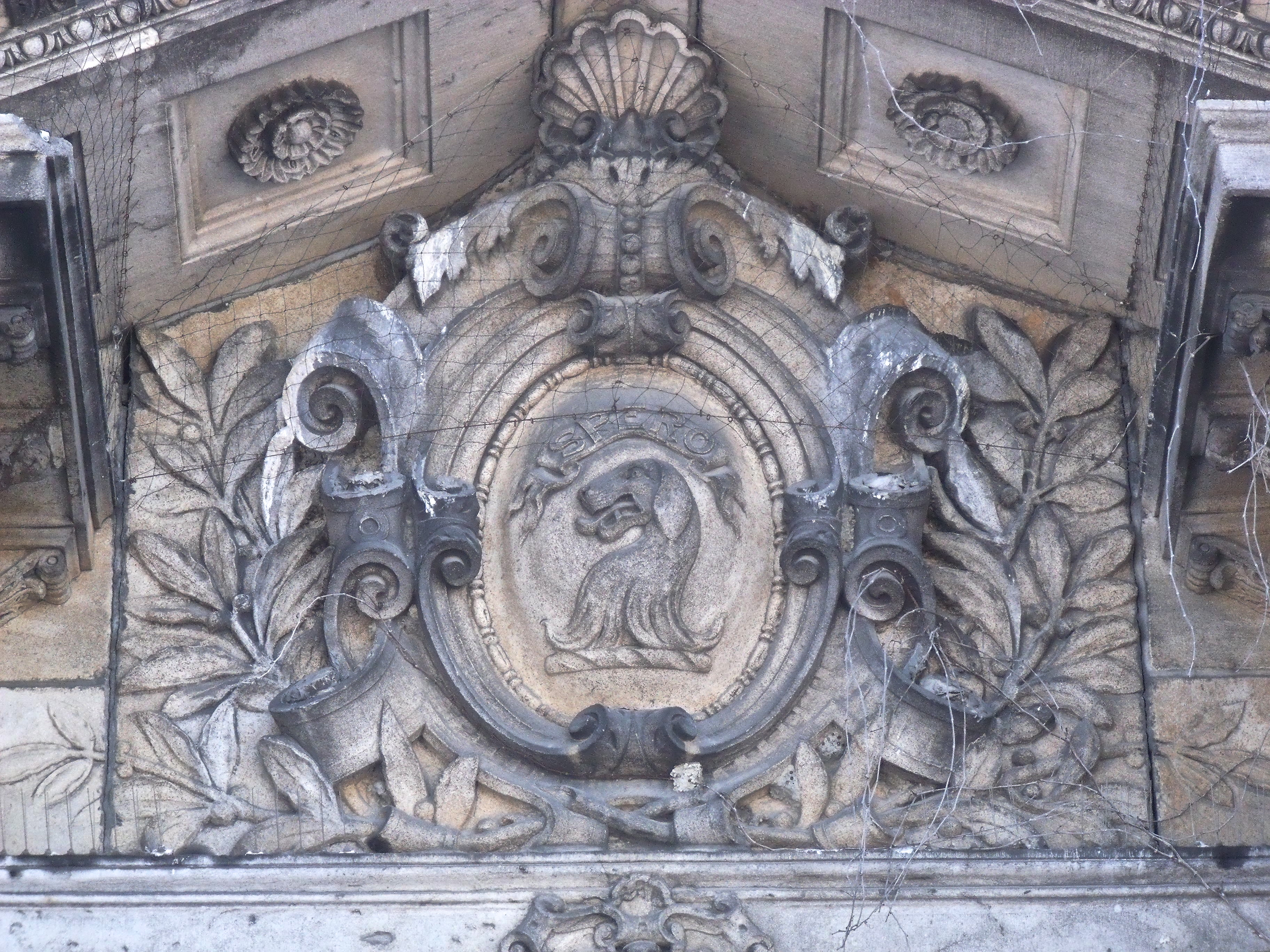
Dog's head crowned with the motto "Spero" of the Allan family

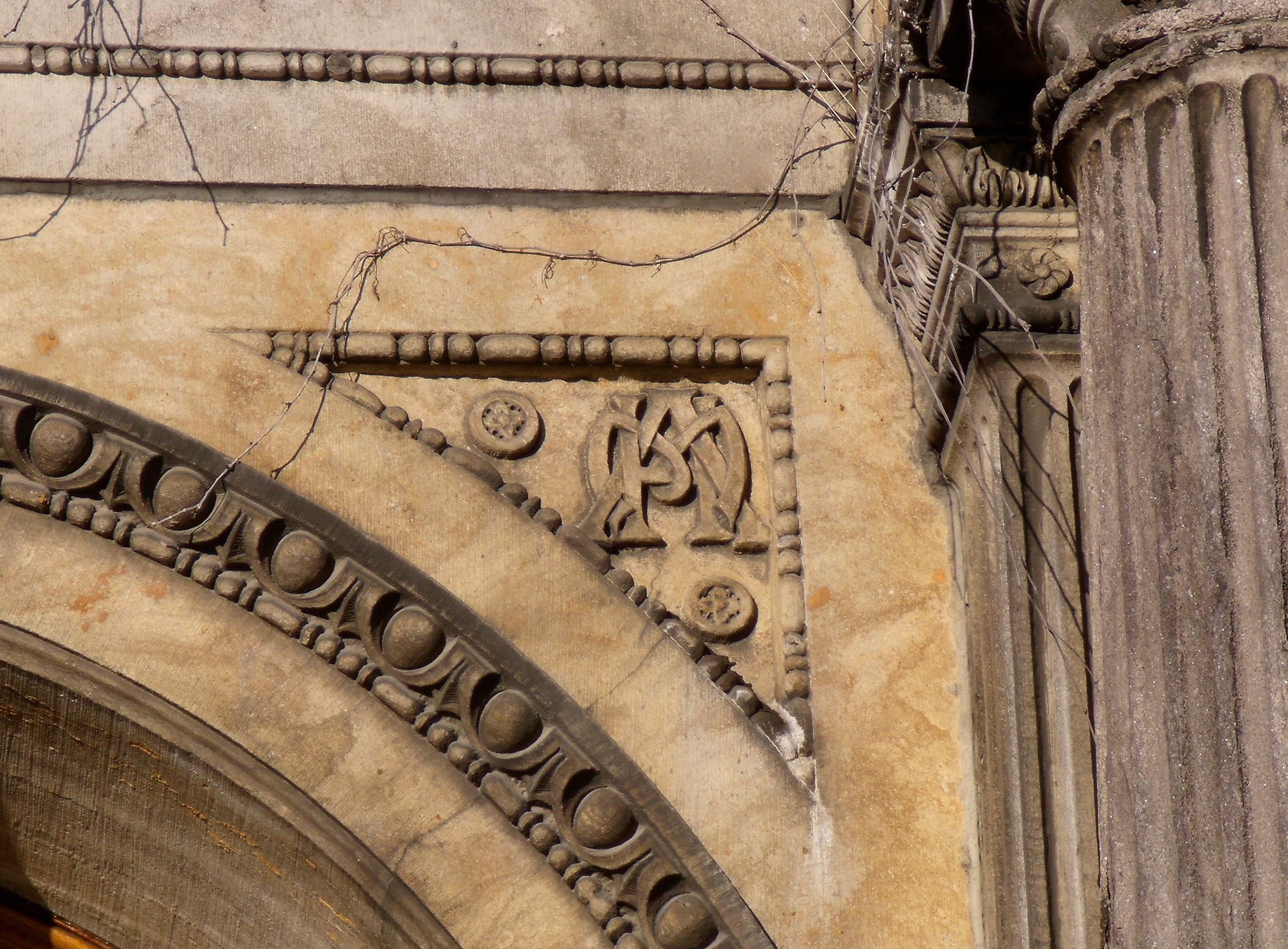
Intertwined letters "H", "M" and "A" for Hugh Montagu Allan

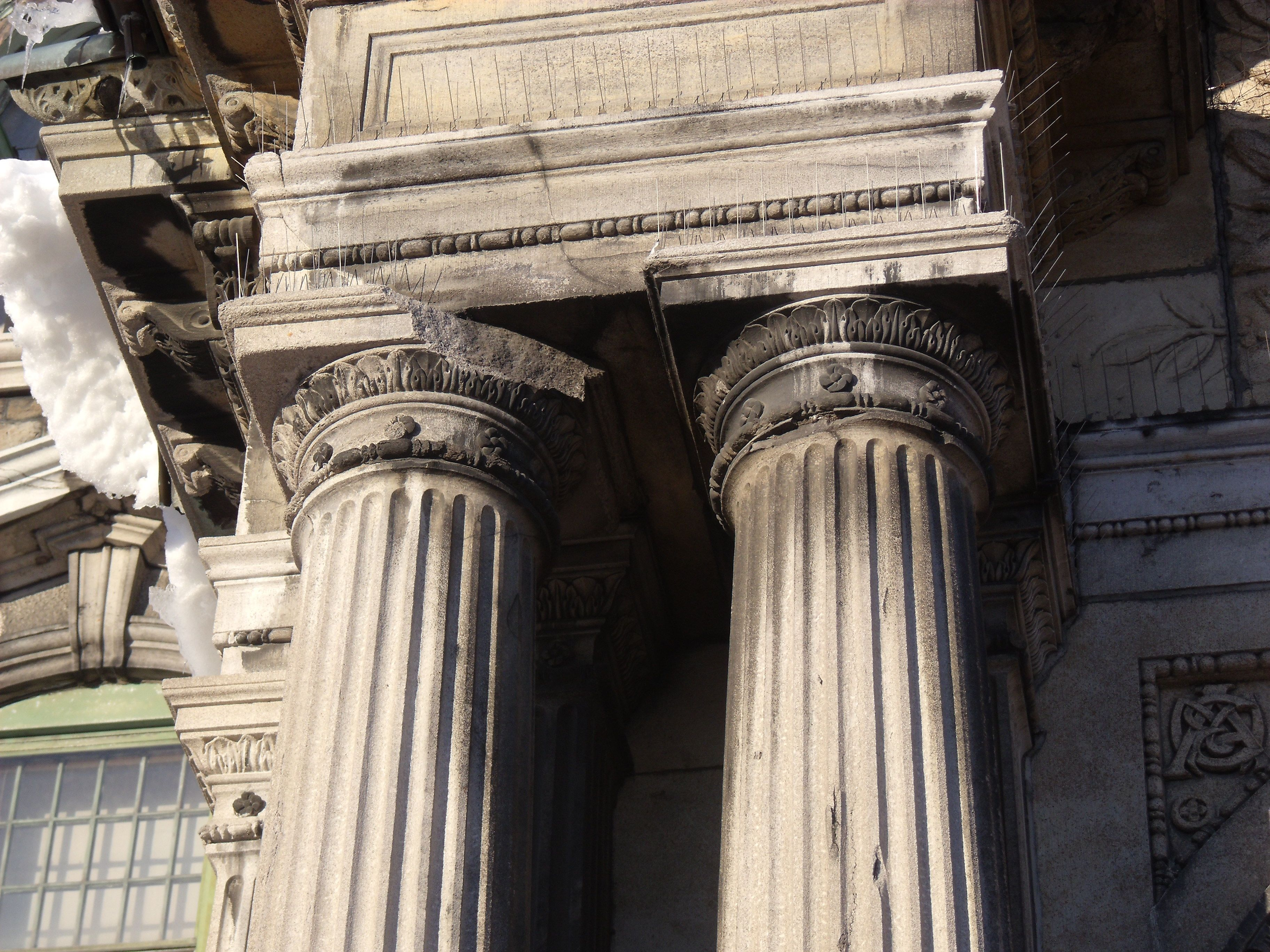
Detail of the columns (2012)

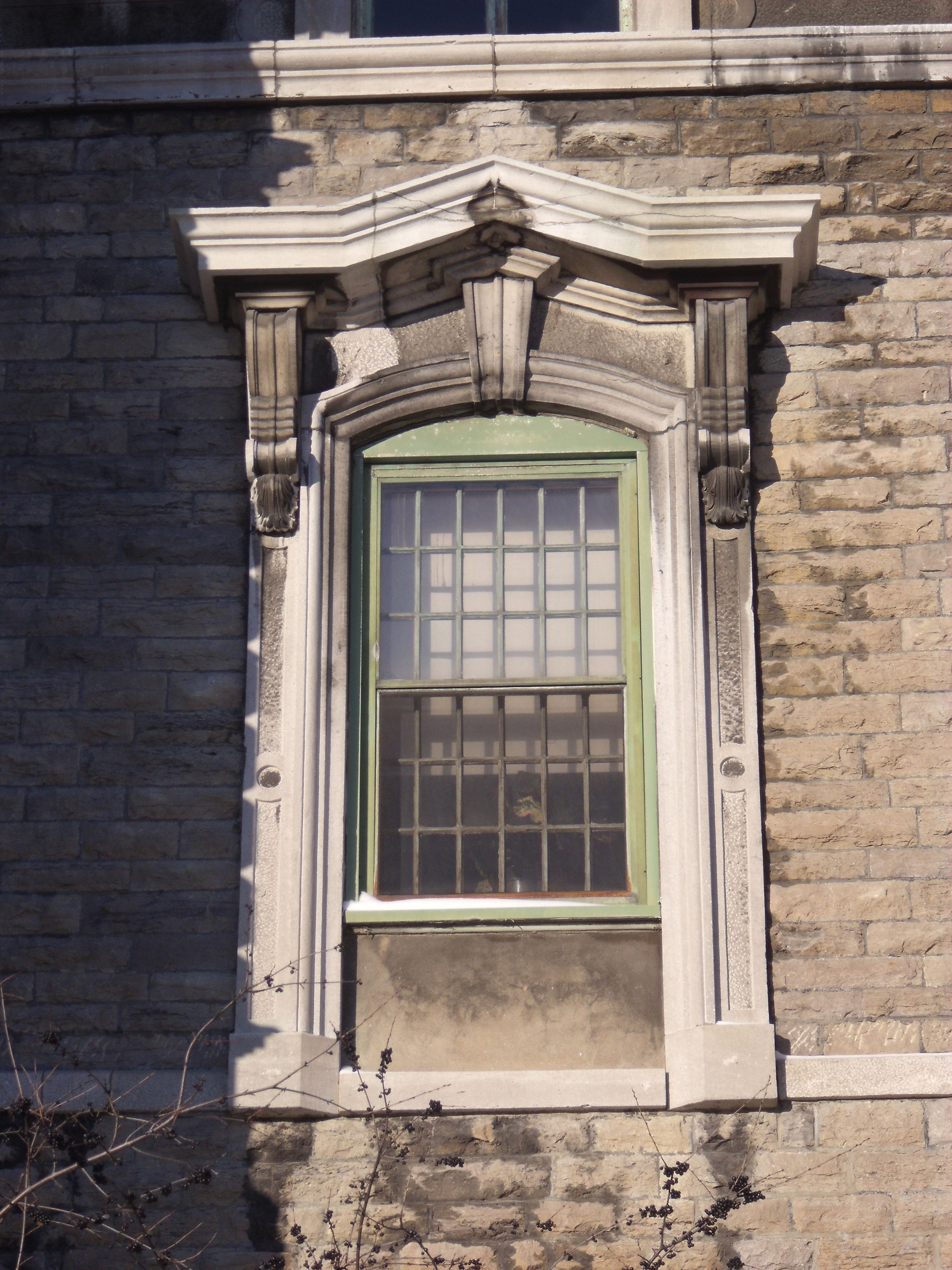
Palladian style window (2012)

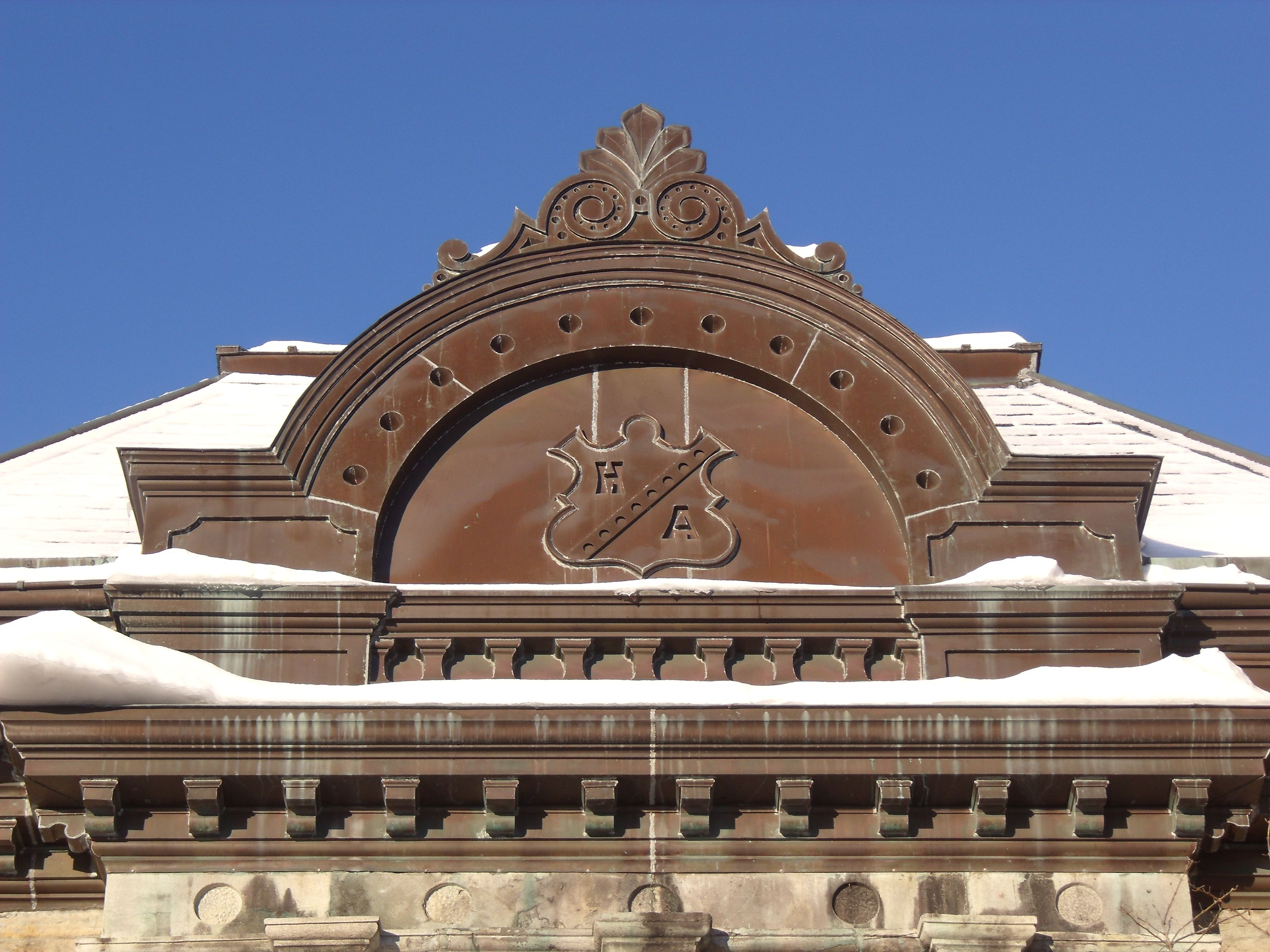
Coat of arms of Sir Hugh Allan (2012)

=== Interior ===
The interior of the residence had 34 rooms after 1865, excluding the servants' quarters and outbuildings. The residence and the servants' quarters together had a floor area of approximately 4,968 m^{2} (53,475 sqft) over five floors, including the basement and attic. The reception rooms were built of a size and style compatible for society gatherings and to receive royalty, the first known instance of which occurred in 1869 when the Allans entertained the young Prince Arthur during his year in Montreal with the Rifle Brigade.

The interior of the house was a typically eclectic example of Victorian style. Bright colours were used, such as the green silk-woven lining on the dining room walls. There were also hand-painted frescos and murals illustrated with mythological or quotidian scenes, and decorative elements were embellished with gilding.

The painted decorations
In 1863, the Italian-born painter Giuseppe Guidicini did the decorative paintings of at least two rooms at Ravenscrag, namely the drawing room and the library. These paintings depicted mythological scenes or quotidian scenes. However, no information or study exists on the iconographic description of the artist's paintings Furthermore, when the residence was converted into a psychiatric institution in 1943, all of these paintings were covered with white paint, rendering them unreadable. Also, there is no information explaining how Hugh Allan chose this artist to decorate his residence. It is possible that Hugh Allan admired the decorations created by the artist at the Victoria Mansion in Portland during one of his business trips. Indeed, Hugh Allan, whose shipping company served that city, stopped there at least once between 1860 and 1862. It is also possible that Hugh Allan met the artist in Montreal, where the latter was creating the temporary decorations for the Cosmopolitan Hotel on Place d'Armes for the wedding of Albert Edward, Prince of Wales (later King Edward VII), and Princess Alexandra of Denmark (later Queen Alexandra) on March 10, 1863.

In 1872, in anticipation of the visit to Montreal of the Earl of Dufferin, the third Governor General of Canada, Hugh Allan decided to enhance the decoration of the ballroom. He possibly commissioned John McArthur's firm to execute the painted decorations for this room. (Note: See the section "1863 to 1882: Sir Hugh Allan" of this article for more information.)

The woodwork

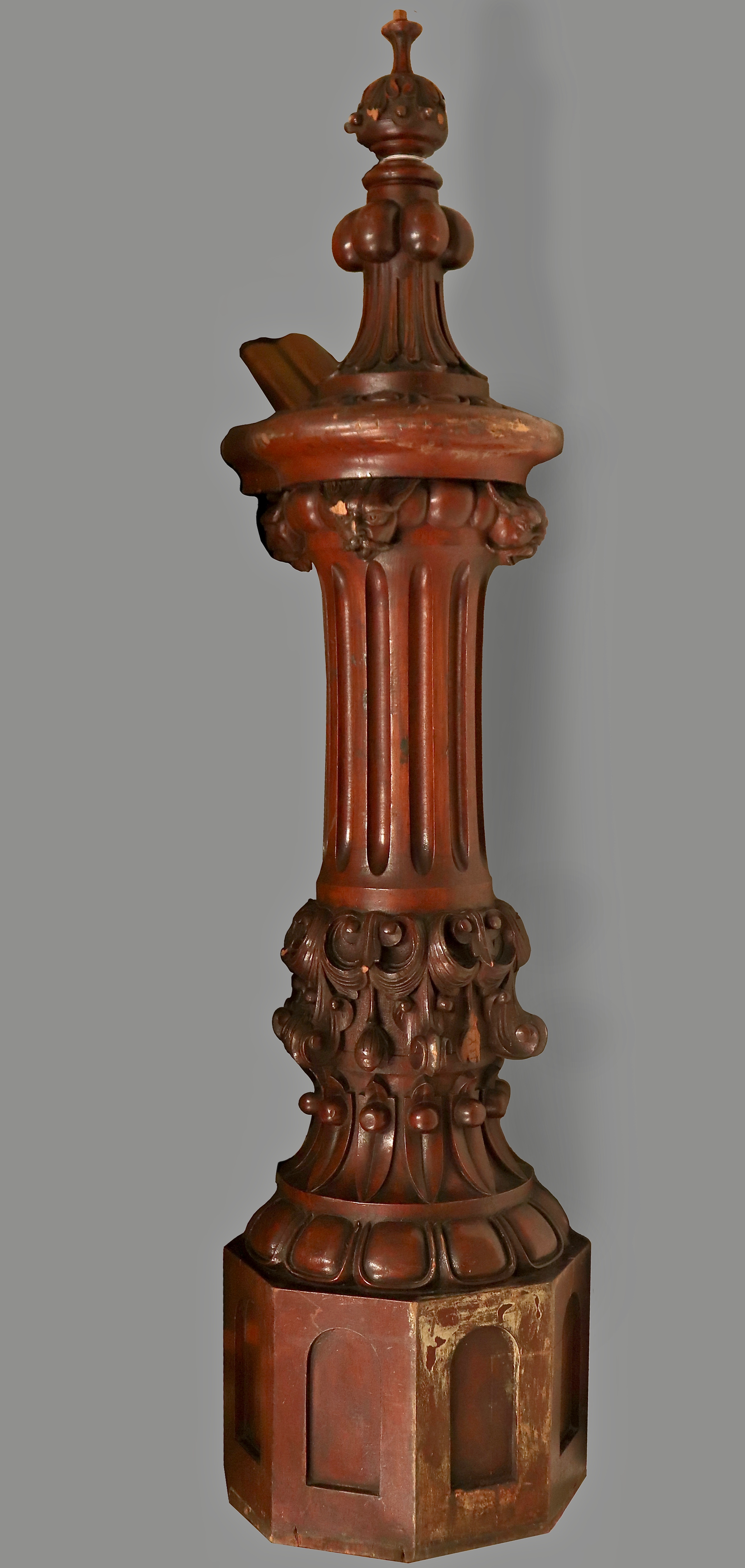
Ground Floor Staircase Newel, by George Roberts' company circa 1862, kept at MUMAQ - Musée des métiers d'art du Québec

Between 1861 and 1862 (main residence), and then around 1865 (annex rooms), George Roberts' company completed all the woodwork for the building, from the wood structure to the ornamental wood carving incorporated into the structure.

In 1899, the Montreal-based firm of decorator Walter P. Scott did the woodwork for the vestibule, entrance hall, small living room, and dining room during the alterations made to the residence.

The furtniture
To furnish his new residence, Hugh Allan appears to have primarily used the services of the J. & W. Hilton firm of Montreal. Indeed, a publication by the Canada Railway Advertising Company in 1864 specifies that this firm was "employed to furnish the library of Mr. Hugh Allan's splendid residence at the mountain." Furthermore, the publication adds that "those who are qualified to judge, have declared that this particular apartment to be, as far as cabinet-work is concerned, the most magnificently fitted up of any in Canada." It is therefore likely that this firm furnished and decorated most of the rooms in this residence at that time.

The Montreal cabinetmaker James Thomson may also have produced some furniture for Ravenscrag. In fact, on March 13, 1869, this cabinetmaker signed an agreement with Hugh Allan providing the necessary capital to establish a furniture manufacturing company. (Note: Notorial Act, minute no. 14741, March 13, 1869, A.N.Q.)

The Montreal firm of decorator Walter P. Scott also likely produced some furniture for Ravenscrag during the 1899 alterations to the residence, possibly including the Renaissance Revival-style dining room sideboard.

The firm of decorator W. Henry Bell of Bell's Galleries in Montreal supplied furniture for Ravenscrag between 1911 and 1913, possibly including Louis XVI style armchairs for the main drawing room.

In fact, there are two inventories of the original furnishings that once furnished the house: the Ravenscrag furniture list compiled during the inventory of Hugh Allan's estate in January 1883, (Note: Notorial Act, minute no. 17456, January 16, 1883, A.N.Q., p. 1) and the list of furniture offered for sale by Hugh Montagu Allan at the auction held on November 18 and 19, 1940, by Fraser Bros Ltd. However, the first directory does not mention the manufacturer(s) of the furniture cited, and the second is not yet accessible since no public library possesses a copy and the auction company lost all the records of the auction held in 1940 during a fire that ravaged the company's building on January 7, 1942.

The decorations and the conversion into a hospital building (1943)
In 1943, the newly established Allan Memorial Institute converted the residence into a hospital building, according to plans by the architectural firm Lawson and Little. (Note: These plans, executed by the architectural firm "Lawson and Little", subsequently passed on to the architectural firm "Betts, Beaudoin, Cash and Nobbsm", were destroyed by the latter in 1970.) At that time, the painted decorations in the drawing room and the library were covered with white paint, while those on the ballroom ceiling were concealed behind a false ceiling. (Note: Gersovitz 2019, p. 109) As for the remaining decorations, the institute invited Jean-Marie Gauvreau of the École du meuble de Montréal to come and salvage all the architectural elements from the interior of Ravenscrag, free of charge. All easily removable elements, such as doors, columns, frames, and carved wooden overdoors, or even the wrought-iron railing of the musicians' gallery, were then salvaged and added to the collection, forming a group of hundreds, if not thousands, of objects. In 1958, the École du Meuble became the Institut des Arts Appliqués. Then, in 1967, with the founding of the CEGEPs, the Institut des Arts Appliqués came under the authority of the Cégep du Vieux Montréal, and the Jean-Marie Gauvreau collection became the property of the Ministry of Education. From 1984 to 1994, the collection was the property of the Ministry of Higher Education and Science. Then, from 1994 to 2005, the collection once again became the property of the Ministry of Education and Science. In 2005, he agreed to donate the collection to the Musée des maîtres et artisans du Québec, renamed the MUMAQ - Musée des métiers d'art du Québec in 2020. However, the objects in the Jean-Marie Gauvreau collection, particularly those from Ravenscrag, did not all have the same history. After 1967, the collection was stored in several different locations. Some were kept at the Hélène-de-Champlain Pavilion, others at the Jacques-Cartier Bridge Pavilion, and still others in a warehouse on Notre-Dame Street East in Montreal. During the 1980s, a "housecleaning" of the collection was undertaken; that is, under the direction of Luc d'Iberville-Moreau and Gérard Lavallée, among others, a complete review of the collection took place, and several institutions shared the objects among themselves at that time. For example, in 1985, part of the collection was stored at the Musée des arts décoratifs de Montréal. Then, in 1987, part was stored at the Musée d'Art de Saint-Laurent. Other institutions also inherited objects from the collection, such as the Montreal Museum of Fine Arts, the MacDonald-Stewart Foundation, the McCord Stewart Museum, the Musée national des beaux-arts du Québec, and the Musée de la civilisation. Some objects, lacking provenance information and deemed to be in poor condition or of no interest, were literally thrown away or given away. Regarding the objects in the collection from Ravenscrag, Jean-Marie Gauvreau reportedly failed to properly identify them or did not identify them at all upon acquisition, making tracing their history complex. Nevertheless, the MUMAQ - Musée des métiers d'art du Québec has held some of these objects, which have been stored in a warehouse beneath the Boisé Library in the Saint-Laurent borough since 2013. Another part of these objects is kept by the MacDonald-Stewart Foundation. The Montreal Museum of Fine Arts stores the Renaissance Revival-style dining room sideboard, (Note: Loan from the Ministry of Education and Science, Inventory number : 170.1993.) and the McCord Stewart Museum has the small living room's sofa, (Note: Sofa, circa 1875, Inventory number : M999.59.1.) and two of the ballroom's chairs. (Note: Chairs, late 19th century, Inventory numbers : M999.28.1 and M999.28.2.)

==== Basement ====
The basement of the residence originally had two possible accesses: one from the passageway leading from the servants' quarters to the east, the other connecting to the outside from the workshop to the west. According to plans executed by architects Andrew Thomas Taylor and George William Gordon around 1889, the basement included : a wine cellar, five various store rooms, four coal rooms, a workshop, three servants' bedrooms, and a corridor connecting the rooms and leading to the servants' quarters. (Note: Taylor & Gordon 1889, p. Basement & Ground Floor)

==== Ground floor ====
The main floor, or ground floor of the residence, originally had four possible accesses : one from the main entrance, one from the conservatory, one from the rear, and one from the passage leading to the servants' quarters. After 1899, the ground floor comprised a vestibule, an entrance hall, a cloakroom, a corridor, a small living room or lounge (part of the entrance hall), a pantry, a breakfast room, a dining room, a small reception room, a large drawing room in the Italian Renaissance style, a library, a billiard room, an anteroom adjoining the ballroom, a ballroom in the French Second Empire style, and a thirty-meter-long conservatory.

Vestibule
Built around 1899 to the designs of the architectural firm Taylor and Gordon, the vestibule is loosely inspired by the Italian Renaissance. It is primarily characterized by an archway supported by two Doric columns, between which passes a staircase leading to the main entrance hall. The vaulted ceiling is coffered, featuring carved wood Red Roses of Lancaster and possibly a stylized version of the Scottish primrose. Two niches flank the staircase. The floor is covered with marble tiles. Originally, the walls were also hung with tapestries, and the windows contained stained glass.

Entrance Hall
The entrance hall is also loosely inspired by the Italian Renaissance. It was originally built in 1862 according to plans by Victor Roy of the architectural firm of William Spier & Sons. The sculpted decoration was entrusted to the firm of carpenter and cabinetmaker George Roberts. Around 1899, the old vestibule was merged with the entrance hall, as was the former School Room, which was converted into a small living room. At this time, four fluted columns with Corinthian capitals, identical to the two pre-existing columns from 1862, were added by the decorating firm of Walter P. Scott of Montreal. Like the vestibule, the floor is also covered with marble tiles. This room contained in 1883, among other things, a bronze pendant light and its two matching wall sconces, six oak chairs, two oak tables with marble tops, two bronze sculpted groups on pedestals, seven paintings on canvas and a black marble floor clock with decorative gilt bronze sconces. (Note: Notorial Act, minute no. 17456, January 16, 1883, A.N.Q., p. 42) (Note: Notorial Act, minute no. 17456, January 16, 1883, A.N.Q., p. 43) (Note: Notorial Act, minute no. 17456, January 16, 1883, A.N.Q., p. 44)

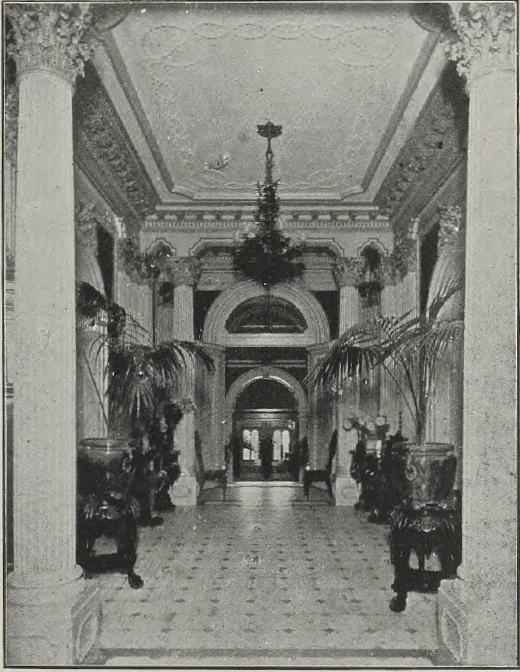
Entrance hall (1906)

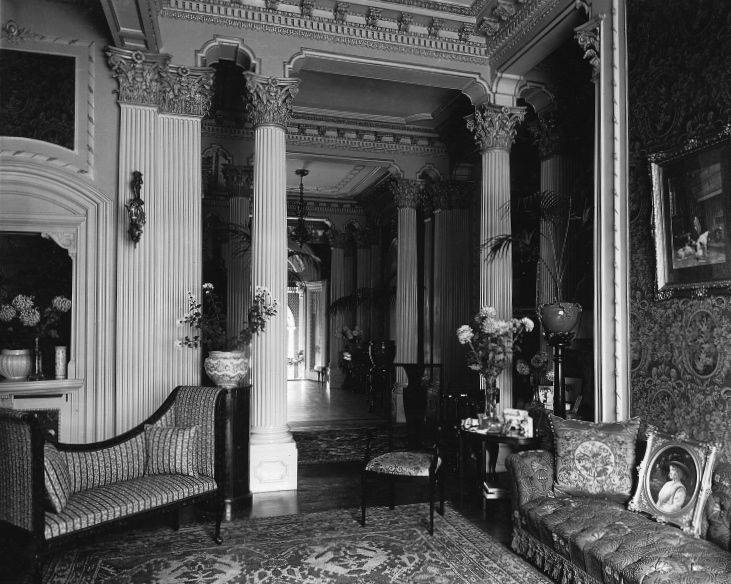
View of the entrance hall from the small living room (1902)

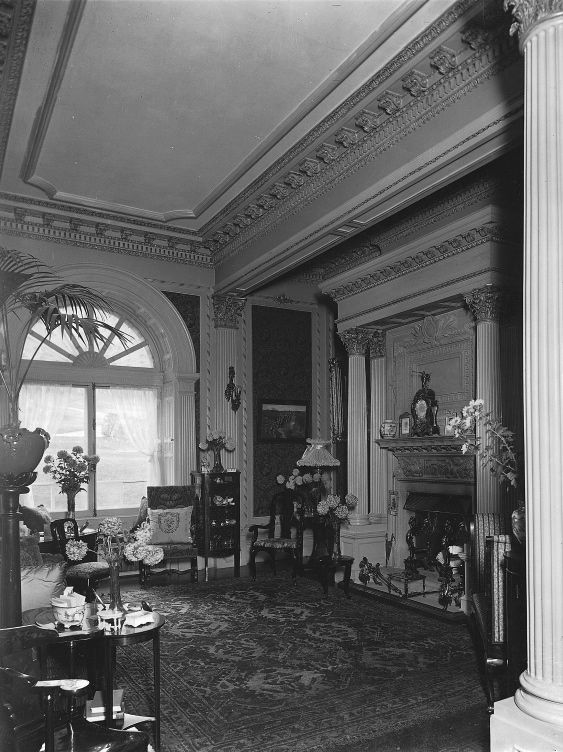
Small living room (1902)

Small living room or lounge
Located at the far end of the entrance hall, between the pantry and the breakfast room, the small sitting room was originally a school room for the home education of Hugh Allan's children. (Note: Notorial Act, minute no. 17456, January 16, 1883, A.N.Q., p. 27) After his death in 1882, this room appears to have been converted into a bedroom. Then, around 1899, it was incorporated into the entrance hall and became a small living room. This room is particularly notable for its Caen stone fireplace mantel, on which is carved the Allan family motto, "Spero". The walls are hung with Flemish tapestries.

Dining Room

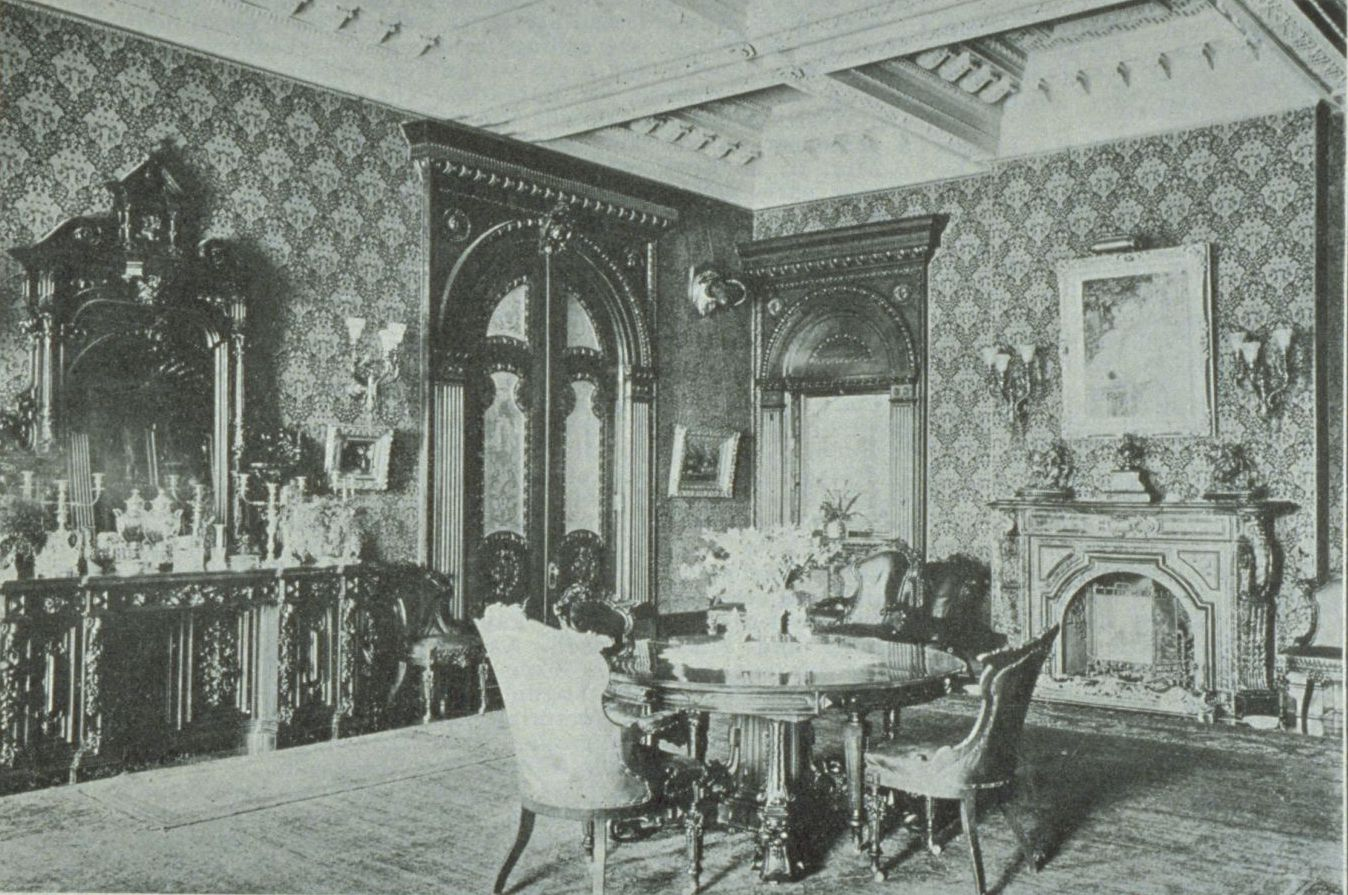
Dining room (1913)

Located to the right or northeast of the entrance hall, the dining room was originally built in 1862 to designs by Victor Roy of the architectural firm of William Spier & Sons. The carved decoration was then entrusted to the firm of carpenter and cabinetmaker George Roberts. Around 1899, this room was extended by about 3 meters (approximately ten feet) according to designs by the architectural firm of Taylor and Gordon, and its interior was "redecorated" by the firm of Walter P. Scott. Little information exists regarding the redecoration of this room at that time. According to an article in The Saturday Mirror on March 8, 1913, this was the room that "was among the apartments relatively redecorated", but the article did not specify what alterations were made to it. In all cases, after 1899, the ceiling was coffered, the walls were hung with green and gold silk tapestries, and the mantelpiece was made of green marble decorated with gilt-bronze sconces.. The table and its sixteen carved oak chairs upholstered in leather, purchased during Hugh Allan's time, probably came from the J. & W. Hilton company of Montreal. Other furniture was custom-made when the room was redecorated around 1899, such as the Neo-Renaissance style sideboard crowned with the Allan family motto "Spero". (Note: Porter 1993, p. 149) (Note: Porter 1993, p. 289) (Note: Porter 1993, p. 291)

Breakfast Room
Located in the northeast corner of the residence, and adjacent to the kitchens, the breakfast room was originally built in 1862 according to plans by Victor Roy of the architectural firm William Spier & Sons. No information exists to describe the room's decoration. Architectural plans drawn up around 1889 only indicate that it contained a fireplace. Otherwise, no photographs or newspaper articles document the room's decor. As it was a rather secondary room reserved for the family, it is possible that it was decorated more simply than the other rooms on the ground floor, similar to the breakfast room in the George Stephen House on Drummond Street in Montreal. Nevertheless, the inventory of Hugh Allan's estate, drawn up in January 1883, which lists the furniture in this room, provides some insight into how it was furnished at the time. Thus, it contained, among other things, a bronze pendant light and its 4 matching wall sconces, a black walnut table and its eight chairs, two mahogany sideboards, two armchairs, a sofa and a black marble clock.

Reception Room
Located southwest of the entrance hall and preceding the drawing room, the reception room was primarily used by the hosts to receive guests at large events, but also for entertaining a small group of guests at more intimate gatherings. It was built in 1862 to designs by Victor Roy of the architectural firm of William Spier & Sons, and the carved decoration was executed by the firm of carpenter and cabinetmaker George Roberts. No photographs exist to document the room's decoration, and there is no information indicating whether the painter Giuseppe Guidicini ever worked there. However, an article published on March 8, 1913, in The Saturday Mirror described the room as "a charming reception room decorated in the general style of the period in delicate shades of lavender and containing a fine Carrara marble fireplace." In addition, it notably contained in 1883 a crystal pendant light and its two matching wall sconces, an engraving of the portrait of Hugh Allan in a gilt frame, two paintings on canvas, two black walnut desks, two bronze sculpted groups, a black marble clock, seven chairs, several small tables and a pair of damask curtains with its carved and gilt wooden gallery. (Note: Notorial Act, minute no. 17456, January 16, 1883, A.N.Q., p. 38) (Note: Notorial Act, minute no. 17456, January 16, 1883, A.N.Q., p. 39) (Note: Notorial Act, minute no. 17456, January 16, 1883, A.N.Q., p. 40)

Drawing Room
Adjacent to the reception room, the drawing room was built in 1862 according to plans by Victor Roy of the architectural firm of William Spier & Sons in the Italian Renaissance Revival style. The carved decoration was executed by the firm of carpenter and cabinetmaker George Roberts. In 1863, the painter Giuseppe Guidicini did all the decorative paintings of this room. The crystal pendant lights and their eight matching wall sconces came from F. & C. Osler of Birmingham, UK. The Carrara marble mantelpiece was probably made in 1862 by the Montreal sculptors Jules Souquère and Gervais Buffle (Souquère, Buffle & Co.). Many of the furnishings in this room (chairs, armchairs, sofas, sideboards, mirrors, curtains, and their carved and gilded wooden galleries) date from the time of Hugh Allan and came from the firm of J. & W. Hilton of Montreal. (Note: Notorial Act, minute no. 17456, January 16, 1883, A.N.Q., p. 32-37) In addition, between 1911 and 1913, Montagu possibly commissioned Louis XVI style armchairs for this room from decorator W. Henry Bell of Bell's Galleries in Montreal.

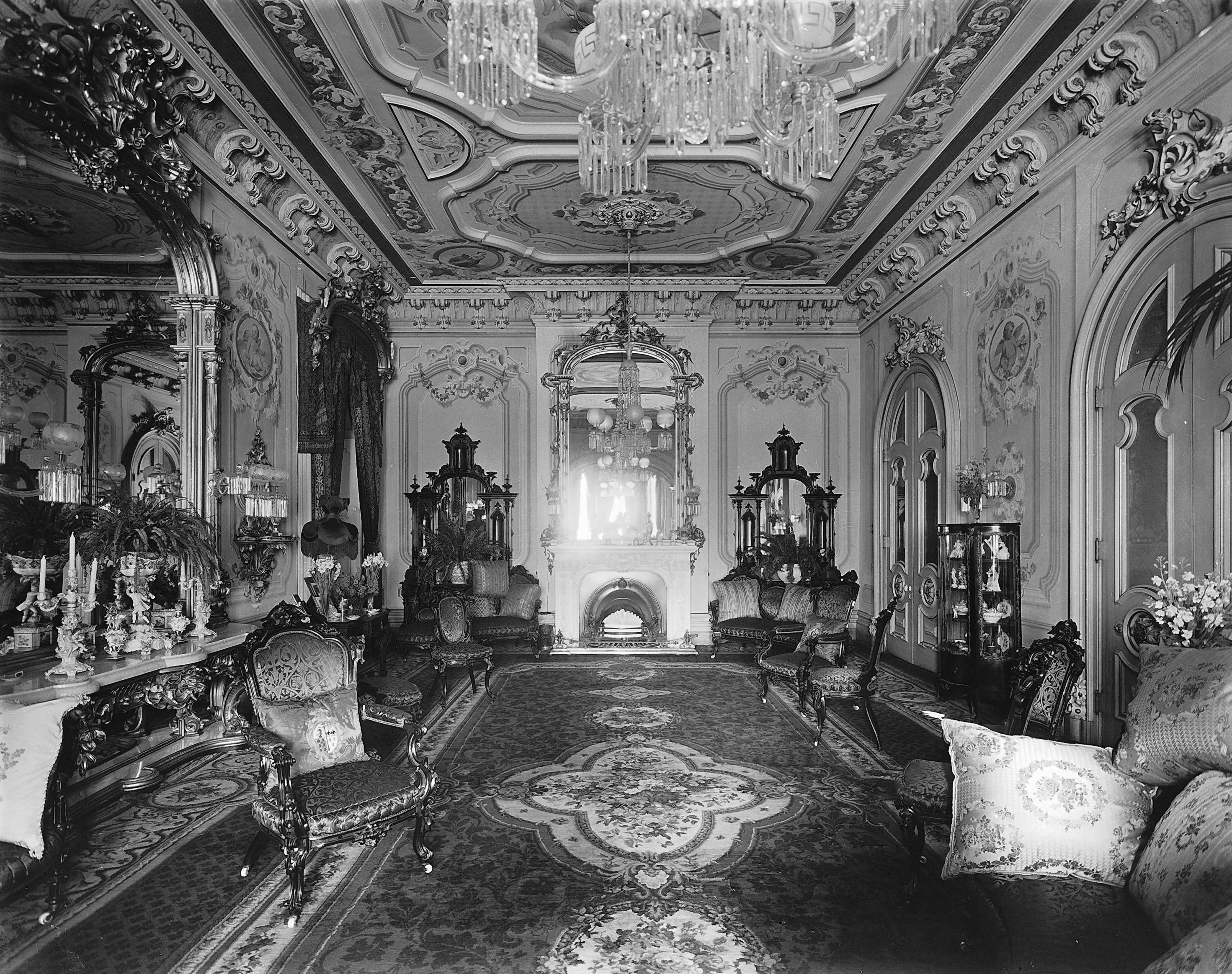
Drawing room (1911)

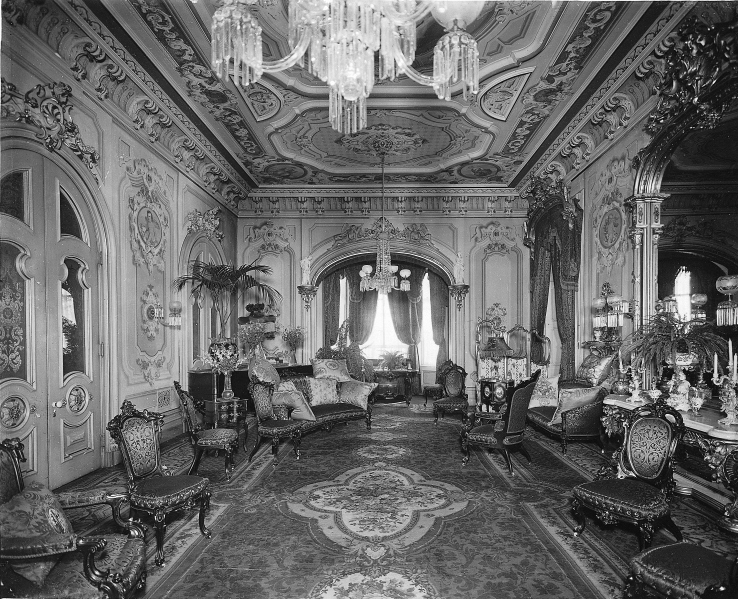
Drawing room (1911)

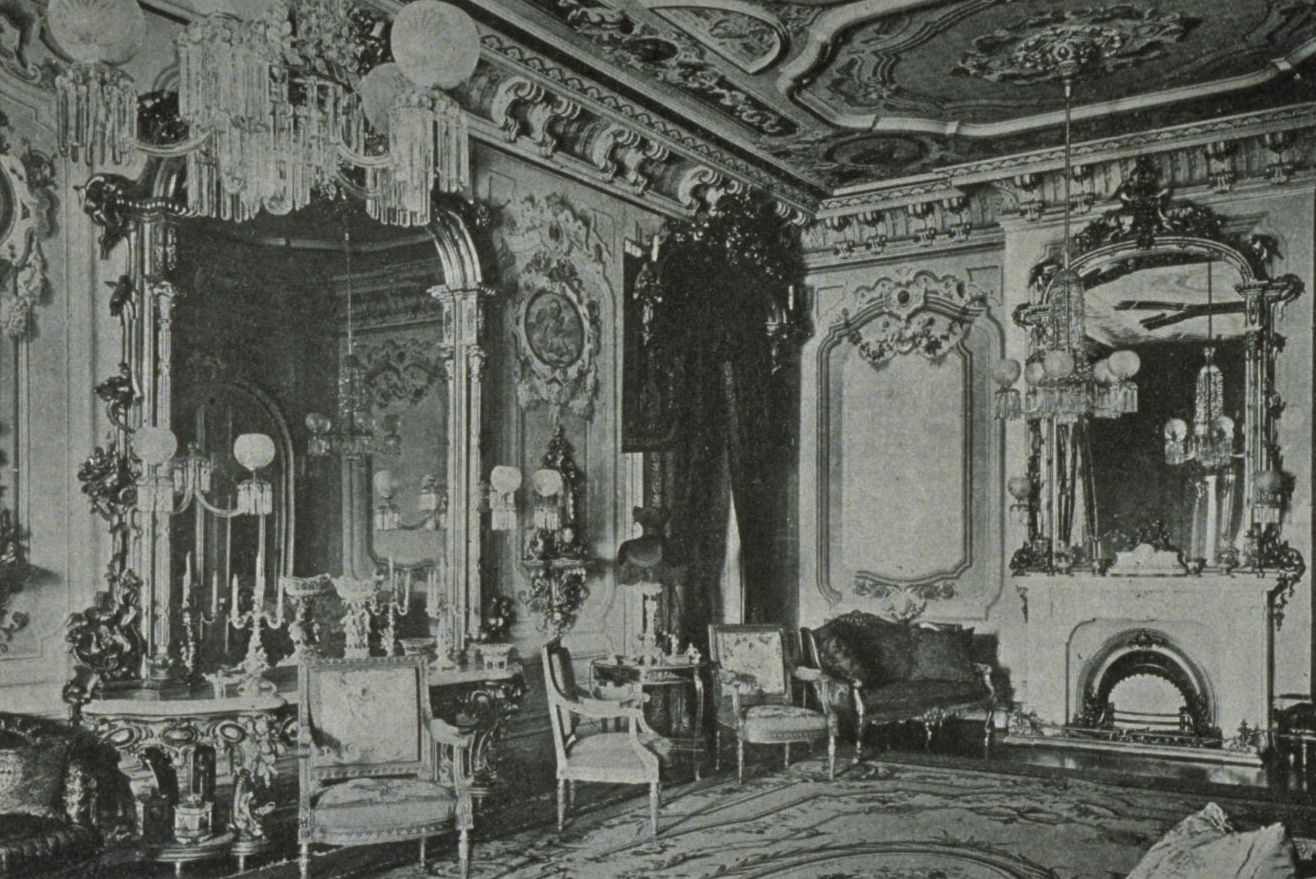
Drawing room (1913)

Billiard Room
Located southwest of the entrance hall, the billiard room was built around 1865 to designs by Victor Roy of the architectural firm Fowler & Roy, and the carved decoration was executed by the firm of carpenter and cabinetmaker George Roberts. No photographs exist to document the room's decoration. However, an article published on March 8, 1913, in The Saturday Mirror describes the room as being "decorated in pale green and white tones with parquet flooring and heavy silk hangings in pleasing shades of red and green." Furthermore, the inventory of Hugh Allan's estate, drawn up in January 1883, which lists the furniture in this room, provides some insight into how it was furnished at the time. Thus, it contained, among other things, a billiard table and its accessories, six paintings on canvas, a hanging light fixture, four bronze wall sconces, two chairs and a sofa covered in red velvet, a Brussels rug and a pair of curtains and its gallery in carved and gilded wood.

Antechamber to the Ballroom
Located southwest of the main drawing room and northwest of the billiard room, the antechamber to the ballroom was built around 1865 according to plans by Victor Roy of the architectural firm Fowler & Roy. The carved decoration was executed by the firm of carpenter and cabinetmaker George Roberts. This room was designed to showcase the ballroom; that is, as a guest passed through it from the main drawing room, they gradually discovered the larger and more ornate ballroom. It was also used as an extension of the ballroom when the latter was too small for large events. It contained little "permanent" furniture, meaning that it was furnished according to the type of reception being held. It did, however, contain a pair of curtains and a gallery of carved and gilded wood.

Ballroom
Located southwest of the anteroom and northeast of the conservatory, the ballroom is the largest room in the residence, both in floor area and volume. It was built around 1865 according to plans by Victor Roy of the architectural firm Fowler & Roy, loosely inspired by the French Second Empire style. The carved decoration was executed by the firm of carpenter and cabinetmaker George Roberts. The painted decoration, however, dates from 1872 and is likely the work of the team of painter John McArthur.

The room is primarily characterized by its fluted and dentiled columns and pilasters with composite capitals. These are painted white and enhanced with colors and gilding, and support a modillion cornice. The vaulted ceiling is coffered with irregular shapes and painted with geometric forms in various shades of green, yellow, red, blue, or mauve, and sometimes highlighted with gilding. Some ceiling coffers contain medallions in their center depicting a profile portrait against a gold background, while others contain rectangular paintings illustrating allegories on a gold background, including the allegory of music and dance. In the southwest corner of the room, above the entrance to the greenhouse, a minstrels' gallery, which could accommodate an orchestra, was particularly distinguished by its wrought-iron railing. The room also contained four niches, each holding a statue. The three crystal pendant lights, as well as all the wall sconces, came from F. & C. Osler of Birmingham, UK. As for the furniture, the chairs, armchairs, sofas, mirrors, curtains, and their carved and gilded wooden galleries date from Hugh Allan's time and probably came from the J. & W. Hilton company of Montreal. (Note: Notorial Act, minute no. 17456, January 16, 1883, A.N.Q., p. 23)

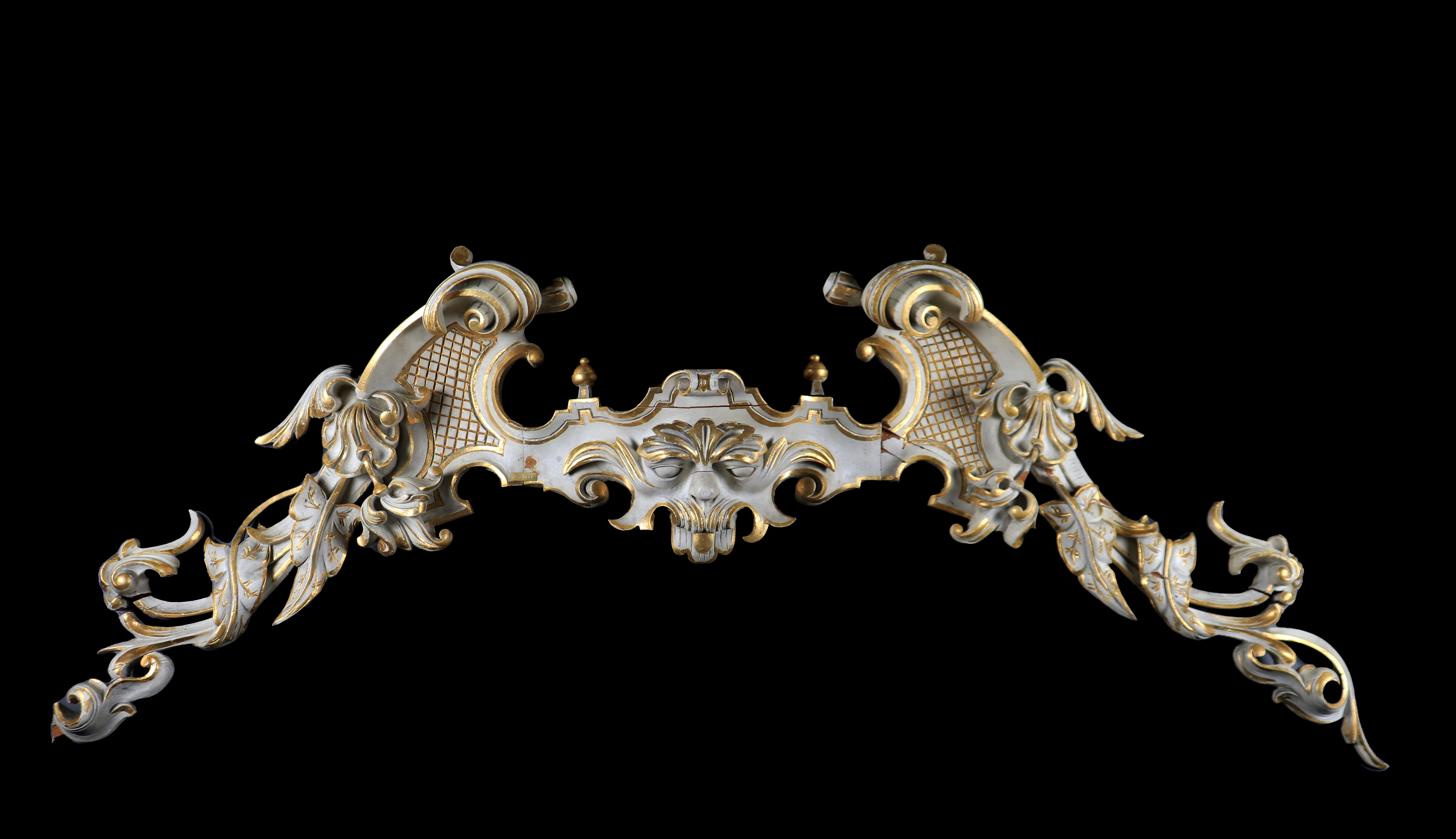
Overdoors of the ballroom by George Roberts (circa 1865), preserved at the MUMAQ

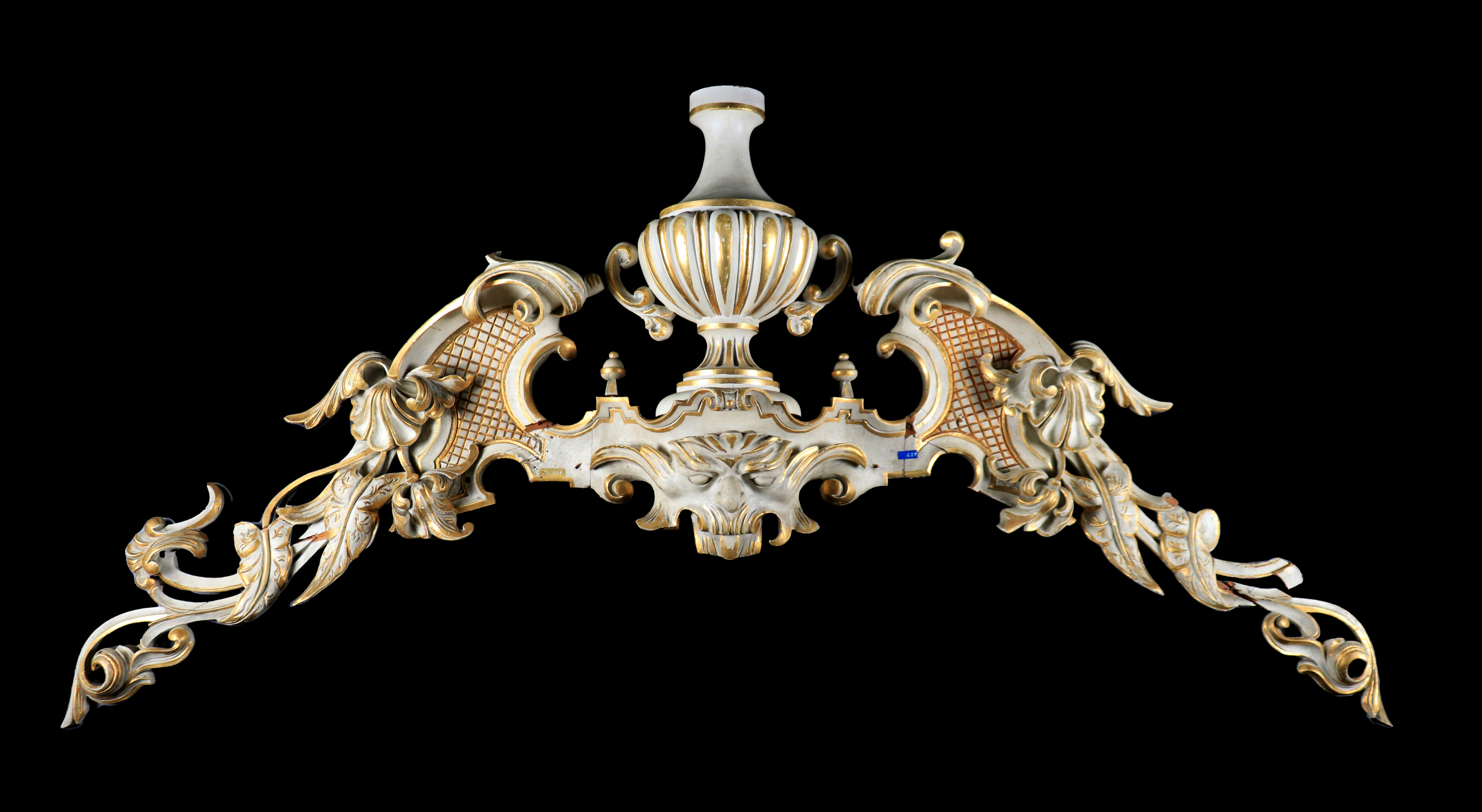

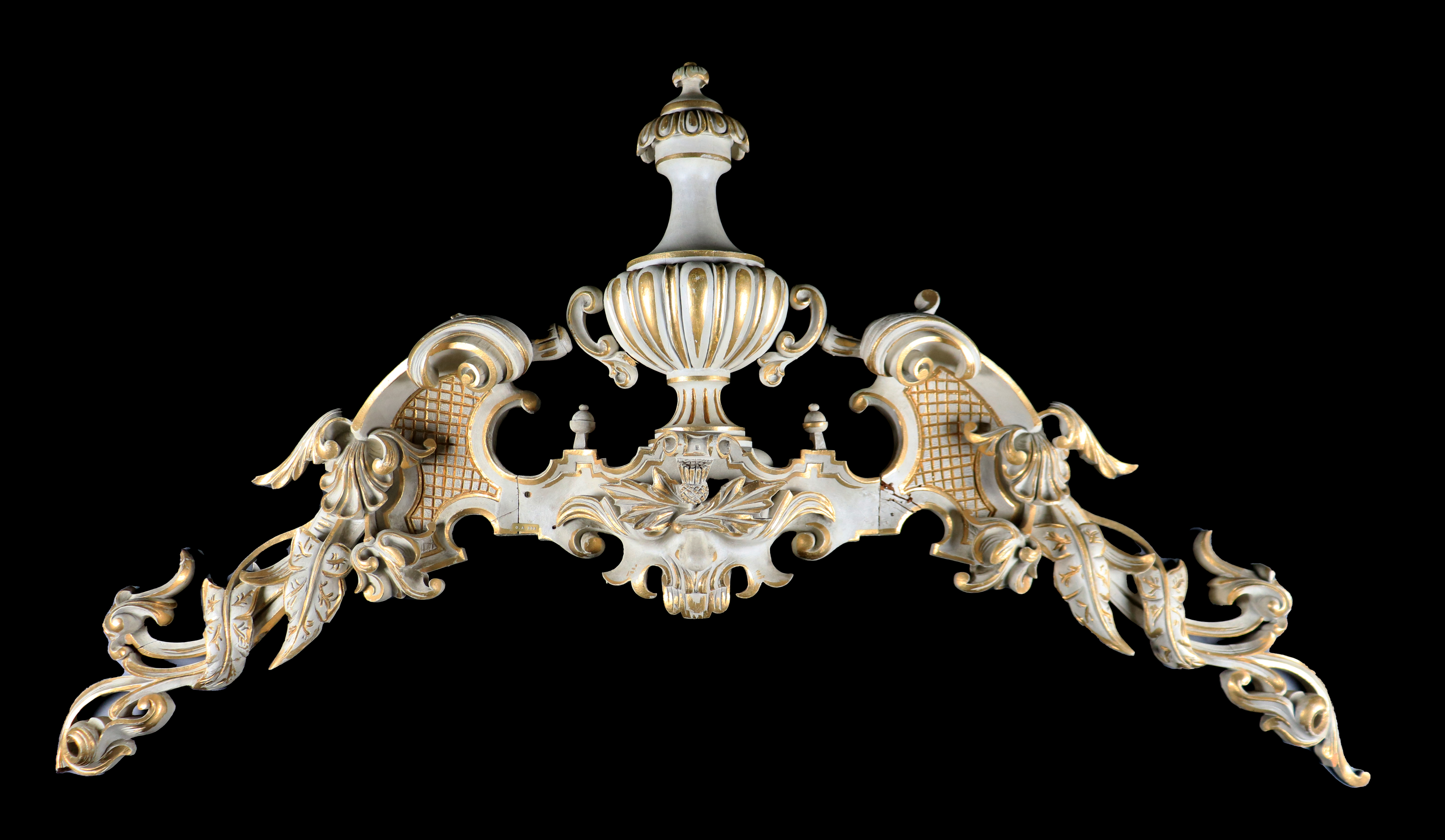

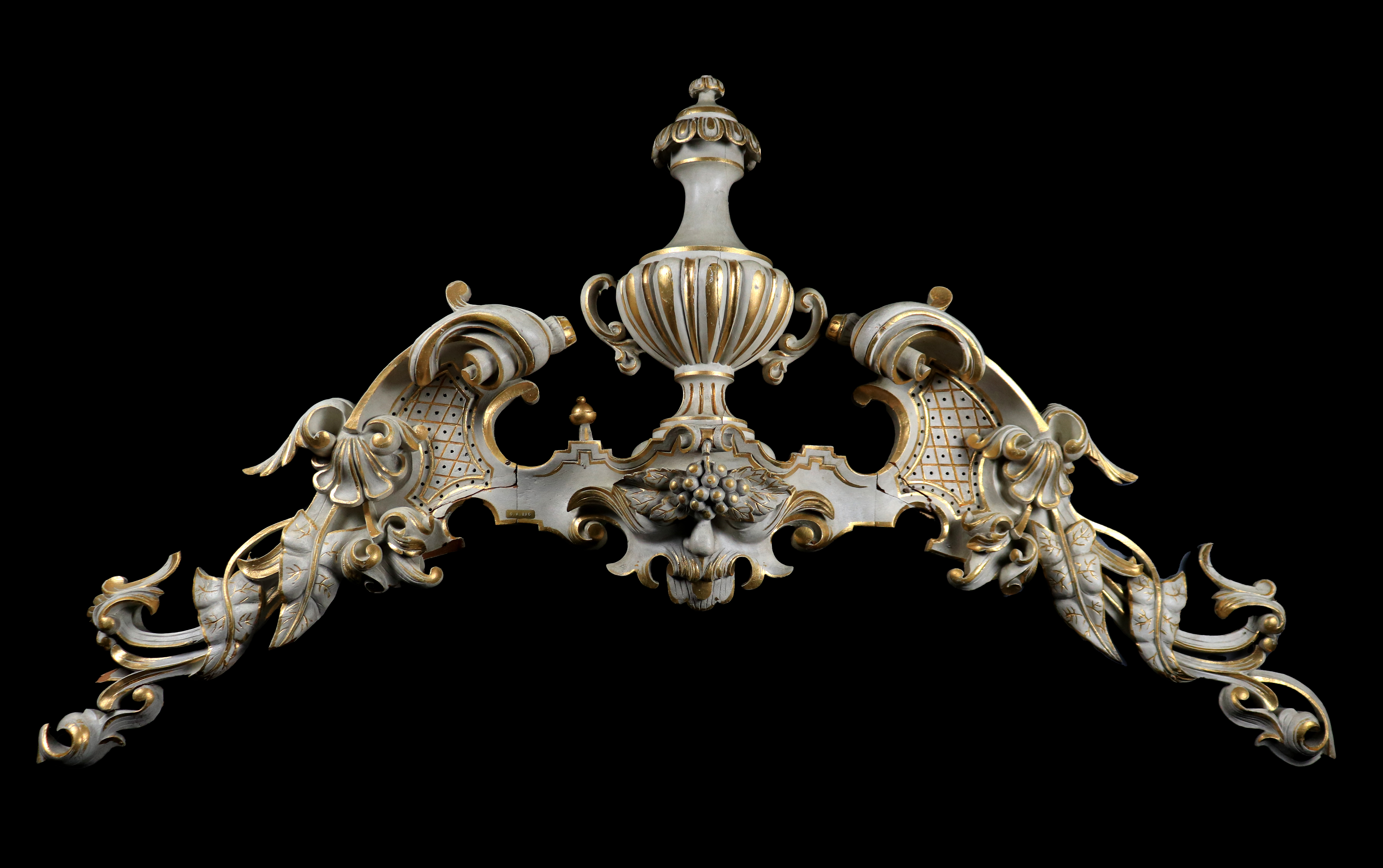

Conservatory
The conservatory was originally built around 1865 to the designs of Victor Roy of the architectural firm Fowler & Roy. It initially contained a vineyard, a Peach House, a fountain, an artificial grotto, and a potting house. In 1902, the greenhouse was completely rebuilt and enlarged by the Lord & Burnham Co. Located southwest of the ballroom, beneath the minstrels' gallery, the entrance to the conservatory is distinguished primarily by its mosaic floor. Two doors open onto a raised platform offering a panoramic view of the entire conservatory. A semicircular marble staircase leads down into the conservatory. (Note: Wm. Notman & Son, « The visit of Prince Fushimi to Montreal », Halogénures d'argent sur verre; Procédé gélatino-argentique, The Standard (Illustrated Supplement), Vol. III, No. 24, 15 juin 1907, p.1 En ligne) The floor is made of black and white marble tiles. Beneath the glass dome is a fountain.

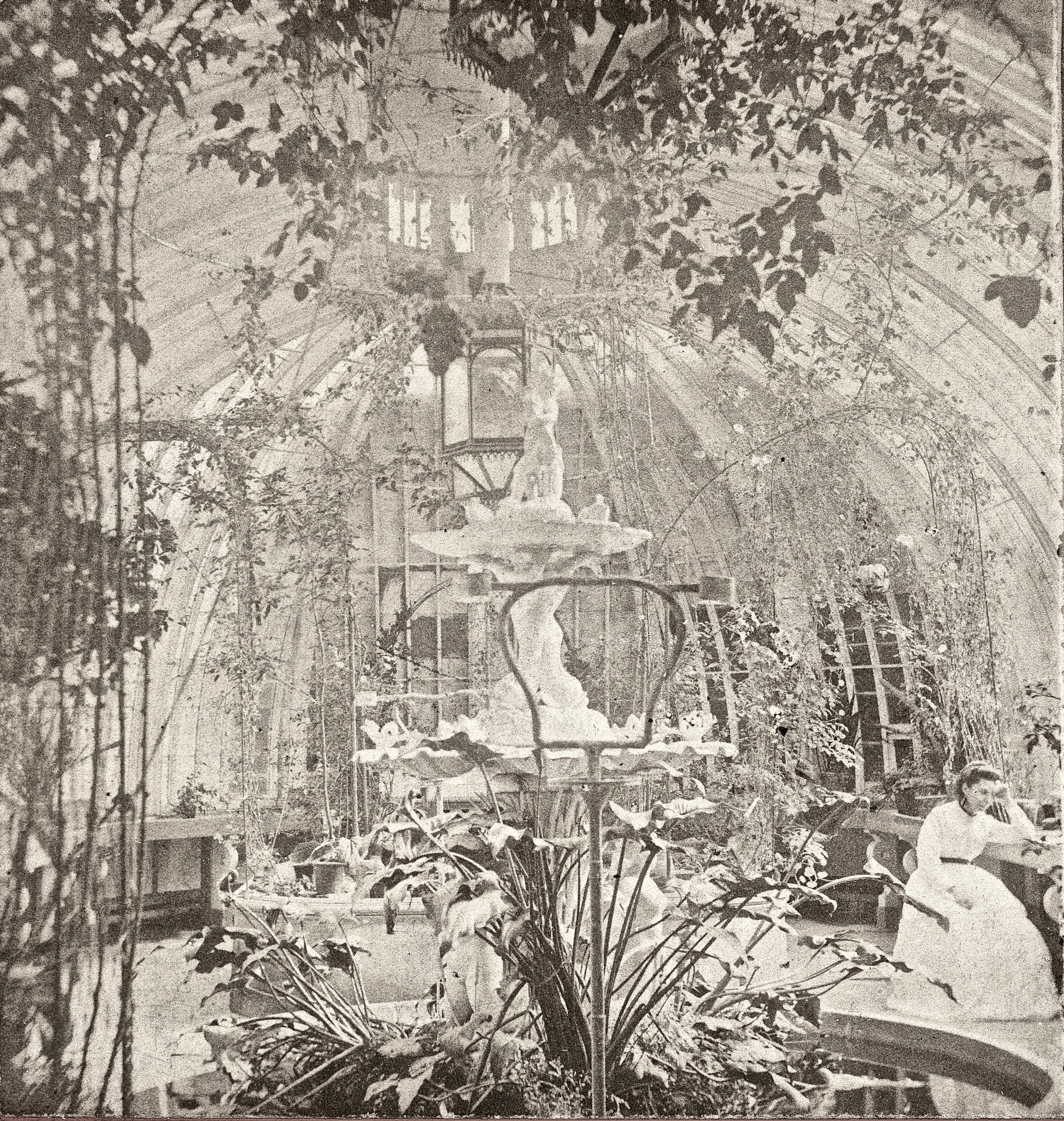
The conservatory under Hugh Allan (1870s)

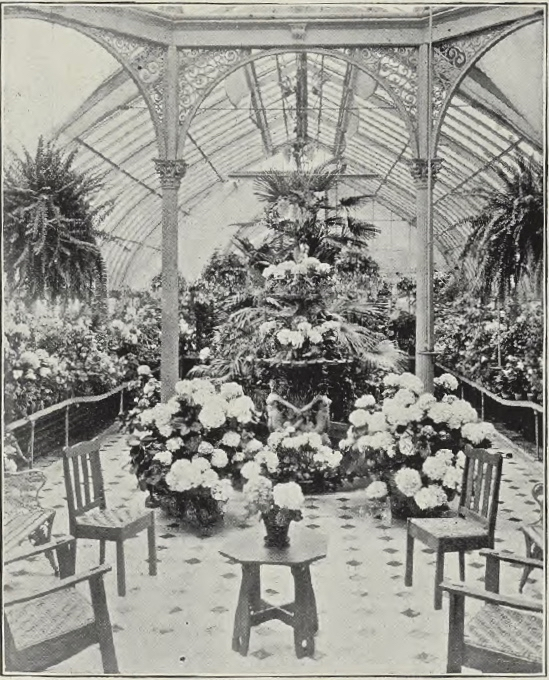
The conservatory under H. Montagu Allan (1906)

Library

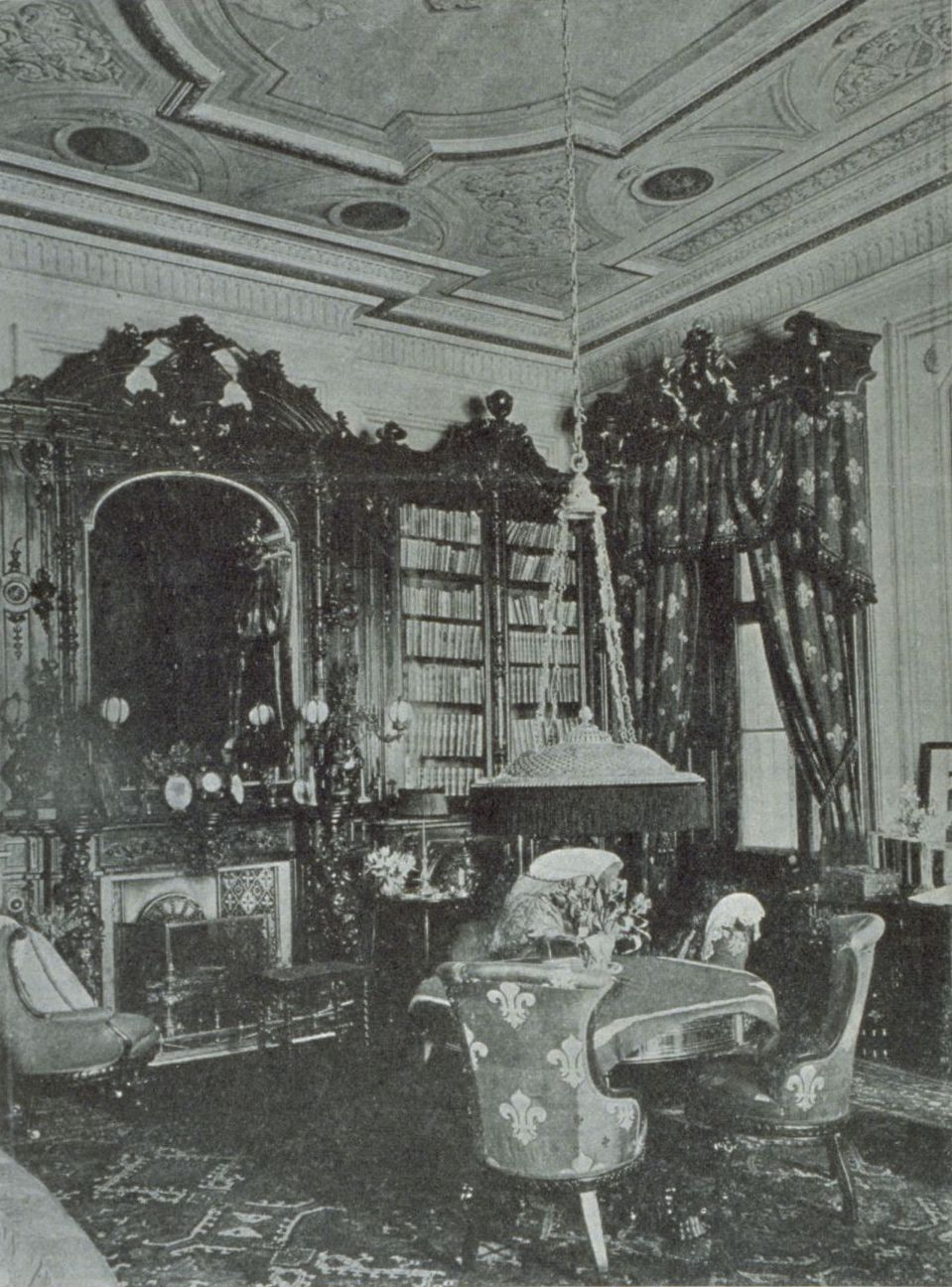
Library (1913)

Located northwest of the drawing room and southeast of the antechamber to the ballroom, the library was Hugh Allan's favorite room, where he spent hours working, relaxing, or spending time with his children. It was built in 1862 according to the plans of Victor Roy of the architectural firm of William Spier & Sons. Originally the first billiard room, its purpose changed definitively around 1865 when the new billiard room was built. The carved decoration (doors, moldings, etc.) was executed by the firm of carpenter and cabinetmaker George Roberts. In 1863, the painter Giuseppe Guidicini did all the paintings in this room, and the J. & W. Hilton firm of Montreal made all the furniture, including the bookcases that lined the entire southeast wall, on either side of the fireplace.

The bookcases, made of black walnut in the Italian Neo-Renaissance style, were possibly designed and crafted by Arthur Mingeaud, a French-born artist, sculptor, and draftsman employed by the J. & W. Hilton company at the time. The mantelpiece is primarily characterized by two caryatids supporting a console, above which is a mirror framed by two sea monsters. Above this mirror is a cartouche from which emerges the bust of Jacques Cartier. The mirror is then crowned by a broken pediment surmounted by an urn on a base. On either side of the fireplace are the bookcases. These consist, firstly, of shelves closed by doors on which sculpted reliefs symbolize, from left to right, Commerce, Fine Arts, Literature and History, and the State. Above these are the glass-fronted shelves, each crowned by a circular pediment surmounted by a globe.

In Hugh Allan's time, this room also contained, among other things, a black walnut table and its eight chairs upholstered in a "dull red with a gold fleur-de-lis pattern" damask to match the curtains, three pairs of curtains and their carved and gilded wooden galleries, a black walnut writing desk, a black walnut card table, a bronze pendant light and its eight bronze wall sconces, a "small" black walnut bookcase surmounted by a mirror, two paintings on canvas, several bronze sculpted groups, a sofa and six Chinese porcelain vases. (Note: Notorial Act, minute no. 17456, January 16, 1883, A.N.Q., p. 26)

==== First floor ====
After 1899, the first floor had three main bedrooms, each with its own dressing room, a boudoir, two bathrooms, two further bedrooms (one of which could be used as a children's dining room on occasion) and a corridor leading to the stairwell and the servants' quarters.

Distinguished Guest Apartment

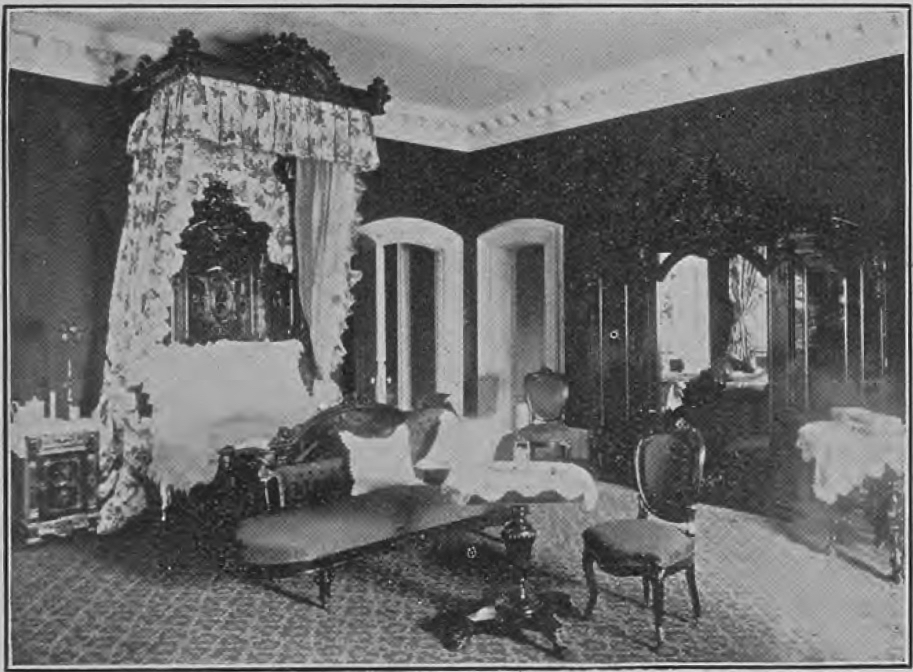
The distinguished guest bedroom at Ravenscrag in 1906

The guest apartment is located in the southwest corner of the residence, at the far end of the corridor from the main staircase. It was built in 1862 according to plans by Victor Roy of the architectural firm of William Spier & Sons. The entrance opens into a vestibule which leads to the master bedroom, as well as its dressing room and private bathroom. The master bedroom, situated in the corner of the building, has the most windows. Opposite to the bed, a double French door opens onto a balcony with a privileged view of the city. This room was fully furnished and decorated by the J. & W. Hilton company around 1867. It appears that this room also had access to the adjacent Louis XV style boudoir, decorated in pearl gray and pink.

==== Second floor ====
Around 1889, the second floor contained eight bedrooms for children, one with a closet, a storeroom, a linen room, and a bathroom with a hot water tank.

==== Attic ====
Around 1889, the tower contained an observatory in the attic. This room was surrounded by windows placed at the ridge of the roof.

== East wing or Servants' quarters ==
The servants' quarters once occupied the entire east wing of the residence. An entrance located on the east wall of the house was reserved for servants and was separate from the main entrance. Moreover, internal stairs were provided to avoid the servants having to go through the main stairs of the house. This wing is 14 m (46 ft) wide and nearly 6.1 m (20 ft) deep. It should not be forgotten that the basement of the residence completed the east wing. Hugh Allan sometimes said that he maintained a servants' hotel. The residence once employed nearly 19 servants.

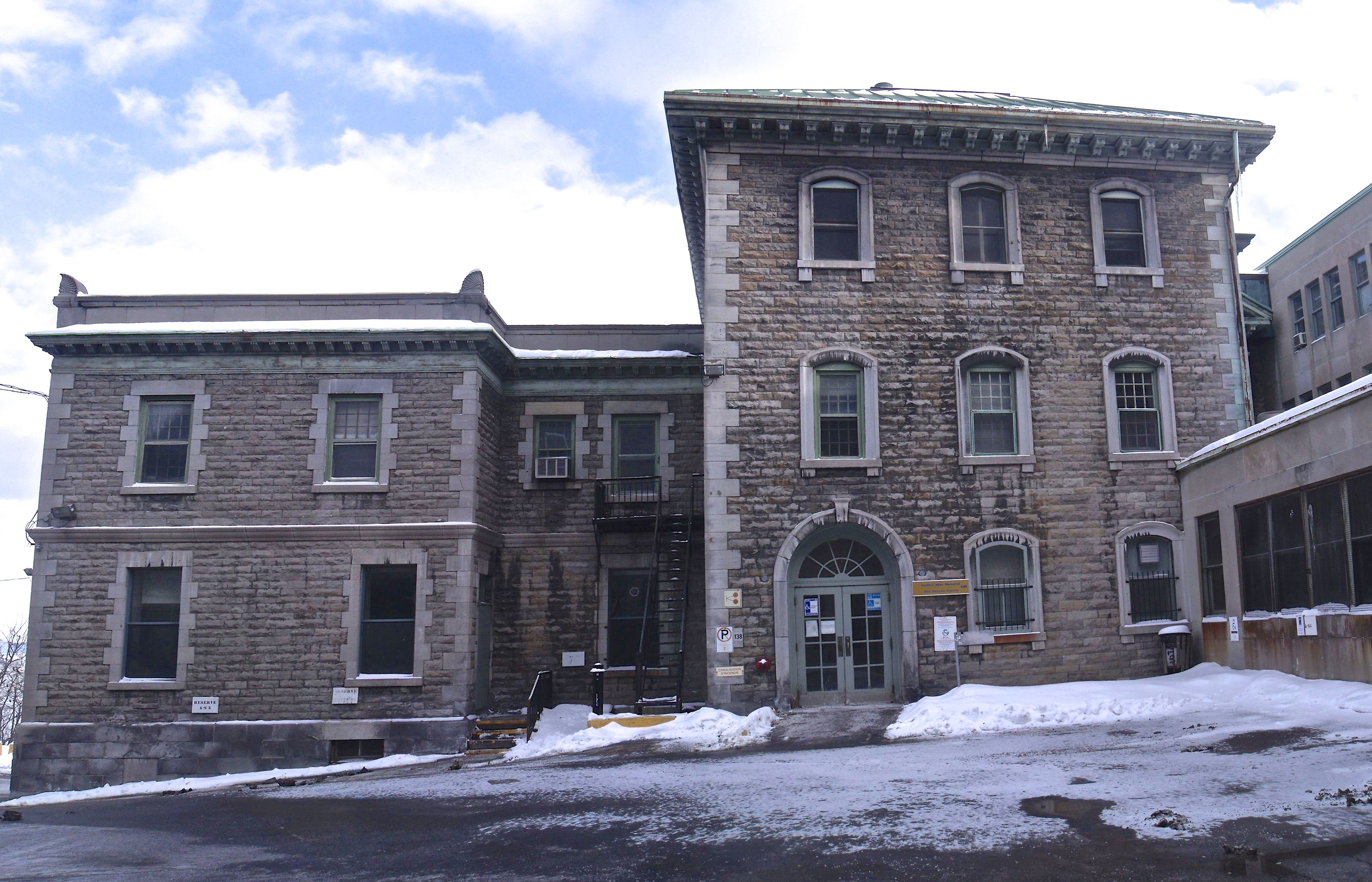
Gatehouse (2012)

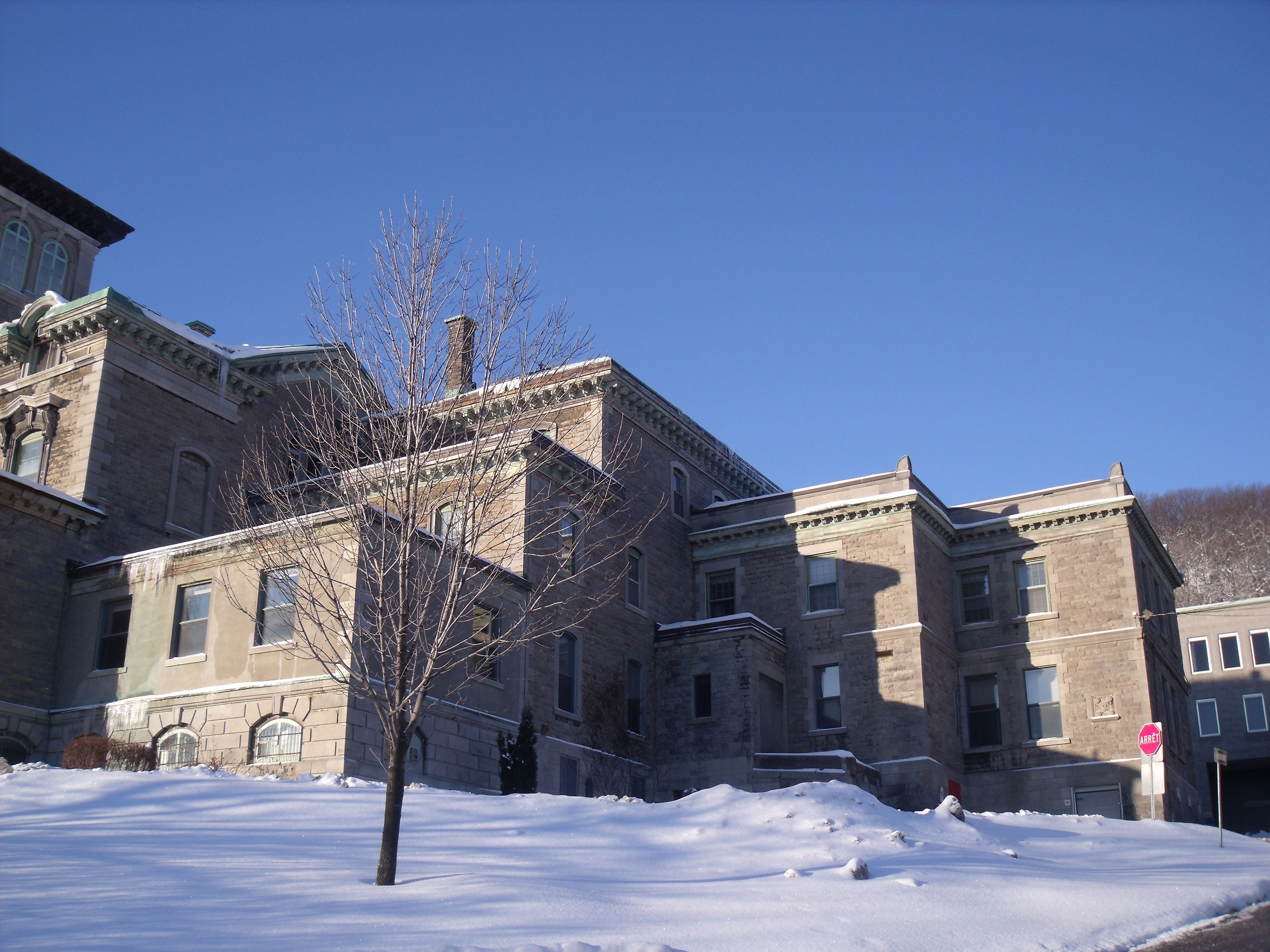
Gatehouse (2012)

== Gate House ==
The Ravenscrag Gatehouse is unique in Montreal, as gatekeepers are rather rare within the Golden Square Mile. It is located near the monumental gate overlooking Pine Avenue West. This building has the same architectural style as the main house, as well as all its main architectural elements, such as the bracketed cornice and the stonework highlighted by cut stone at the corners and around the windows. It is, however, much less ornate than the main residence. The small house is nonetheless no less well-kept: being near the gate, it "must do credit to the owner of the land".

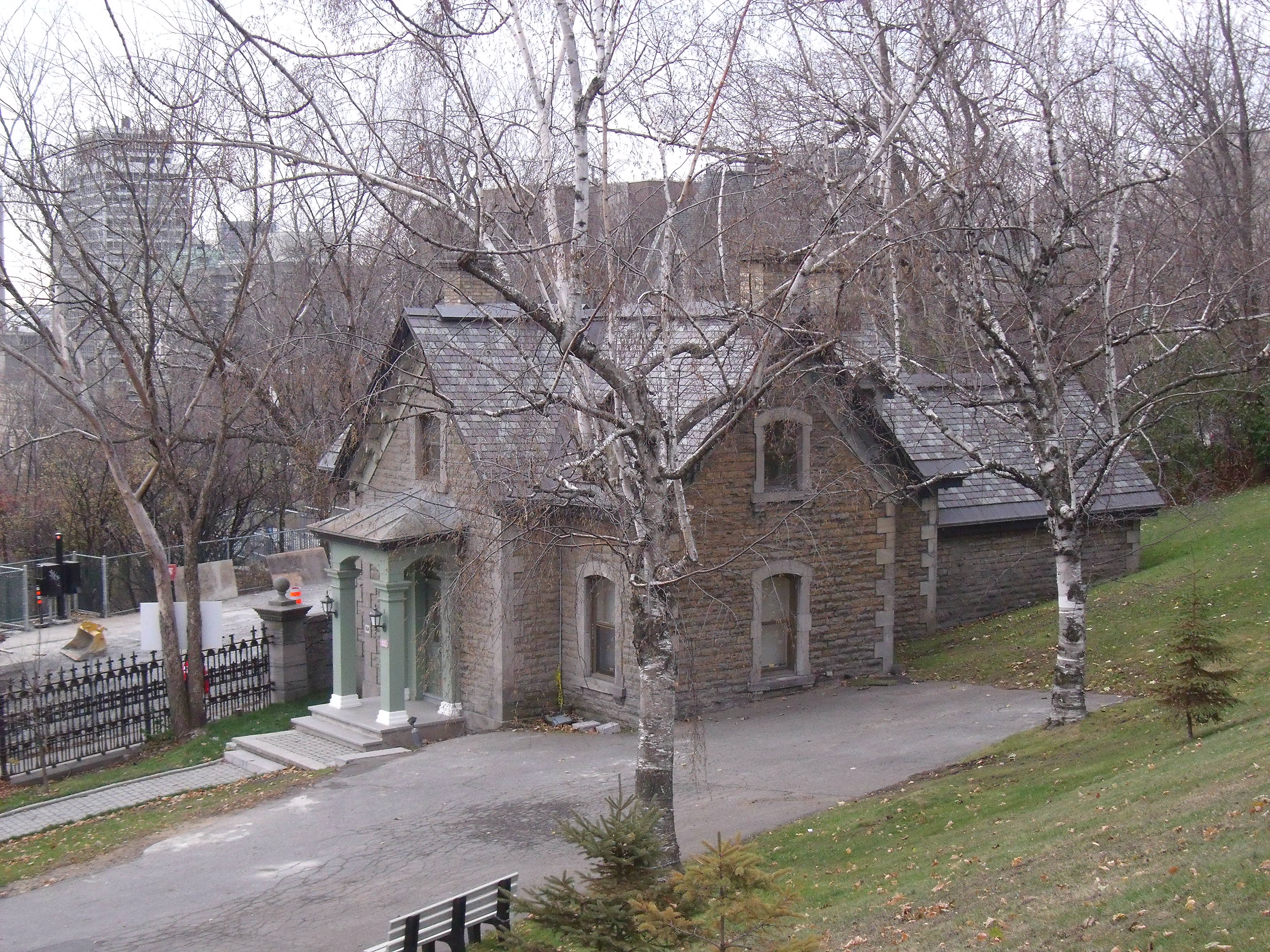
Gatehouse (2012)

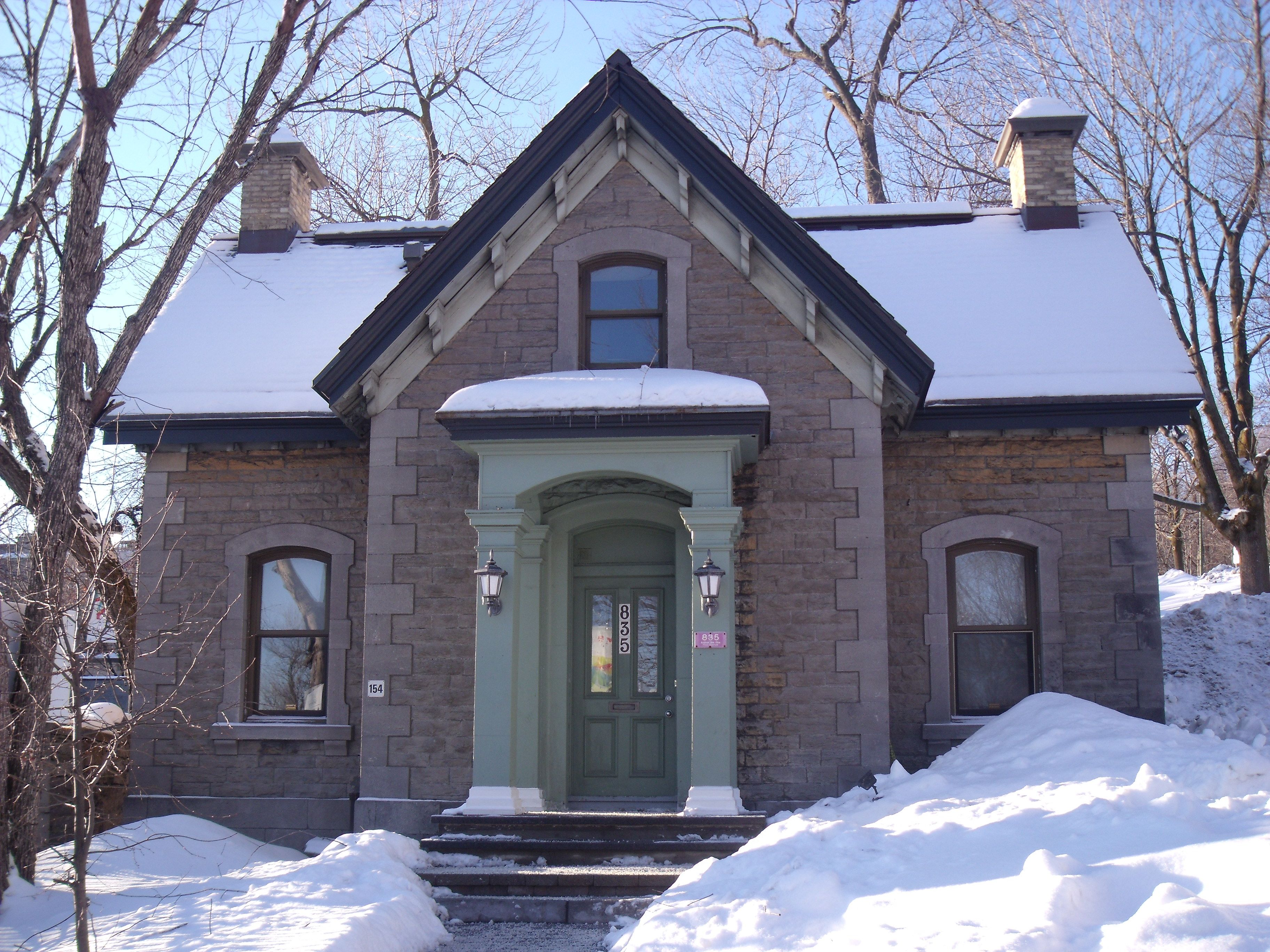
Gatehouse (2012)

== Stable ==
The stable visible today is the one that followed the alterations initiated by Hugh Montagu Allan in 1898. The alterations made to the stable demonstrate Hugh Montagu Allan's passion for horses. The main entrance is noticeable: horses and carriages once passed through this double gate, which follows a keystone arch in the shape of a horse's head. On either side of this keystone are the two years of construction of the stable: "1861" for the initial construction under Hugh Allan and "1898" for the alterations made under Hugh Montagu Allan. A pair of columns with Ionic capitals supports a pediment pierced by an oval window above which is a clock that is no longer functional. The stable is then crowned with a neoclassical-style dome.

According to plans drawn up by architects Andrew Taylor and George William Gordon in the 1890s, the stable originally built under Hugh Allan included the following rooms on the ground floor: the Stalls, where each horse had its name engraved on a plaque installed in its designated stall, the Harness Room, and a horse manger. In the attic, or upstairs, were the following rooms: a large attic with a light shaft through the floor to diffuse light into the stable, a bedroom for the coachman or chauffeur, a small parlor, a bathroom, and a small Cow Stable.

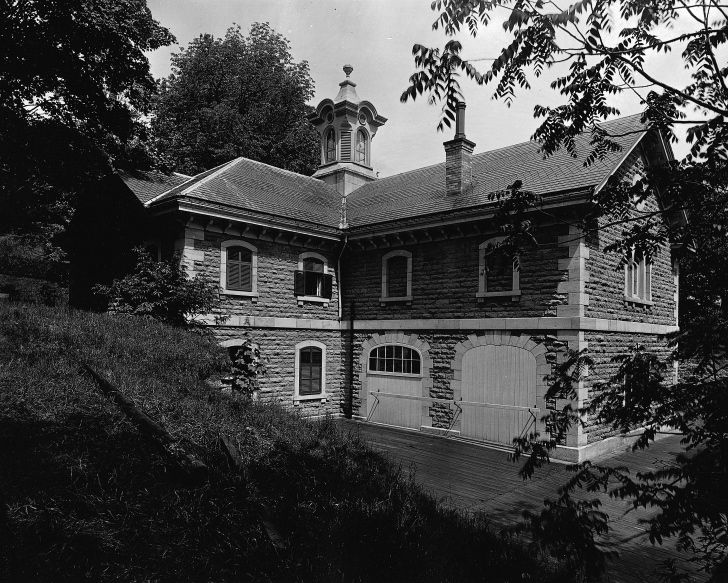
The stable of Hugh Allan (1889)

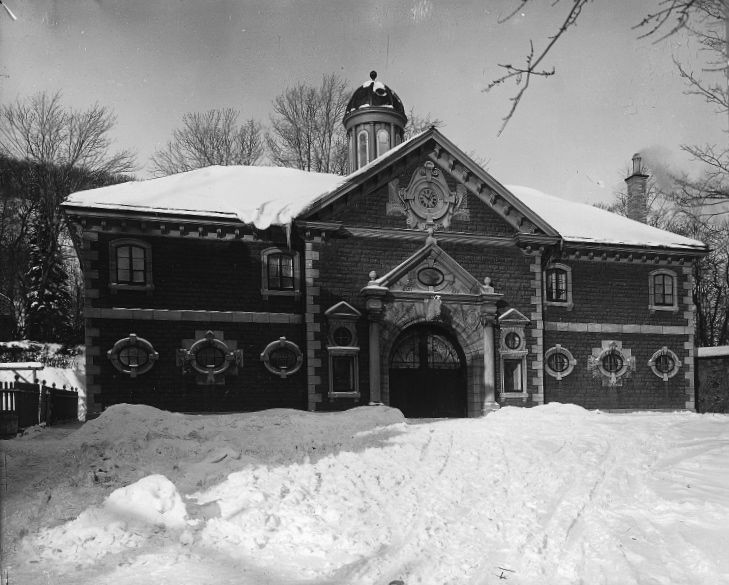
The sable of Hugh Montagu Allan (1903)

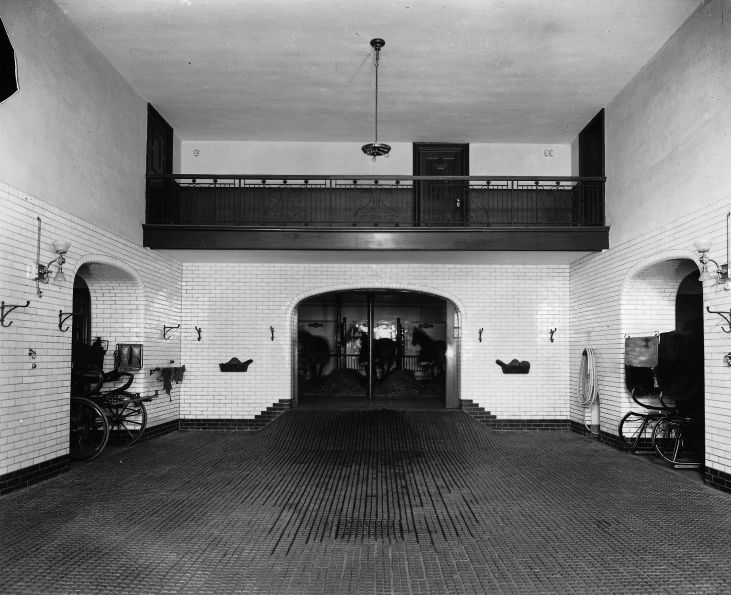
The main hall of the stable (1903)

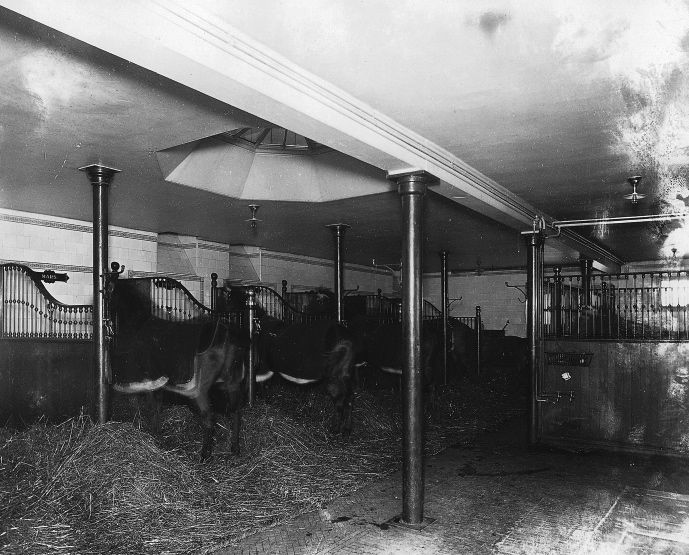
The stables (1903)

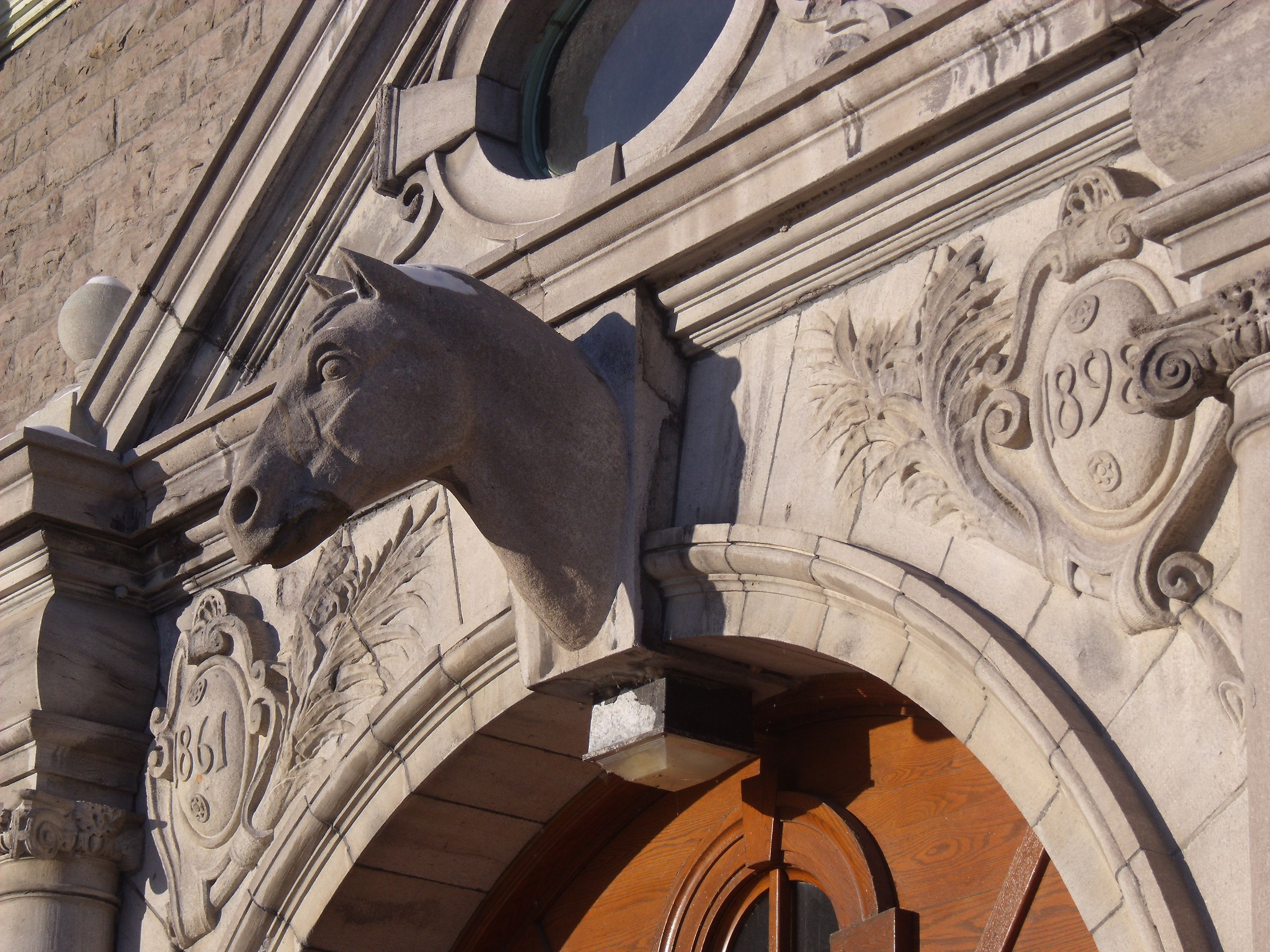
Horse head shaped keystone (2012)

== Sources ==
=== Books / Works ===
List of books in chronological order of publication :

- W. S. Mackay, Robert, ed. (1859–1870). The Montreal Directory. Montreal, Quebec: John Lovell. Lovell.
- Longmoore, M., ed. (1864). Montreal Business Sketches with a Description of the City of Montreal : its public buildings and places of interest, and the Grand Trunk works at Point St. Charles, Victoria Bridge &c., &c. Montreal, Quebec: Canada Railway Advertising Company. Longmoore.
- Views of Montreal : Nelson's View - Book for Tourists. Vol. 1. Montreal, Quebec: (Unknown publisher). 1868. BFT-1868.
- Dent, John Charles (1880). The Canadian Portrait Gallery. Sir Hugh Allan. Toronto (ON), Canada: John B. Magurn. p. 38. JDC-1880.
- The Canadian album : men of Canada. Or, Success by example, in religion, patriotism, business, law, medicine, education and agriculture : Victor Roy. Vol. II. Brantford, Bradley, Garrestson & Co. 1893. p. 147.
- Girouard, Mark (1971). The Victorian Country House. Oxford: Carlenton Press. Girouard.
- Gersovitz, Julia (1975). Ravenscrag. Montreal, Quebec: McGill University, School of Architecture. Gersovitz.
- Dictionary of Canadian Biography (1881-1890). Toronto, Ontario: University of Toronto Press. 1976.
- Lemire, Robert (1979). Inventaire des bâtiments du Vieux-Montréal et des quartiers Saint-Georges et Saint-André (in French). Montreal, Quebec: Parcs Canada. Lemire.
- du Prey, Pierre; Ellen, James (1983). Lambert, Phyllis (ed.). Huit villas sur le Mont-Royal (in French). Montreal, Quebec: Centre canadien d'architecture. Lambert.
- Bianchini, Robert (1985). Ravenscrag. Montreal, Quebec: McGill University, School of Architecture. Bianchini.
- Rémillard, François (1986). Demeures bourgeoises de Montréal : le Mille carré, 1850-1930 : Maison Hugh-Allan (in French). Montreal, Quebec: Édition du Méridien. pp. 55–57. ISBN 2-920417-08-8. Rémillard-1986.
- Communauté Urbaine de Montréal (1987). Répertoire d'architecture traditionnelle sur le territoire de la Communauté Urbaine de Montréal : Les résidences (in French). Vol. 1. Montreal, Quebec: Service de la planification du territoire (CUM). ISBN 2-920295-56-X. CUM.
- Pinard, Guy (1987). Montréal, son histoire, son architecture : Ravenscrag (in French). Vol. 2. Montreal, Quebec: Éditions La presse. ISBN 2-89043-255-6.
- Gauthier, Raymonde (1987). L'Architecture de Montréal : Maison Hugh-Allan, dite Ravenscrag (in French). Montreal, Quebec: Libre Expression : Ordre des architectes du Québec. p. 84. ISBN 2-89111-426-4.
- Porter, John R., ed. (1993). Un art de vivre : le meuble de goût à l'époque victorienne au Québec : Ravenscrag, la plus somptueuse résidence montréalaise de l'époque victorienne (in French). Montreal, Quebec: Musée des beaux-arts de Montréal; Musée de la civilisation de Québec. ISBN 2-89192-160-7. JRP.
- Sourkes, Theodore Lionel (1995). Building on a Proud Past : 50 Years of Psychiatry at McGill. Montreal, Quebec: Dept. of psychiatry, McGill University. ISBN 2-9800963-4-2. Sourkes.
- Blondel-Loisel, Annie (2009). La compagnie maritime Allan : de l'Écosse au Canada au XIXe siècle (in French). Montreal, Quebec: Harmattan. ISBN 978-2-296-10029-9.
- Rémillard, François (2016). Belles demeures historiques de l'île de Montréal : Ravenscrag (in French). Montreal, Quebec: Harmattan. p. 195. ISBN 978-2-7619-4428-1. Rémillard-2016.
- Palmer, Arlene (April 15, 2026). Bold, Designing Fellows’: Italian Decorative and Scenic Artists in Nineteenth-Century America. Lewes, UK: D. Giles Limited. p. 207. ISBN 978-0-00000-000-2. APS.

=== Notarial Acts ===
List of notorial acts in chronological order of publication :

- Smith, James (Notary) (August 10, 1853). Notorial Act en minute, min. no. 821 : "Hugh Allan, Esquire, to Alexander Rae : Deed of Sale". Notaries Records, Judicial District of Montreal: Superior Court Funds, National Archives of Quebec (microfilm M-620.1496). AN-821.
- Smith, James (Notary) (October 29, 1860). Notorial Act en minute, min. no. 7081 : "Deed of Sale : William Spier & James Spier to Hugh Allan, Esquire". Notaries Records, Judicial District of Montreal: Superior Court Funds, National Archives of Quebec (microfilm M-620.1505). AN-7081.
- Smith, James (Notary) (May 27, 1861). Notorial Act en minute, min. no. 7929 : "Contract and agreement between Messrs. Wilson Company and Hugh Allan, Esquire". Notaries Records, Judicial District of Montreal: Superior Court Funds, National Archives of Quebec (microfilm M-620.1506). AN-7929.
- Smith, James (Notary) (May 27, 1861). Notorial Act en minute, min. no. 7932 : "Contract and agreement between Messrs. Wand and Jackson and Hugh Allan, Esquire". Notaries Records, Judicial District of Montreal: Superior Court Funds, National Archives of Quebec (microfilm M-620.1506). AN-7932.
- Smith, James (Notary) (July 30, 1861). Notorial Act en minute, min. no. 8136 : "Contract and agreement between Mr. George Roberts and Hugh Allan, Esquire". Notaries Records, Judicial District of Montreal: Superior Court Funds, National Archives of Quebec (microfilm M-620.1506). AN-8136.
- Smith, James (Notary) (March 26, 1863). Notorial Act en minute, min. no. 10281 : "Allan, Hugh to Andrew Allan : Lease". Notaries Records, Judicial District of Montreal: Superior Court Funds, National Archives of Quebec (microfilm M-620.1506). AN-10281.
- Stewart Hunter, James (Notary) (March 13, 1869). Notorial Act en minute, min. no. 14741 : "Lease and Agreement to & between Hugh Allan, Esq., and Mr. James Thomson". Notaries Records, Judicial District of Montreal: Superior Court Funds, National Archives of Quebec (Classification number: CN601, S208). AN-14741.
- Cushing, Charles (Notary) (January 16, 1883). Notorial Act en minute, min. no. 17456 : "Inventory of the Estate of the late Sir Hugh Allan, Knight". Notaries Records, Judicial District of Montreal: Superior Court Funds, National Archives of Quebec (Classification number: CN601, S438). AN-17456.
- Bayne McLean, Herbert (Notary) (November 19, 1940). Notorial Act en minute, min. no. 488283 : "Gift inter vivos". Long act, land district: "Montréal Ancien": Registre foncier du Québec. AN-488283.

=== Judicial documents ===
- Judgment No. 1538: “Emily Caton, Plaintiff vs Hugh Allan, Dfnd”, General Civil Matters, Montreal Registry, Judicial District of Montreal, Superior Court Fund, National Archives of Quebec in Montreal (Cote : TP11, S2, SS2, SSS42, D1538).
- Registration No. 107815: “Last Will and Testament of Sir Hugh Allan, Knight”, will before witnesses, drawn up by the Honourable John Jos Caldwell Abbott, lawyer, in Montreal, on June 25, 1880 (with codicil dated October 7, 1880), homologated and registered by the Superior Court on January 10, 1883, Judicial District of Montreal, Superior Court Fund, National Archives of Quebec in Montreal (Cote : CT601, S1).
- Registration No. 122353 : “Deed of donation upon death”, approved and registered by the Superior Court on May 20, 1892, Judicial District of Montreal, Superior Court Fund, National Archives of Quebec in Montreal.

=== Statutes, regulations and decrees ===
- Règlement constituant le site du patrimoine du Mont-Royal [Regulation establishing the Mount Royal heritage site] (Regulation 7593) (in French). City Council of the City of Montreal (Quebec). December 15, 1987. REG-7593.
- Règlement révisant le plan d'urbanisme de la ville de Montréal [Regulation revising the urban planning plan of the City of Montreal] (Regulation 04-047) (in French). City Council of the City of Montreal (Quebec). December 10, 2004. REG-04-047.
- André Dicaire (Court clerk of the Executive Council) (March 9, 2005). Déclaration de l'arrondissement historique et naturel du Mont-Royal [Declaration of the historic and natural district of Mount Royal] (PDF). Official Gazette of Quebec (Decree 190-2005). Quebec City (Qc): Government of Quebec. D-2005.
- Règlement autorisant la démolition, la construction, la transformation et l'occupation de bâtiments ainsi que l'aménagement des espaces extérieurs sur le site de l'hôpital Royal Victoria [Regulations authorizing the demolition, construction, conversion and occupation of buildings and the development of outdoor spaces on the site of the Royal Victoria Hospital] (Regulation 21-032) (in French). City Council of the City of Montreal (Quebec). January 6, 2023. REG-21-032.
- Règlement modifiant le Plan d'urbanisme de la Ville de Montréal [By-law amending the Urban Planning Plan of the City of Montreal] (Regulation 04-047-223) (in French). City Council of the City of Montreal (Quebec). January 6, 2023. REG-04-047-223.

=== Administrative Publications ===
- Assessment rolls for the Saint-Antoine Ward, City of Montreal. Montreal (Qc), Canada: Municipal Archives of the City of Montreal (Cote: CA M001 VM036-3-4). 1841–1917. AMVM.
- Registre foncier du Québec : Before July 20, 1999 : lots no. 1800, 1800-1 (Saint-Antoine Ward, City of Montreal). After July 20, 1999 : lots 1341184 and 1341185 (Montreal, Cadaster of Quebec). Long act, land district: "Montréal Ancien": Ministère des Ressources Naturelles et Faune. 1841–2025. RFQ.
- Land Management - Permits (Borough Ville-Marie) : 1025, Pine Ave West. Montreal (QC), Canada: City of Montreal. 1926–2025. PermitsMtl.
- L. Heenan, Roy (president); Fraser, Joan (commissar); Yergeau, Michel (commissar) (2001). Rapport : Comité Consultatif sur l'utilisation des bâtiments existants du Centre universitaire de santé McGil (in French). Montreal, Quebec: Comité Consultatif du Centre universitaire de santé McGill. p. 50. RAP-CUSM.
- "Institut Allan Memorial - Hôpital Royal Victoria (Bâtiment résidentiel)". Official Website of Royal Mountain (City of Montreal). Montreal (Qc), Canada: City of Montreal.
- Lessard, Marie; Charlebois, Cameron; Corbeau, Claude; McGregor, James (March 31, 2024). Un héritage patrimonial porteur d'avenir (2e rapport) : bâtiments situés dans le Site patrimonial du Mont-Royal (PDF) (in French). Montreal, Quebec: Groupe d'experts sur l'avenir des bâtiments hospitaliers excédentaires de Montréal. p. 90. RAP-MTL2014.
- Montpetit, Marie (Minister) (2018). Plan de conservation du site patrimonial du Mont-Royal (in French). Quebec City, Quebec: Ministère de la culture et des communications. p. 174. ISBN 978-2-550-81609-6. PLAN-2018.
- Gersovitz, Julia (May 10, 2019). Étude historique complémentaire du site de l'ancienne résidence Ravenscrag (Allan Memorial) (PDF) (in French). Montreal, Quebec: EVOQ Architecture. p. 76. JG.
- Caron, Françoise (Urban Planning Counsellor) (August 29, 2019). Énoncé de l'intérêt patrimonial du site de l'institut Allan Memorial (Ancienne villa Ravenscrag) : 687-1033, avenue des Pins Ouest (arrondissement de Ville-Marie) (in French). Montreal, Quebec: City of Montreal, Urban Planning and Mobility Department, Heritage Division. p. 16. EIP-2019.
- Paré, Jean (president of the Jacques-Viger Committee); Jacobs, Peter (president of the Conseil du patrimoine de Montréal (May 21, 2021). Avis : Site de l’ancien Hôpital Royal Victoria et de l’Institut Allan Memorial AC21-VM-01 (PDF) (in French). Montreal, Quebec: Conseil du patrimoine de Montréal et du Comité Jacques-Viger, Ville de Montréal. p. 12. AVIS-2021.
- Beaulieu (President), Isabelle (May 10, 2022). Site de l'ancien Hôpital Royal Victoria : projets de règlement P-21-032 et P-04-047-223 : rapport de consultation publique (in French). Montreal, Quebec: Office de consultation publique de Montréal. p. 180. ISBN 978-2-925161-14-1. OCP-2022.
- Roditi (Lawyer, Borden Ladner Gervais S.E.N.C.R.L., S.R.L.), Raphael (November 17, 2023). Act Number 28 396 697 : Notice of publication of rights resulting from a commercial lease (Section 2999.1 C.C.Q.) (in French). Montreal (Qc), Canada: Office de la publicité des droits / Registre foncier du Québec. p. 2. BAIL-2023.

=== Geographical Map ===
- Perreault, H. M. (December 21, 1853). Plan of Property Situate on Sherbrooke Street Montreal Belonging to John Torrance and James Hutchison, Esqrs : Showing its Subdivision into Lots. Montreal: H. M. Perrault, Provincial Land Surveyor. p. 1. Perreault-1853.

=== Newspaper Articles ===
List of periodical articles in chronological order:

- "The sale of the "McTavish Lot"". Montreal Herald and Daily Commercial Gazette (Newspaper). Vol. 45, no. 225 (Robert Weir ed.). Montreal. November 24, 1853. p. 2.
- "Personnal : Villa Residence of Henry Lyman". Montreal Herald and Daily Commercial Gazette (Newspaper). Vol. 51, no. 266 (Robert Weir ed.). Montreal. November 8, 1859. p. 2.
- "The Lost of the "Hungarian"". Montreal Herald and Daily Commercial Gazette (Newspaper). Vol. 52, no. 70 (Robert Weir ed.). Montreal. March 22, 1860. p. 2.
- "How a Prince Should be Entertained : the interior of the building". Montreal Herald and Daily Commercial Gazette (Newspaper). Vol. 52, no. 191 (Robert Weir ed.). Montreal. August 10, 1860. p. 2.
- "The McTavish Castle". The Daily Witness (Newspaper). Vol. 1, no. 8 (John Dougall ed.). Montreal. December 7, 1860. p. 2.
- "Fowler et Roy, Architectes : successeurs de W. Speir et Fils". L'Ordre : union catholique (Newspaper) (in French). Vol. 3, no. 112 (Plinguet & Laplante ed.). Montreal. August 28, 1861. p. 2.
- "List of buildings erected during the year 1861. Under the Superintendance of Wm. Speir & Son, architects : McTavish Street". Montreal Herald and Daily Commercial Gazette (Newspaper). Vol. 54, no. 47 (Robert Weir ed.). Montreal. February 24, 1862. p. 7.
- "Faits divers". L'Ordre : union catholique (Newspaper) (in French). Vol. 4, no. 118 (Plinguet & Laplante ed.). Montreal. September 12, 1862. p. 2.
- "Prince of Wale's Wedding : Celebration in Montreal. Illuminations". Montreal Herald and Daily Commercial Gazette (Newspaper). Vol. 55, no. 59 (Robert Weir ed.). Montreal. March 11, 1863. p. 2.
- "The Exhibition : Industrial Department". Montreal Herald and Daily Commercial Gazette (Newspaper). Vol. 15, no. 221 (Robert Weir ed.). Montreal. September 16, 1863. p. 2.
- "The Exhibition : Industrial Department (omission)". Montreal Herald and Daily Commercial Gazette (Newspaper). Vol. 57, no. 233 (Robert Weir ed.). Montreal. September 30, 1865. p. 1.
- "Progress of Montreal. New Public and Prive Buildings : Upper Peel Street". Montreal Herald and Daily Commercial Gazette (Newspaper). Vol. 57, no. 301 (Robert Weir ed.). Montreal. December 19, 1865. p. 1.
- "Midnight Dispatches. New Dry Goods Store". Montreal Herald and Daily Commercial Gazette (Newspaper). Vol. 58, no. 78 (Robert Weir ed.). Montreal. April 2, 1866. p. 2.
- "Gasaliers : R. Sharpley offers a sale on large stock of the Finest Cut Glass Gasaliers". Montreal Herald and Daily Commercial Gazette (Newspaper). Vol. 58, no. 269 (Robert Weir ed.). Montreal. November 10, 1866. p. 2.
- "Progress of Montreal (Illustrated Edition) : Merchants' Bank". Montreal Herald and Daily Commercial Gazette (Newspaper). Vol. 59, no. (Double Sheet) (Robert Weir ed.). Montreal. March 1, 1867. p. 6.
- "Faits divers : Manufacture de meubles de MM. Hilton". Le Pays (Newspaper) (in French). Vol. 16, no. 35. Montreal. April 6, 1867. p. 2.
- "Faits divers : Fabrique de M. Hilton". Le Pays (Newspaper) (in French). Vol. 39, no. 175. Montreal. April 6, 1867. p. 2.
- "Special Notices : Wedding". The Daily Witness (Newspaper). Vol. 8, no. 122 (John Dougall ed.). Montreal. May 23, 1867. p. 3.
- "Heating by Hot Water and Steam (Ad)". Montreal Herald and Daily Commercial Gazette (Newspaper). Vol. 59, no. 245 (Robert Weir ed.). Montreal. October 14, 1867. p. 2.
- "J. & W. Hilton (Ad) : Fabricants de meubles et décorateurs". La Minerve (Newspaper) (in French). Vol. 42, no. 68 (Augustin-Norbert Morin ed.). Montreal. November 27, 1869. p. 3.
- "Nouvelles locales : Beau monde". L'événement (Newspaper) (in French). Vol. 3, no. 166. Montreal. December 2, 1869. p. 2.
- "Sir Hugh Allan of Ravenscrag". The Globe (Newspaper). Vol. 10, no. 185 (The Globe and Mail ed.). August 2, 1871. p. 2.
- "City Items : Sir Hugh Allan of Ravenscrag". The Daily Witness (Newspaper). Vol. 10, no. 185 (John Dougall ed.). Montreal. August 8, 1871. p. 3.
- "Latest from Montreal : Competition for the best cultivated gardens". Morning Chronicle and Commercial and Shipping Gazette (Newspaper) (Charles St. Michel ed.). Montreal. August 22, 1871. p. 2.
- "City Items : Guests at Ravenscrag". The Daily Witness (Newspaper). Vol. 11, no. 147 (John Dougall ed.). Montreal. June 20, 1872. p. 3.
- "Local News : Agricultural and Horticultural Society's Show". Morning Chronicle and Commercial and Shipping Gazette (Newspaper). Vol. 26, no. 150 (Charles St. Michel ed.). Montreal. September 13, 1872. p. 2.
- "Nouvelles générales". Le Journal de Québec (Newspaper) (in French). Vol. 8, no. 117. Montreal. September 20, 1872. p. 2.
- "Faits divers : Bal à Montréal". L'évènement (Newspaper) (in French). Vol. 6, no. 150. Montreal. November 12, 1872. p. 2.
- "Nouvelles locales : Lord Dufferin". La Minerve (Newspaper) (in French). Vol. 45, no. 150 (Augustin-Norbert Morin ed.). Montreal. November 20, 1872. p. 2.
- "Ravenscrag". Montreal Weekly Witness Commercial Review and Family News Paper (Newspaper). Vol. 27, no. 61. Montreal. November 21, 1872. p. 1.
- "Ravenscrag". Canadian Illustrated News (Newspaper). Vol. 6, no. 22. Montreal. November 30, 1872. p. 339.
- "Ravenscrag". Canadian Illustrated News (Newspaper). Vol. 6, no. 23. Montreal. December 7, 1872. p. 355.
- "Ravenscrag". L’Opinion Publique (Newspaper) (in French). Vol. 3, no. 50. Montreal. December 12, 1872. pp. 592, 594.
- "Latest from Montreal : Marble Bust of Sir Hugh Allan". Morning Chronicle and Commercial and Shipping Gazette (Newspaper). Vol. 27, no. 10302 (Charles St. Michel ed.). Montreal. March 12, 1873. p. 2.
- "Editorial Notes : Sir Hugh Allan presented to the Queen". The Daily Witness (Newspaper). Vol. 12, no. 126 (John Dougall ed.). Montreal. May 27, 1873. p. 2.
- "Télégraphie générale : Mariage fashionable". L'événement (Newspaper) (in French). Vol. 9, no. 121. Montreal. October 7, 1875. p. 2.
- "The Vice-Regal Visit : The Princess visit to the Mountain". Montreal Herald and Daily Commercial Gazette (Newspaper). Vol. 70, no. 288 (Robert Weir ed.). Montreal. December 3, 1878. p. 2.
- "Bal at Raven Craig". Daily Evening Mercury (Newspaper). Vol. 75, no. 109 (George T. Cary ed.). May 9, 1879. p. 2.
- "Notes locales : Grand Bal". La Minerve (Newspaper) (in French). Vol. 51, no. 203 (Augustin-Norbert Morin ed.). Montreal. May 9, 1879. p. 1.
- "Death of Lady Allan : She Dies at Ravenscraig on Saturday Morning". The Globe (Newspaper). Vol. 75, no. 109 (The Globe and Mail ed.). June 13, 1881. p. 8.
- "Quebec : Montreal, Quebec, Sherbrooke. Lady Allan's Funerals". The Globe (Newspaper). Vol. 75, no. 111 (The Globe and Mail ed.). June 15, 1881. p. 1.
- "William Smith at Ravenscrag". Montreal Herald and Daily Commercial Gazette (Newspaper). Vol. 74, no. 159 (Robert Weir ed.). July 5, 1882. p. 7.
- "The Science Congress : The arrangement of proceedings, the excursions and entertainments (The Programme)". Montreal Herald and Daily Commercial Gazette (Newspaper). Vol. 74, no. 198 (Robert Weir ed.). August 19, 1882. p. 7.
- Charles St. Michel, ed. (December 11, 1882). "Death of Sir Hugh Allan". Morning Chronicle and Commercial and Shipping Gazette (Newspaper). Vol. 36, no. 13317. Montreal (Qc), Canada. p. 2.
- "Mort de Sir Hugh Allan". Le Journal des Trois-Rivières (Newspaper) (in French). Vol. 18, no. 57. Three-Rivers (Qc), Canada. December 11, 1882. p. 1.
- "The late Sir Hugh Allan : The last sad rites". Montreal Herald and Daily Commercial Gazette (Newspaper). Vol. 74, no. 310 (Robert Weir ed.). Montreal (Qc), Canada. December 28, 1882. p. 7.
- "Çà et là: Mort de Sir Hugh Allan". Le Quotidien (Newspaper) (in French). Montreal. February 7, 1883. p. 2.
- "The Ball at Ravenscrag". Morning Chronicle and Commercial and Shipping Gazette (Newspaper). Vol. 34, no. 13974 (Charles St. Michel ed.). Montreal (Qc), Canada. January 28, 1885. p. 2.
- "Civic Affairs. The Hospital Donation Committee". The Montreal Daily Herald and Daily Commercial Gazette (Newspaper). Vol. 64, no. 96 (The Herald Company ed.). Montreal (Qc), Canada. April 22, 1887. p. 8.
- "The Conservatories : Mr. Montagu Allan's". The Montreal Daily Herald and Daily Commercial Gazette (Newspaper). Vol. 81, no. 38 (The Herald Company ed.). Montreal (Qc), Canada. February 14, 1888. p. 3.
- "Wedding bells". The Montreal Daily Herald and Daily Commercial Gazette (Newspaper). Vol. 81, no. 100 (The Herald Company ed.). Montreal (Qc), Canada. February 26, 1888. p. 5.
- "The Hunt : The Montreal Hunt Club entertained at breakfast at Ravenscraig". The Montreal Daily Herald and Daily Commercial Gazette (Newspaper). Vol. 82, no. 252 (The Herald Company ed.). Montreal (Qc), Canada. October 21, 1889. p. 8.
- "Fashionable Wedding". Quebec Morning Chronicle (Newspaper). Vol. 44, no. 15708 (John J. Foote ed.). Montreal (Qc), Canada. September 11, 1890. p. 1.
- "Linked for life : Marriage of Dr. Charles McEachran and Miss Margaret Allen". The Montreal Daily Herald and Daily Commercial Gazette (Newspaper). Vol. 84, no. 199 (The Herald Company ed.). Montreal (Qc), Canada. August 20, 1891. p. 8.
- "Miss Edith Allan married". Montreal Daily Herald (Newspaper). Vol. 85, no. 222 (James N. Greenshields ed.). Montreal (Qc), Canada. September 22, 1892. p. 8.
- "Biographie de Victor Roy". Le Monde illustré (Newspaper) (in French). Vol. 9, no. 446. Montreal. November 19, 1892. p. 342.
- "Society Notes: The Ball at Ravenscraig". Montreal Daily Herald (Newspaper). Vol. 86, no. 6 (James N. Greenshields ed.). Montreal (Qc), Canada. January 7, 1893. p. 8.
- "Before his prime : Mr. Arthur Allan's Sudden and Awfull Death". Montreal Daily Herald (Newspaper). Vol. 86, no. 14 (James N. Greenshields ed.). Montreal (Qc), Canada. January 17, 1893. p. 8.
- "The Late Mr. Allan's Funeral. Many Citizens Hear Testimony of Respect—No Will". Montreal Daily Herald (Newspaper). Vol. 86, no. 16 (James N. Greenshields ed.). Montreal (Qc), Canada. January 19, 1893. p. 6.
- "Society Notes. Wedding Engagements". Montreal Daily Herald (Newspaper). Vol. 86, no. 16 (James N. Greenshields ed.). Montreal (Qc), Canada. October 19, 1893. p. 6.
- "Montreal Intelligence. Marriage of Montague Allan and Miss Mackenzie. A Brilliant Social Function. A New Monastic Order". The Globe (Newspaper) (The Globe and Mail ed.). October 19, 1893. p. 2.
- "A Allan wedded : H. Montagu Allan united to beautiful Miss Mackenzie". The Portland Daily Press (Newspaper). Vol. 32, no. 78 (N.A. Foster & Co. ed.). October 20, 1893. p. 2.
- "Social and Personal : Wedding of Mr. H. Montagu Allan to Miss Margerite Mackenzie". Montreal Daily Herald (Newspaper). Vol. 86, no. 252 (James N. Greenshields ed.). Montreal (Qc), Canada. October 21, 1893. p. 3.
- "Millionaire volé". La Presse (Newspaper) (in French). Vol. 10, no. 17. Montreal (Qc), Canada. July 19, 1894. p. 6.
- "Births. Allan". Montreal Daily Herald (Newspaper). Vol. 87, no. 187 (James N. Greenshields ed.). Montreal (Qc), Canada. August 6, 1894. p. 3.
- "At Ravenscrag : Guest dance the old year out and the new year in". Montreal Daily Herald (Newspaper). Vol. 88, no. 2 (James N. Greenshields ed.). Montreal (Qc), Canada. January 2, 1895. p. 8.
- "The Social World. Mrs. Montagu Allan gave a dinner at "Ravinscrag" on Tuesday". Montreal Daily Herald (Newspaper). Vol. 88, no. 33 (James N. Greenshields ed.). Montreal (Qc), Canada. February 7, 1895. p. 8.
- "Our Reservoirs : The Masonry Needs Repairing and it Will Cost Much Money". Montreal Daily Herald (Newspaper). Vol. 89, no. 16 (James N. Greenshields ed.). Montreal (Qc), Canada. January 18, 1896. p. 6.
- "Births. Allan". The Daily Witness (Newspaper). Vol. 37, no. 252 (John Dougall ed.). Montreal (Qc), Canada. October 27, 1896. p. 2.
- "Society... Large Party on the Ravenscrag tally-ho". The Herald (Newspaper). Vol. 90, no. 249 (The Herald Publishing Company ed.). Montreal (Qc), Canada. October 17, 1897. p. 5.
- "Interior Decorations (Ad from W. P. Scott)". The Herald (Newspaper). Vol. 91, no. 211 (The Herald Publishing Company ed.). Montreal. September 21, 1898. p. 8.
- "Extending his business : W. P. Scott". The Herald (Newspaper). Vol. 91, no. 226 (The Herald Publishing Company ed.). Montreal. September 26, 1898. p. 8.
- "Personnal Intelligence : Andrew T. Taylor to Cacouna". The Gazette (Newspaper). Vol. 128, no. 199 (Postmedia Network Inc. ed.). Montreal. August 21, 1899. p. 3.
- "Social and Personal : Mrs. Montagu Allan's Tea on Friday". The Herald (Newspaper). Vol. 92, no. 302 (The Herald Publishing Company ed.). Montreal. December 26, 1899. p. 8.
- "Other 3 (No Title): Social Events". The Globe (Newspaper) (The Globe and Mail ed.). December 19, 1900. p. 8.
- "Department for Women Readers : A Brilliant Ball". The Herald (Newspaper). Vol. 94, no. 1 (The Herald Publishing Company ed.). Montreal. January 2, 1901. p. 6.
- "Other 5 (No Title): Social Events". The Globe (Newspaper) (The Globe and Mail ed.). January 4, 1901. p. 5.
- "Babies' Bazaar at Ravenscrag". The Herald (Newspaper). Vol. 94, no. 78 (The Herald Publishing Company ed.). Montreal. April 1, 1901. p. 3.
- "Other 8 (No Title): Social Events". The Globe (Newspaper) (The Globe and Mail ed.). April 2, 1901. p. 8.
- "Other 5 (No Title): Social Events". The Globe (Newspaper) (The Globe and Mail ed.). May 13, 1901. p. 4.
- "The Royal Visit : Work for the Illumination of Private Buildings Already Under Way". The Daily Witness (Newspaper) (John Dougall ed.). August 2, 1901. p. 2.
- "Other 9 (No Title): Social Events". The Globe (Newspaper) (The Globe and Mail ed.). May 17, 1902. p. 24.
- "For the Sick Babies: Sale and Party on the Grounds of Ravenscrag". The Daily Witness (Newspaper). Vol. 43, no. 119 (John Dougall ed.). May 21, 1902. p. 3.
- "The Canada of Ours. The Building Trade. Whighton & Morison". The Daily Witness (Illustrated Section) (Newspaper). Vol. 43, no. 287 (John Dougall ed.). Montreal. December 6, 1902. pp. 14–15.
- "Hugh Montague Allan". The Globe (Newspaper) (The Globe and Mail ed.). August 28, 1903. p. 1.
- "Social and Personal : Lord and Lady Minto at Ravenscrag". The Daily Witness (Newspaper). Vol. 44, no. 285 (John Dougall ed.). December 5, 1903. p. 6.
- "Social and Personal : Card Party at Ravenscrag". The Daily Witness (Newspaper). Vol. 45, no. 64 (John Dougall ed.). March 16, 1904. p. 6.
- "Vice-Regal Visit". The Globe (Newspaper) (The Globe and Mail ed.). May 14, 1904. p. 17.
- "Society Matrons of Montreal were there with Governor-General". The Montreal Herald (Newspaper). Vol. 96, no. 115 (The Herald Company ed.). Montreal. May 16, 1904. p. 5.
- "W. P. Scott, Decorator (Ad)". The Herald (Book 2) (Newspaper). Vol. 97, no. 202 (The Herald Company ed.). Montreal. August 26, 1905. p. 30.
- "Loyale bienvenue au neveu du Roi". La Presse (Newspaper) (in French). Montreal (Qc), Canada. May 8, 1906. p. 1.
- "Bell's Galleries (Ad) : Decorators, Cabinet Makers, Designers, Upholsterors". The Standard (Illustrated Edition) (Newspaper). Vol. 2, no. 22 (The Standard ed.). Montreal (Qc), Canada. June 2, 1906. p. 4.
- "Permis de construire à Montréal : Ave des Pins". Le Prix courant (Newspaper) (in French). Vol. 40, no. 19. Montreal (Qc), Canada. May 10, 1907. p. 40.
- E. R. Parkhurst (September 24, 1908). "Music and Drama". The Globe (Newspaper) (The Globe and Mail ed.). p. 12.
- E. R. Parkhurst (January 10, 1913). "The Royal Patient Maintains Strength. The Condition of Her Royal Highness is Unchanged. Illness Causes Anxiety: The Bulletins Issued Revcal Nothing Definite. Pain Relieved by Opaites. No Operation Yet Decided Upon". The Globe (Newspaper) (The Globe and Mail ed.). p. 1.
- "Other 2 (No Title) : Social Events". The Globe (Newspaper) (The Globe and Mail ed.). January 15, 1913. p. 2.
- "Montreal's Beautiful Homes : "Ravenscrag," The Home of Sir Montagu Allan". The Saturday Mirror (Newspaper). Vol. 1, no. 6 (Montréal Publishing Company Limited ed.). Montreal. March 8, 1913. p. 6.
- "Social Events: At Home To-Day". The Globe (Newspaper) (The Globe and Mail ed.). January 17, 1914. p. 10.
- "Conservatory and Greenhouse at Sir Montagu Allan's, at Montreal". Construction (Newspaper) (in French). Vol. 7, no. 3 (H. Gagnier ed.). Montreal. March 3, 1914. p. 6.
- "Other 11 (No Title) : Social Events". The Globe (Newspaper) (The Globe and Mail ed.). January 9, 1915. p. 8.
- "Other 7 (No Title) : Social Events". The Globe (Newspaper) (The Globe and Mail ed.). October 4, 1919. p. 10.
- "Other 8 (No Title) : Social Events". The Globe (Newspaper) (The Globe and Mail ed.). January 9, 1920. p. 10.
- "Other 8 (No Title) : Social Events". The Globe (Newspaper) (The Globe and Mail ed.). June 11, 1921. p. 17.
- "Other 7 (No Title) : Social Events". The Globe (Newspaper) (The Globe and Mail ed.). June 13, 1921. p. 8.
- "Other 12 (No Title) : Social Events". The Globe (Newspaper) (The Globe and Mail ed.). May 6, 1926. p. 8.
- "On cancelle la fête à cause de la pluie". Le Droit (Newspaper) (in French). Vol. 14, no. 137. Montreal (Qc), Canada. June 16, 1926. p. 1.
- "White Gowns in Varied Fabrics Worn At Montreal Deb Ball". The Globe (Newspaper) (The Globe and Mail ed.). October 30, 1930. p. 4, 21.
- "Ravenscrag Becomes Viceregal Home". The Globe (Newspaper) (The Globe and Mail ed.). July 2, 1931. p. 14.
- "Bessboroughs at Montreal For the Next Few Months". The Globe (Newspaper) (The Globe and Mail ed.). July 4, 1931. p. 2.
- "Blue-Eyed Baby Son Is Born To First Lady of Dominion. Third in Vice-Regal History". The Globe (Newspaper) (The Globe and Mail ed.). August 17, 1931. p. 14.
- "Both Doing Well". The Globe (Newspaper) (The Globe and Mail ed.). August 17, 1931. p. 2.
- "Viceregal Baby Will Be Named For Mother, King and Great River". The Globe (Newspaper) (The Globe and Mail ed.). September 1, 1931. p. 16.
- "Avis important : Pour le compte de Sir H. Montagu Allan, Fraser Brothers Limited ont le plaisir d'annoncer une grande vente à l'encan d'une partie des superbes effets de ménage, antiques et modernes, du manoir "Ravenscrag", situé à 1025 Ave des Pins Ouest". La Presse (Newspaper) (in French). Vol. 57, no. 28. Montreal. November 16, 1940. p. 49.
- Ludington, Tracy S. (November 19, 1940). "Ravenscrag's Halls Come to Life As Rich Furnishings Go on Block". The Gazette (Newspaper). Vol. 169, no. 278. Montreal.
- "Ravenscrag given to Royal Victoria". The Montreal Gazette (Newspaper). Vol. 12, no. 126. Montreal. November 11, 1940.
- "Ravenscrag… the Historic Residence of Sir Montagu and Lady Allan presented to the Royal Victoria Hospital". The Montreal Daily Star (Newspaper). Vol. 72, no. 273. Montreal. November 14, 1940.
- "Auction draws crowds to Ravenscrag". The Gazette (Newspaper). Vol. 169, no. 279. Montreal. November 19, 1940.
- Edgar Andrew Collard (January 2, 1941). "Recent Ravenscrag Sale Recalls…". The Montreal Gazette (Newspaper). Montreal.
- "McTavish's House". The Montreal Gazette (Newspaper). Montreal. January 17, 1941.
- "Disparition du manoir Lyman". La Patrie (Newspaper) (in French). Vol. 63, no. 33. Montreal. April 4, 1941.
- "Enquête sur un feu : Maison Fraser Bothers". L'Action catholique : organe de l'Action sociale catholique (Newspaper) (in French). Vol. 35, no. 10791. Montreal (Qc), Canada. January 15, 1942. p. 2.
- "Mlle Martha Allan décédée à 47 ans : une grande perte pour le théâtre canadien". Le Devoir (Newspaper) (in French). Vol. 33, no. 78. Montreal (Qc), Canada. April 6, 1942.
- "Un institut de psychiatrie établi au "Ravenscrag"". Montréal-Matin (Newspaper) (in French). Vol. 14, no. 4. Montreal. July 8, 1943. p. 16.
- "L'École du meuble hérite de trois collections". Le Devoir (Newspaper) (in French). Vol. 34, no. 248. Montreal. October 28, 1943. p. 3.
- "Le "Ravenscrag" est aujourd'hui l'Institut Allan". La Patrie (Newspaper) (in French). Vol. 66, no. 117. Montreal. July 13, 1944. p. 22.
- "Tit Bits of the turf by Finch Mason". The Westmount examiner (Newspaper). Vol. 15, no. 46. Montreal. November 17, 1944. p. 19.
- "Sir Hugh Montagu Allan (Décès)". La Presse (Newspaper) (in French). Vol. 67, no. 290. Montreal. September 27, 1951. p. 4.
- "The Knigh of Ravenscrag". The Montreal Gazette (Newspaper). Vol. 15, no. 46. Montreal. September 29, 1951.
- "Feu Lady Allan, une grande chatelaine". La Patrie (Newspaper) (in French). Vol. 79, no. 192. Montreal. October 15, 1957. p. 10.
- "He called it Ravenscrag". The Montreal Gazette (Newspaper). Montreal. June 4, 1983.
- "Appel d'offres : agrandissements et rénovations (Allan Memorial Institute)". La Presse (Newspaper) (in French). Vol. 100, no. 255. Montreal QC, Canada. September 27, 1984. p. E7 (Book E).
- Pinard, Guy (October 18, 1987). "Le Ravenscrag". La Presse (Newspaper) (in French). Vol. 103, no. 353. Montreal. p. A8 (Cahier A).
- Alan Hustak (November 18, 1990). "Tycoon's mansion adopted new vocation : magnificent private home Ravenscrag became Allan Institute". The Montreal Gazette (Newspaper). Montreal. p. D4.
- "L'Institut Allan Memorial inaugurera les portes historiques du manoir Ravenscrag, nouvellement restaurées". Le Devoir (Newspaper) (in French). Vol. 82, no. 34. Montreal QC, Canada. February 11, 1991. p. 10.
- Manseau, Sylvie (May–June 1992). La compagnie d'éditions Southam Ltée (ed.). "Pavillon de garde Ravenscrag". Architecture-concept (Newspaper) (in French). Vol. 100, no. 255. Montreal QC, Canada. p. 14.
- Peter Maser (July 18, 1992). "The other side of Montreal". The Montreal Gazette (Newspaper). Montreal.
- Collard, Edgar Andrew (January 9, 1993). "Retirement is not for everyone; Prominent Canadians worked long and thrived on it". The Montreal Gazette (Newspaper). Montreal QC, Canada.
- Pinard, Guy (July 8, 1993). "L'opulence nostalgique du «Mille carré doré»". La Presse (Newspaper) (in French). Montreal QC, Canada.
- Collard, Edgar Andrew (September 4, 1993). "Saving the summer for winter; Conservatories allowed southern atmosphere in snow". The Montreal Gazette (Newspaper). Montreal QC, Canada.
- Schnurmacher, Thomas (September 29, 1993). "Celebs to hoof it Sunday in Farha Foundation AIDS walkathon". The Montreal Gazette (Newspaper). Montreal QC, Canada.
- Agency, Reuter (November 18, 1994). "Étables restaurées à Montréal". La Presse (Newspaper) (in French). Montreal QC, Canada. p. C14.
- McArthur, Douglas (March 29, 1997). "Taking the high road in Montreal : A walking tour of one of Canada's pre-eminent neighbourhoods reveals that the gilt has faded on many of the homes once occupied by the country's power brokers. However, the sense, if not the smell, of old money permeates what was once an enclave of the wealthy". The Montreal Gazette (Newspaper). Montreal QC, Canada.
- "L'express du matin : Centre de santé McGill". La Presse (Newspaper) (in French). Vol. 113, no. 267. Montreal QC, Canada. July 22, 1997. p. A3.
- Collard, Edgar Andrew (May 30, 1998). "One-up manship financed a church organ". The Montreal Gazette (Newspaper). Montreal QC, Canada.
- Paré, Isabelle (September 28, 1998). "Le super hôpital McGill, c'est pour 2003-2004". Le Devoir (Newspaper) (in French). Vol. 89, no. 219. Montreal QC, Canada. p. A1;A8.
- Roy, Paul (November 5, 1998). "Le super-hôpital McGill construit dans la cour Glen". Le Devoir (Newspaper) (in French). Montreal QC, Canada. p. A7.
- Chartier, Jean (April 2, 1999). "L'université McGill est en pleine expansion". Le Devoir (Newspaper) (in French). Montreal QC, Canada. p. A3.
- Chartier, Jean (May 23, 2000). "L'avenir du campus du Royal Victoria inquiète les amoureux du mont Royal". Le Devoir (Newspaper) (in French). Montreal QC, Canada. p. A2.
- Bégin, Jean-François (November 8, 2000). "Consultations publiques sur l'avenir des hôpitaux de McGill". Le Devoir (Newspaper) (in French). Montreal QC, Canada. p. E3.
- Chartier, Jean (May 25, 2000). "Des propriétés de l'université dépérissent : McGill manque de fric pour retaper les villas de millionnaires". Le Devoir (Newspaper) (in French). Montreal QC, Canada. p. A4.
- Gordon, Beck (October 22, 2001). "Eye on Montreal". The Montreal Gazette (Newspaper). Montreal QC, Canada.
- Champagne, Sarah (June 9, 2006). "Le Royal Vic aménage en catimini un stationnement dans une zone protégée". La Presse (Newspaper) (in French). Montreal QC, Canada. p. A1.
- Champagne, Sarah (June 23, 2006). "Stationnement démantelé au Royal Vic". La Presse (Newspaper) (in French). Montreal QC, Canada. p. A8.
- Roquigny, Peggy (2011). "Loisirs dansants de la bourgeoisie anglo-montréalaise. Transformation et persistance des lieux de pratique, 1870–1940" (PDF). Urban History Review / Revue d'histoire urbaine (Newspaper) (in French). Vol. 40, no. 1. Montreal QC, Canada. p. 17-29.
- Cameron, Daphné (June 6, 2013). "L'Université McGill veut acheter l'hôpital Royal Victoria". La Presse (Newspaper) (in French). Montreal (QC), Canada.
- Hustak, Alan (January 30, 2014). "Centenarian Lucille Pacaud knew key to a long and active life". The Globe and Mail (Newspaper). Toronto (ONT), Canada.
- Lowrie, Morgon (April 26, 2015). "L'express du matin : Centre de santé McGill". La Presse (Newspaper) (in French). Montreal. p. A3.
- Dufranne, Quentin (September 21, 2021). "Une consultation publique pour l'avenir de l'ancien hôpital Royal Victoria". Journal Métro (Website) (Newspaper) (in French). Montreal, Quebec.
- Prost, Mathieu (June 12, 2021). "L'ancien hôpital Royal Victoria, nouvelle porte d'accès au mont Royal". ICI Radio-Canada - Grand Montréal (site web) (Newspaper) (in French). Montreal (Qc), Canada.
- Tiranti, Rosanna (November 16, 2021). "McGill ouverte à rechercher des corps autochtones au Royal-Vic". Journal Métro (Newspaper) (in French). Montreal. p. 1,3.
- Cucchi, Maud (March 30, 2022). "L'hôpital Royal Victoria est « un site de crimes », allèguent des mères mohawks". ICI Radio-Canada - Grand Montréal (site web) (Newspaper) (in French). Montreal (Qc), Canada.
- Dufranne, Quentin (March 31, 2022). "Royal Victoria: des mères mohawks lancent une action en Cour supérieure". Journal Métro (site web) (Newspaper) (in French). Montreal (Qc), Canada.
- Ducas, Isabelle (May 25, 2022). "Feu vert au réaménagement de l'ancien hôpital Royal Victoria". La Presse + (Newspaper) (in French). Montreal. p. A18.
- Du Ruisseau, Olivier (July 27, 2022). "Sépultures anonymes : la SQI n'exclut pas des fouilles sur le site du Royal Victoria". Le Devoir (Site Web) (Newspaper) (in French). Montreal (Qc), Canada.
- Du Ruisseau, Olivier (July 28, 2022). "III Sépultures anonymes : Des fouilles sur le site du Royal Victoria pourraient avoir lieu". Le Devoir (Site Web) (Newspaper) (in French). Montreal (Qc), Canada. p. A4.
- Jung, Delphine (October 24, 2022). "Le réaménagement de l'ancien Royal Victoria engendre des tensions". ICI Radio-Canada - Grand Montréal (Newspaper) (in French). Montreal.
- La Presse Canadienne (October 29, 2022). "L'injonction est accordée aux Mères mohawks pour stopper les travaux à McGill". ICI Radio-Canada - Grand Montréal (site web) (Newspaper) (in French). Montreal (Qc), Canada.
- La Presse Canadienne (November 1, 2022). "Les travaux de McGill interrompus pour éviter un « préjudice irréparable » aux Mohawks". Le Devoir (site web) (Newspaper) (in French). Montreal (Qc), Canada.
- Corriveau, Jeanne (December 13, 2022). "Le parc du Mont-Royal sera agrandi : Des terrains à l'arrière de l'ancien hôpital Royal Victoria seront cédés à la Ville et quelque 40% des places de stationnement seront verdies". Le Devoir (Newspaper) (in French). Montreal (Qc), Canada. p. A2, A3.
- Jung, Delphine (April 20, 2023). "Des fouilles auront lieu à l'ancien hôpital Royal Victoria, à la demande des Mohawks". ICI Radio-Canada - Grand Montréal (site web) (Newspaper) (in French). Montreal (Qc), Canada.
- "Sépultures d'enfants autochtones: les fouilles commencent au Royal Victoria". Journal Métro (Site Web) (Newspaper) (in French). Montreal (Qc), Canada. April 20, 2023.
- Fortier, Marco (April 20, 2023). "À la recherche de sépultures anonymes d'enfants autochtones à l'hôpital Royal Victoria". Le Devoir (site web) (Newspaper) (in French). Montreal (Qc), Canada.
- La Presse Canadienne (September 15, 2023). "Les « Mères mohawks » demandent d'interrompre le chantier de Royal Vic". La Presse + (Newspaper) (in French). Montreal (Qc), Canada. p. A16.
- La Presse Canadienne (October 4, 2023). "Expériences psychiatriques à McGill : Les États-Unis disposent d'une immunité juridique, tranche la Cour d'appel". La Presse + (Newspaper) (in French). Montreal (Qc), Canada. p. A19.
- La Presse Canadienne (November 21, 2023). "Fouilles au Royal Victoria : autre petite victoire des Mères mohawks". Radio-Canada - Espaces Autochtones (Newspaper) (in French). Montreal (Qc), Canada.
- Riga, Andy (April 25, 2024). "New Vic isn't just for McGill community". Montreal Gazette (Newspaper). Montreal (Qc), Canada. p. A.1.
- La Presse Canadienne (May 31, 2024). "Pas de réexamen de la Cour suprême pour une décision sur le projet MK-ULTRA". Le Devoir (Newspaper) (in French). Montreal (Qc), Canada. p. A2.
- La Presse Canadienne (August 17, 2024). "Fouilles au Royal Victoria : les Mères mohawks déboutées en Cour d'appel". ICI Radio-Canada - Grand Montréal (site web) (Newspaper) (in French). Montreal (Qc), Canada.
- "La lutte des "Mères Mohawks" pour retrouver des enfants autochtones disparus à Montréal". Agence France Presse Infos Françaises (site web) (Newspaper) (in French). Montreal (Qc), Canada. September 4, 2024.

=== Websites ===
- The Canadian Encyclopedia (2015). "Peach : Production". thecanadianencyclopedia.ca. The Canadian Encyclopedia.
- Rod MacLeod (2012). "Hugh Allan's Bookcase/Mantlepiece - 1861". 100objects.qahn.org. Identity of English-speaking Quebec in 100 Objects.
- "Allan Memorial Institute (formely Ravenscrag)". cac.mcgill.ca. Montreal (Qc), Canada: Canadian Architecture Collection McGill University. 2012.
- Élodie Poletto (2005). "Pavillon Allan Memorial de l'Hôpital Royal Victoria". patrimoine-culturel.gouv.qc.ca/rpcq/. Montreal (Qc), Canada: Quebec Ministry of Culture and Communications.
- MUMAQ - Musée des métiers d'art du Québec. "Collection Jean-Marie Gauvreau : l'épopée d'une collection". mumaq.com (in French). Montreal (Qc), Canada: MUMAQ - Musée des métiers d'art du Québec.
- "Projet Royal Victoria". projetroyalvictoria.com (in French). Montreal (Qc), Canada: Société des infrastructures du Québec (SQI). 2024.
- "Institut Allan Memorial (Hôpital Royal Victoria)". ville.montreal.qc.ca/siteofficieldumontroyal/ (in French). Montreal (Qc), Canada: Ville de Montréal.
- "Grand répertoire du patrimoine bâti de Montréal : 1025, Avenue des Pins Ouest". patrimoine.ville.montreal.qc.ca/inventaire/ (in French). Montreal (Qc), Canada: Ville de Montréal.

=== Other sources ===
- Photographic inventory of objects in the Jean-Marie Gauvreau collection [stored at 1874 Notre-Dame Street East], MacDonald-Stewart Foundation Archives, undated [1980s].
- Wiviott, Matthew (October 1, 2009). Ravenscrag Reconsidered: a look at the past and a prospect for the future of the AMI (oral presentation). Montreal, Quebec: Allan Memorial Institute. p. 2. Wiviott.

== See also ==
- Golden Square Mile
- List of castles in Canada
- Scots-Quebecers
- Victoria Mansion
