= Merchants Bank of Canada =

Canadian bank (1861–1923)

- Industry: Banking
- Founded: 18 May 1861
- Defunct: 1923
- Fate: Acquired by the Bank of Montreal
- Headquarters: 355 rue Saint-Jacques, Montreal, Quebec

The Merchants' Bank of Canada, formerly known as Merchants' Bank, was a Canadian chartered bank incorporated in 1861 and merged into the Bank of Montreal in 1923.

== History ==
=== Inception ===
A group of Montreal capitalists seeking to establish a bank in Montreal supported the idea by a petition with signatories including Sir Hugh Allan, Louis Renaud, Harrison Stephens, the Hon. John Young, Hannibal Hodges Whitney, Damase Masson, Edwin Atwater, William Edmonstone, Andrew Allan, John Smith, Ira Gould, and Robert Anderson.

Initially known as The Merchants' Bank, it was officially incorporated on 18 May 1861. Montreal, Quebec became the birthplace of the first Merchants' Bank, which opened for business on 9 May 1864 with a capital of $100,000. Sir Hugh Allan, head of the Montreal Ocean Steamship Company, served as the founding president of the company. After a parliamentary session in 1865, the act that incorporated the Merchants' Bank in Montreal was amended to extend the timeframe for fulfilling the capital payment obligations outlined in the original act.

By January 1866, Merchants' Bank was $100 a share and had a four percent dividend.

=== Merchants Bank of Canada ===
In its early years, the bank's operations were confined to Montreal, serving as a local financial institution. In 1867, the bank began its first expansion outside Quebec by taking over 17 branches of the Commercial Bank of Canada, based in Kingston, establishing a presence in Ontario. The company was renamed the Merchants' Bank of Canada in 1868 after Luther Holton, who held prominent roles with the Montreal City and District Savings Bank and the Commercial Bank, successfully negotiated the acquisition of the latter by Merchants' Bank. The Merchants' Bank Act, passed on 22 May 1868, approved the merger of the Commercial Bank of Canada with the Merchants' Bank and updated their founding statutes. Shareholders were compensated with one Merchants' Bank share for every three shares they held in the Commercial Bank.

==== 1870s ====
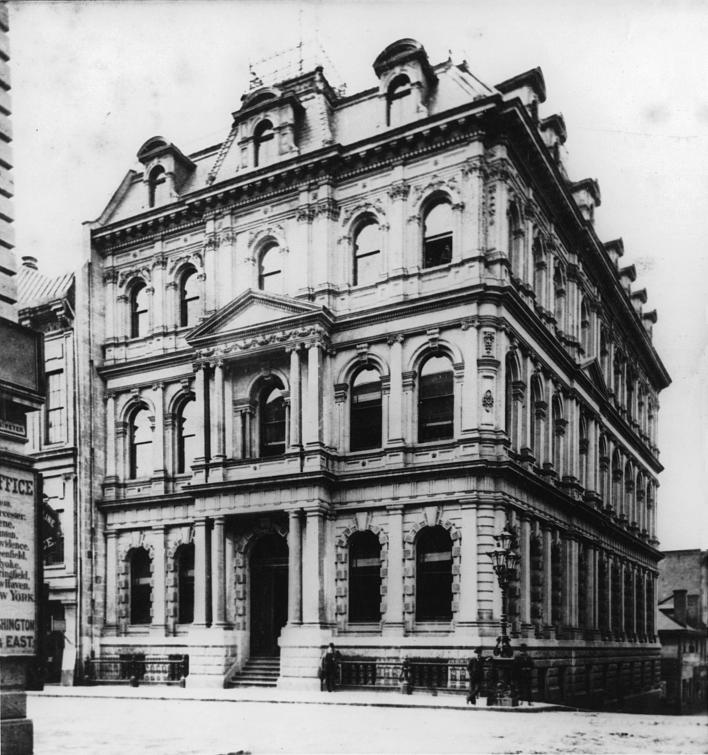
The head office of the bank on St James Street in Montreal. It was built in 1870 and was designed by Hopkins & Wily.

By 1871, there were two Quebec branches beyond Montreal headquarters, alongside 22 branches throughout Ontario.

Sir Hugh Allan served as president of the company’s board of directors, which featured Hon. John Hamilton as vice-president alongside directors D. Masson, Andrew Allan, Adolphe Roy, W.F. Kay, and Hector Mackenzie. The head office of the Merchants' Bank of Canada, a 117 ft. building, was completed in April 1873 on St. James Street and St. Peter Street in Montreal's Place d'Armes. It was designed by the architectural firm, Hopkins & Wily, operated by John W. Hopkins and Daniel Wily. In 1875, there were branches in Almonte, Beauharnois, Belleville, Berlin, Brampton, Chatham, Elora, Fergus, Galt, Gananoque, Granby, Hamilton, Ingersoll, Kincardine, Kingston, Levis, Lindsay, London, Mitchell, Montreal, Napanee, Orangeville, Ottawa, Owen Sound, Pembroke, Perth, Prescott, Renfrew, Sorel, St. Hyacinthe, St. John's (Quebec), St. Thomas, Stratford, Tilsonburg, Toronto, Walkerton, Waterloo (Ontario), Windsor, and Winnipeg. Jackson Rae was the general manager of the Merchants' Bank of Canada in Montreal. In Winnipeg, it was Duncan MacArthur. Internationally, the London-based Merchants' Bank of Canada was on 32 Lombard Street and the New York branch was on 62 Wall Street.

The Panic of 1873 and the ensuing Long Depression of the 1870s brought the bank close to failure. The bank was stabilized around 1876, attributed to the effective oversight of George Hague, formerly with The Bank of Toronto and a future vice-president of the Canadian Bankers Association. By 1877, the Merchants' Bank had risen to become the second largest bank in Canada.

==== 1880s ====
Now with a total of 30 branches in 1880, its network covered Quebec, Ontario, and included one branch in Manitoba. The acting general manager, George Hague, was supported by W.J. Ingram in the role of assistant general manager. The bank was distributing a 6.5 percent dividend and reported a circulation of $1,744,123.00 in notes.

Hon. John Abbott, appointed in 1883 to replace the late Sir Hugh Allan as a director of the Merchants' Bank of Canada, brought his legal expertise as a solicitor for the Canadian Pacific Railway to the board.

==== 1900s ====
At the beginning of 1900, Andrew Allan, brother of Sir Hugh Allan, was the president of the Merchants' Bank of Canada with H. Mackenzie as vice-president and George Hague alongside Thomas Fyshe as general manager. The bank had 50 branches in total, with a 7 percent dividend rate, $2,777,274.00 notes in circulation, and $27,267,992.00 in assets as of 31 May 1899.

=== Acquisition ===
In 1919, the Merchants' Bank of Canada had expanded significantly, reaching 329 branches across the country, from coast to coast. One of Canada's Big Five banks, The Bank of Montreal set out to acquire the Merchants' Bank of Canada in 1921, which had over 400 branches from the Maritimes to Vancouver Island. The bank had engaged in some large, risky loans, but still held assets of $190 million and nearly $20 million in capital and surplus, with a solid history of paying dividends. The discovery of improper credit practices with larger clients at the 1922 shareholders' meeting cast a shadow over the finalization of the sale of the Merchants' Bank of Canada to the Bank of Montreal. Following an internal investigation, the deal went ahead, culminating in the merger in 1923. With the acquisition complete, Canada saw its banking sector consolidated into just 17 major institutions overseeing the nation's economic matters.

== Gallery of Branches ==
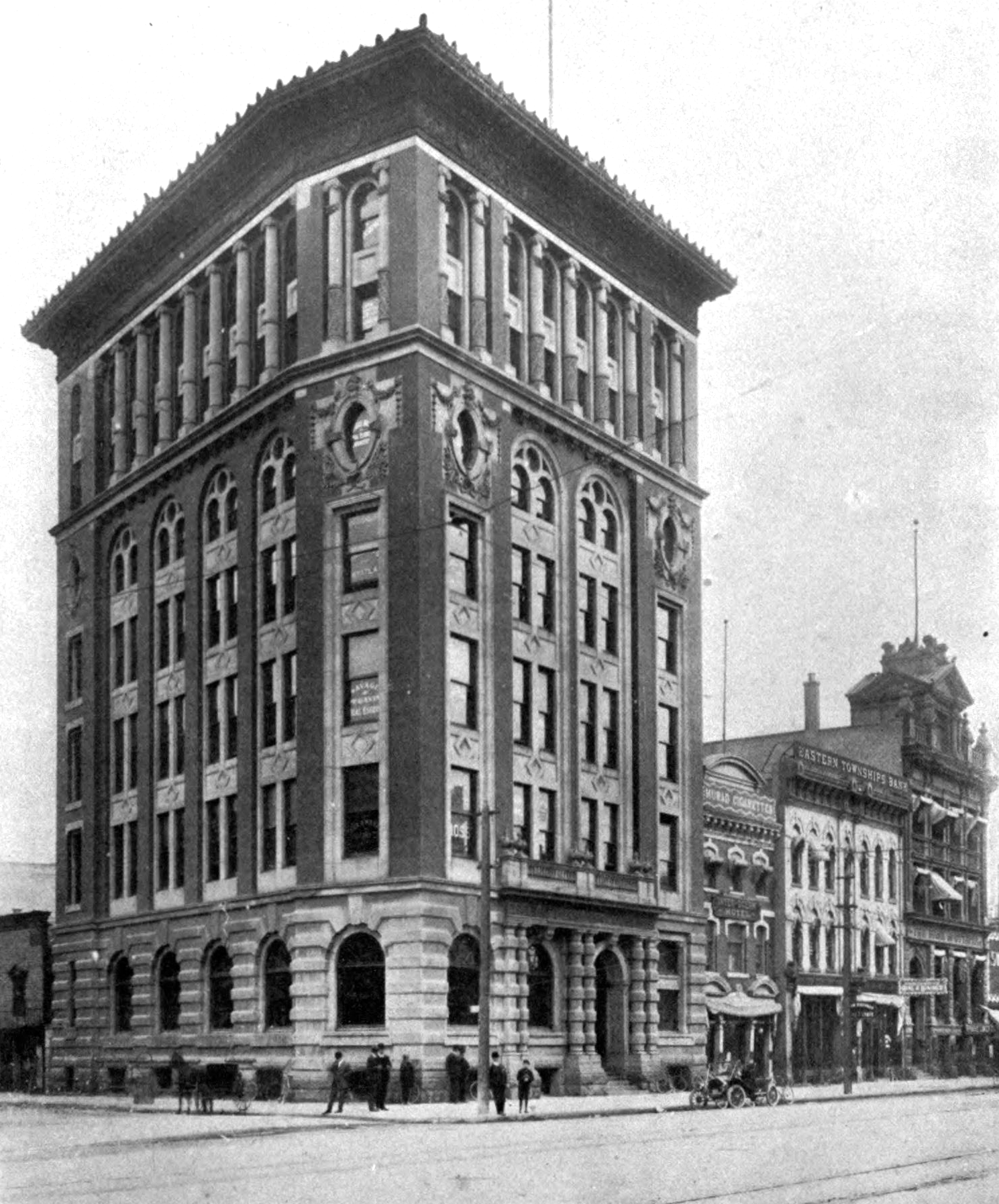
Winnipeg

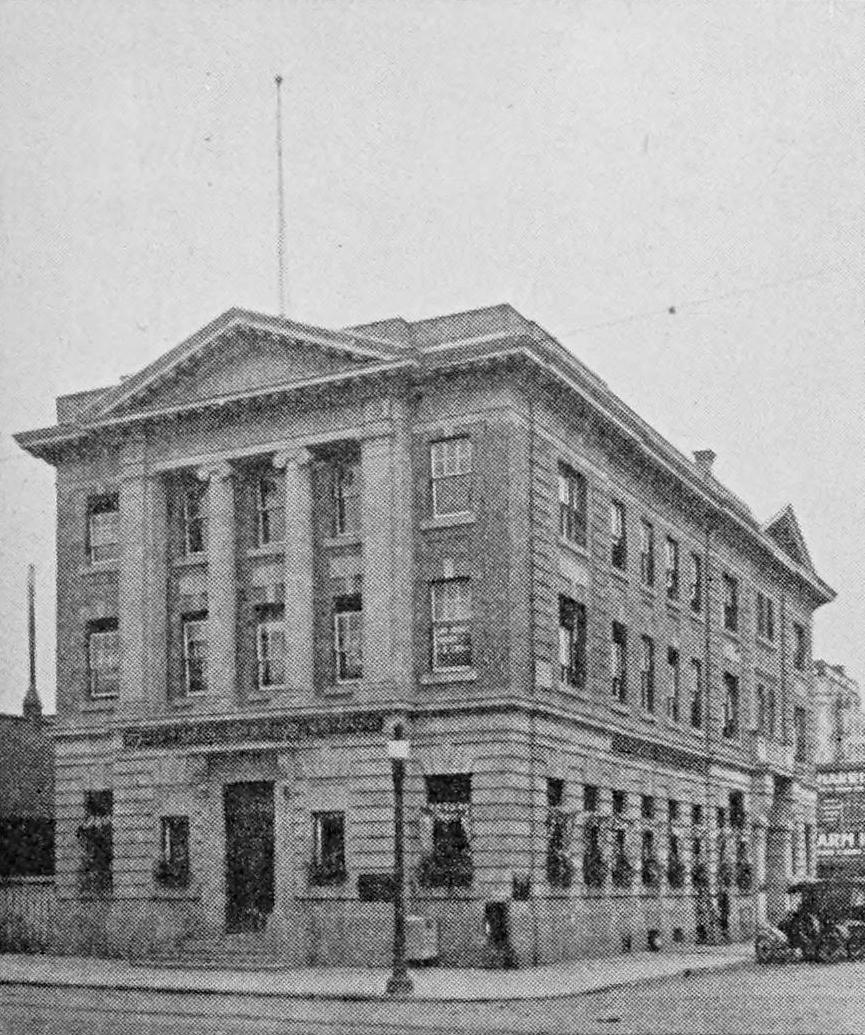
Edmonton

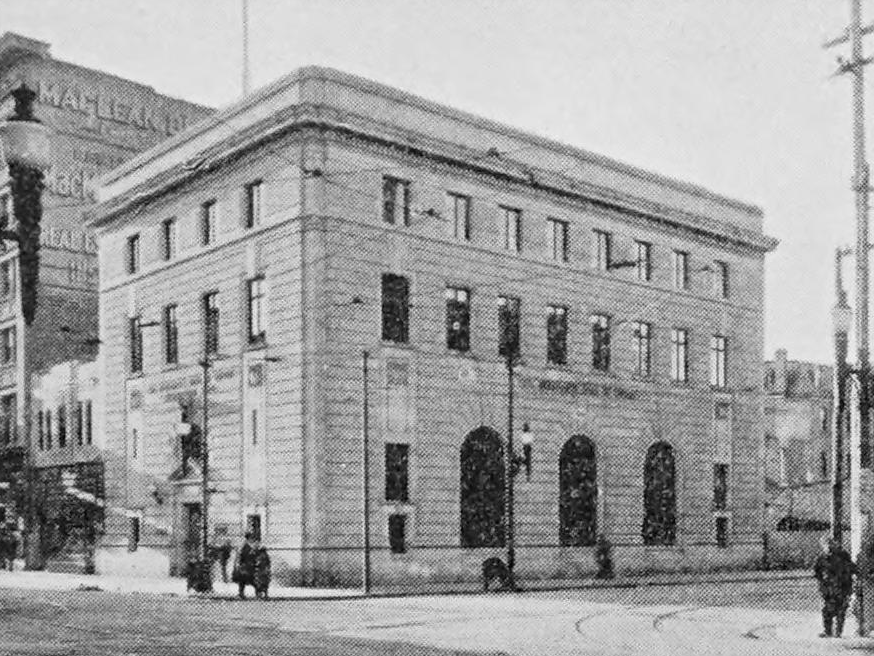
Calgary

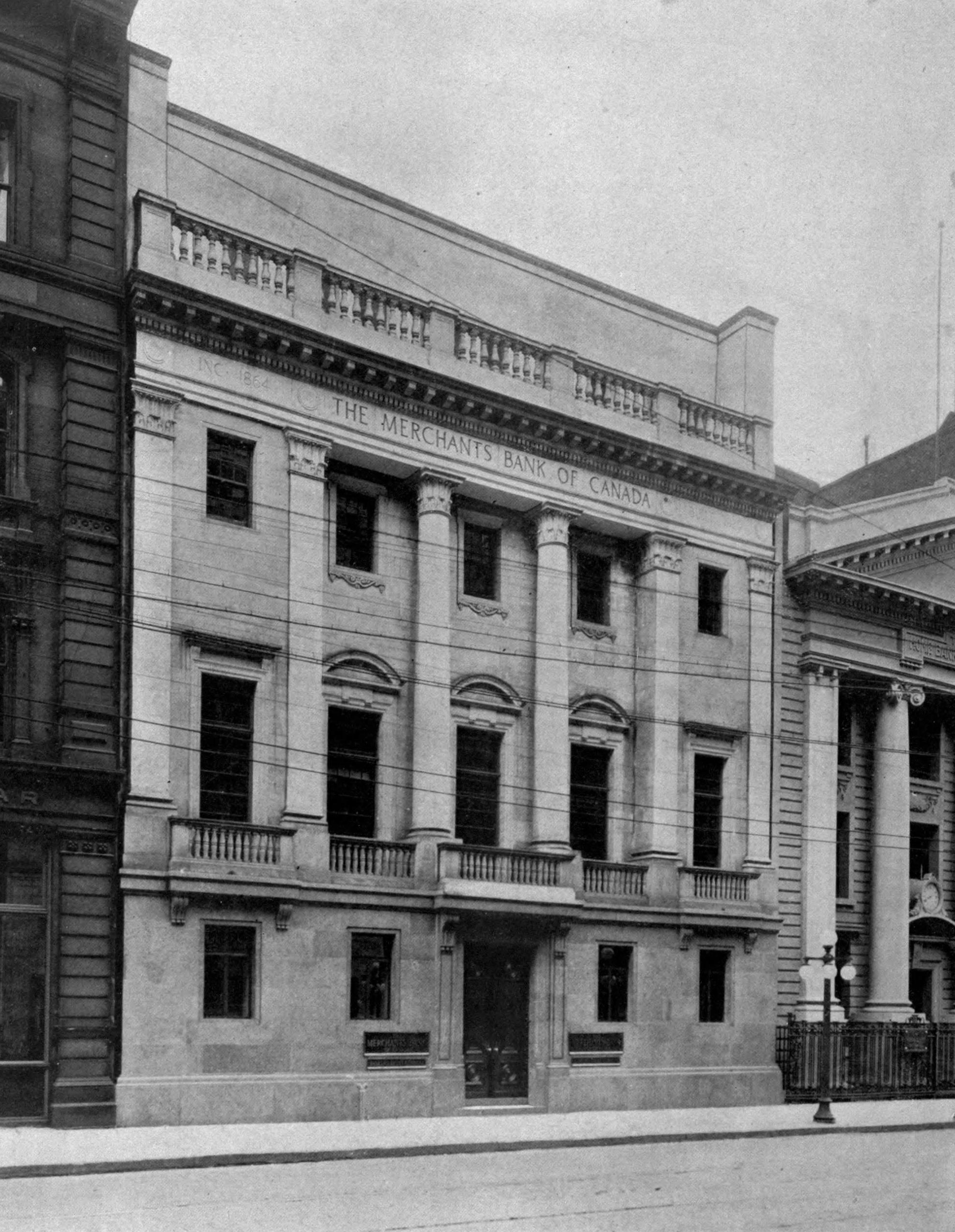
Toronto

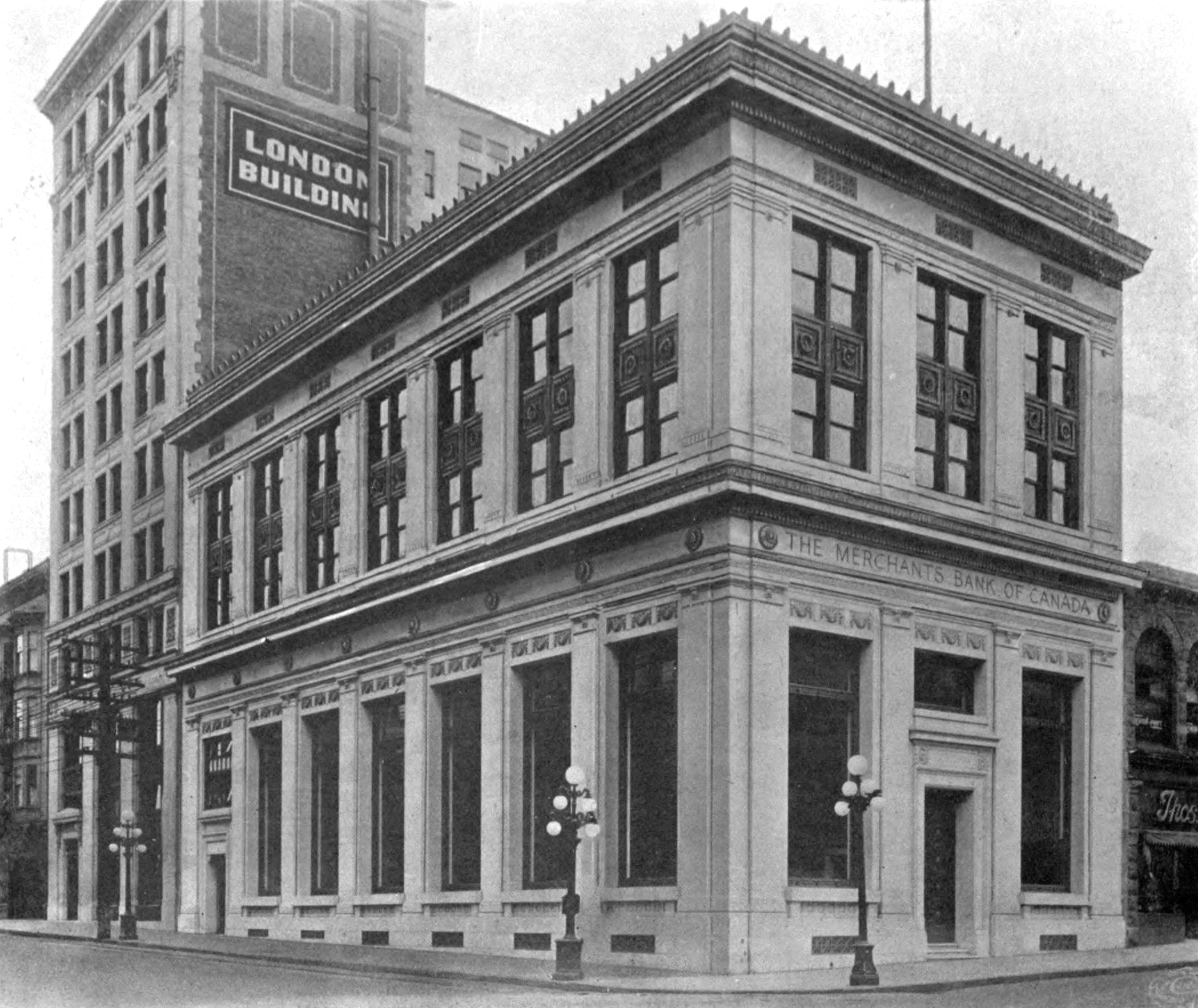
Vancouver

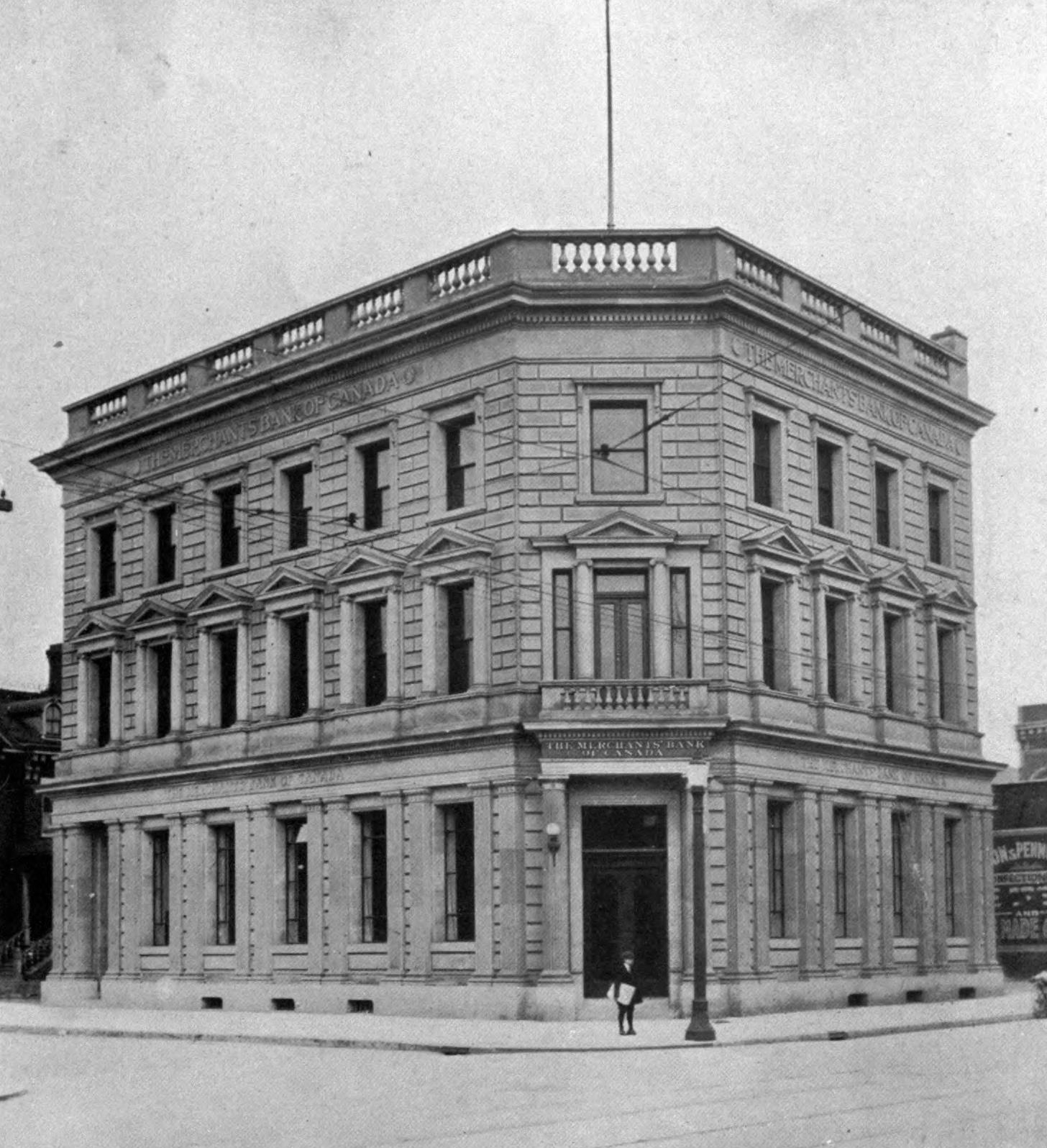
Windsor

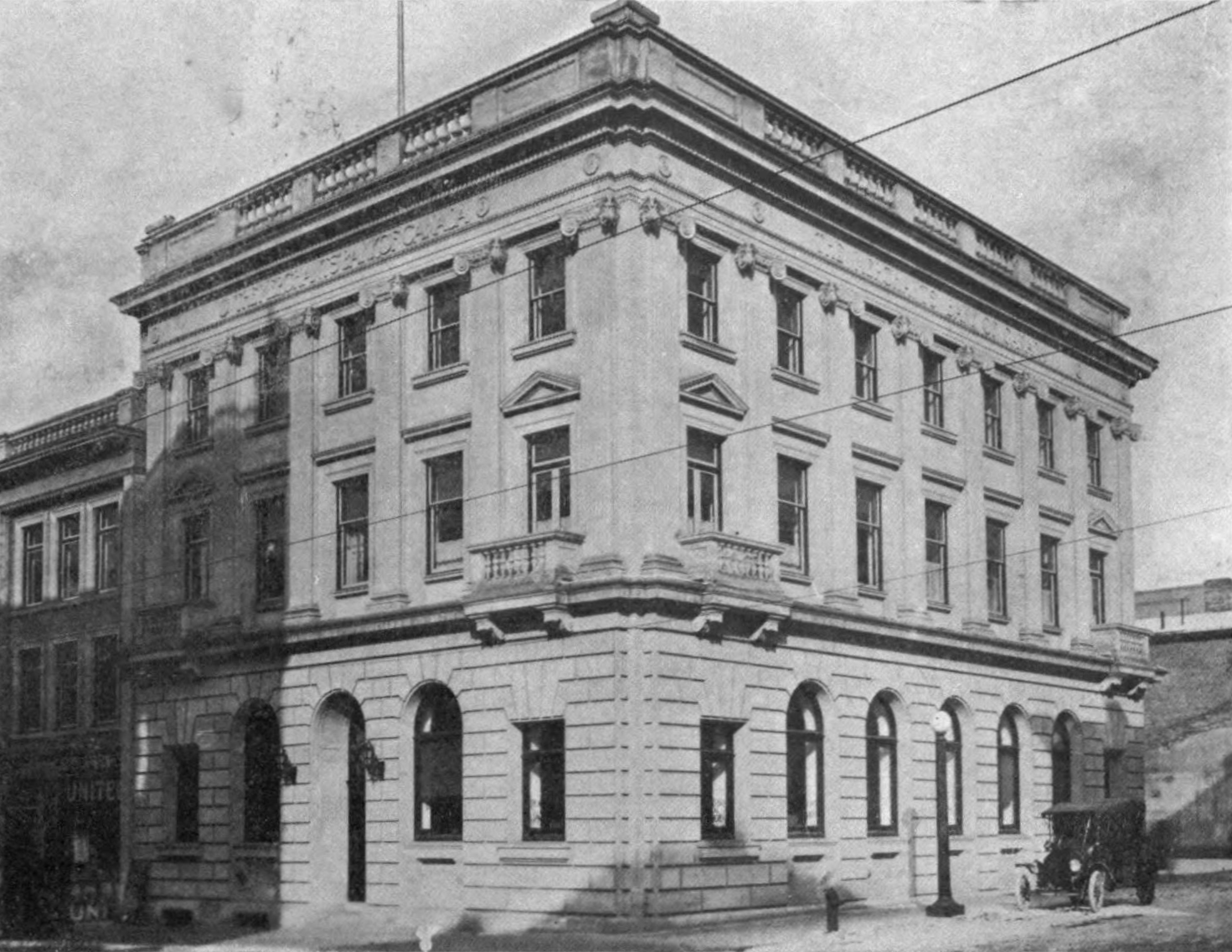
Kitchener

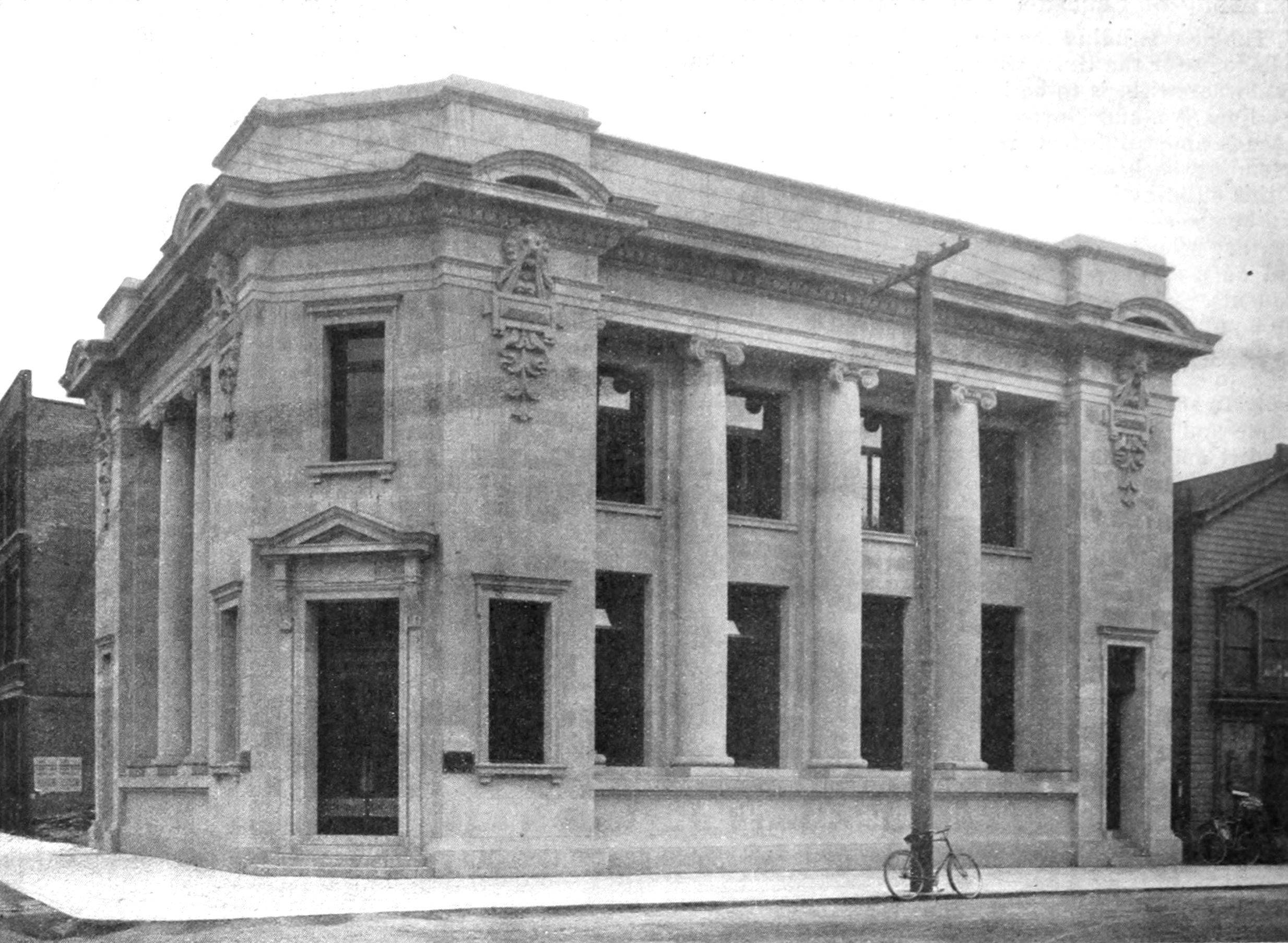
Victoria

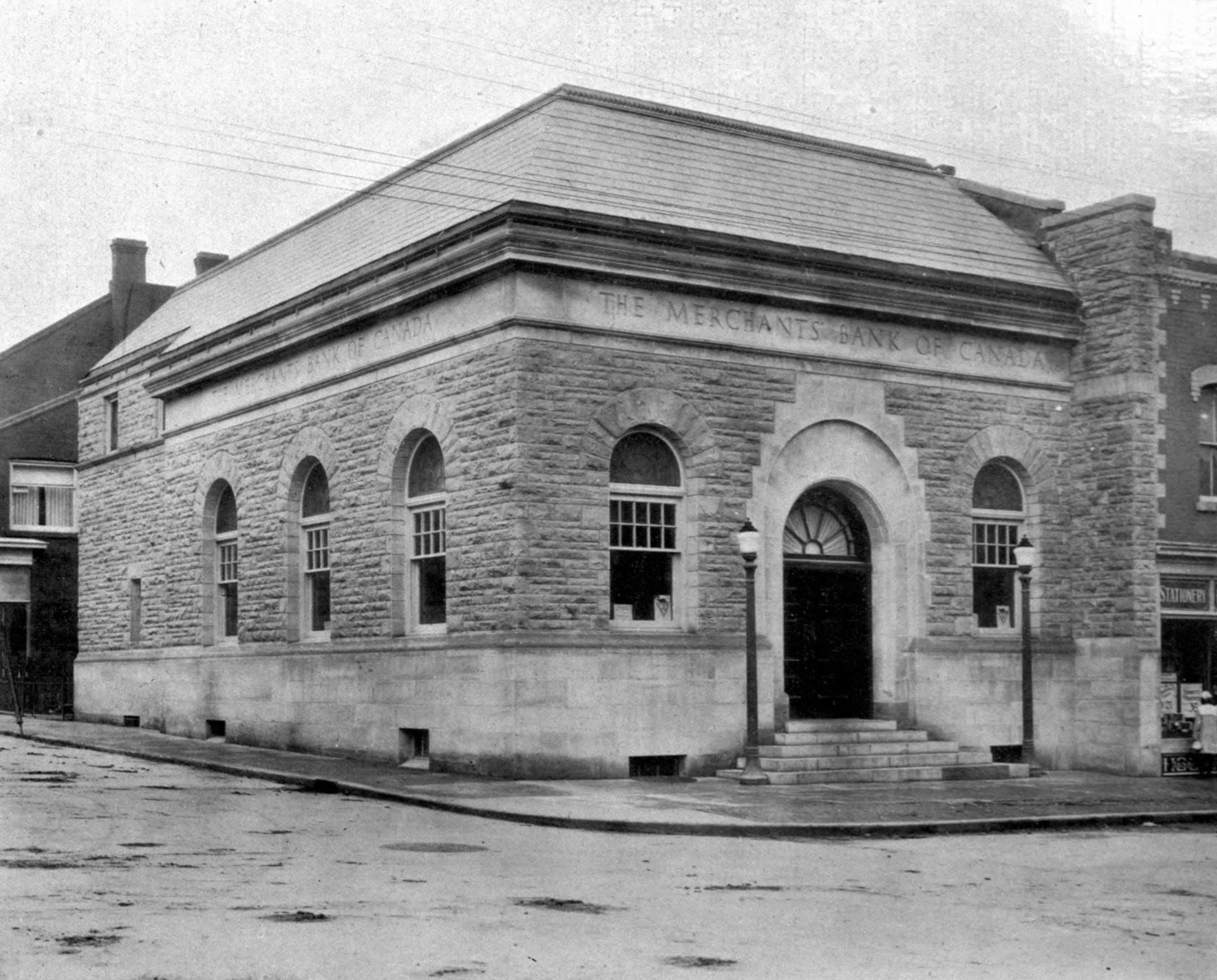
Georgetown

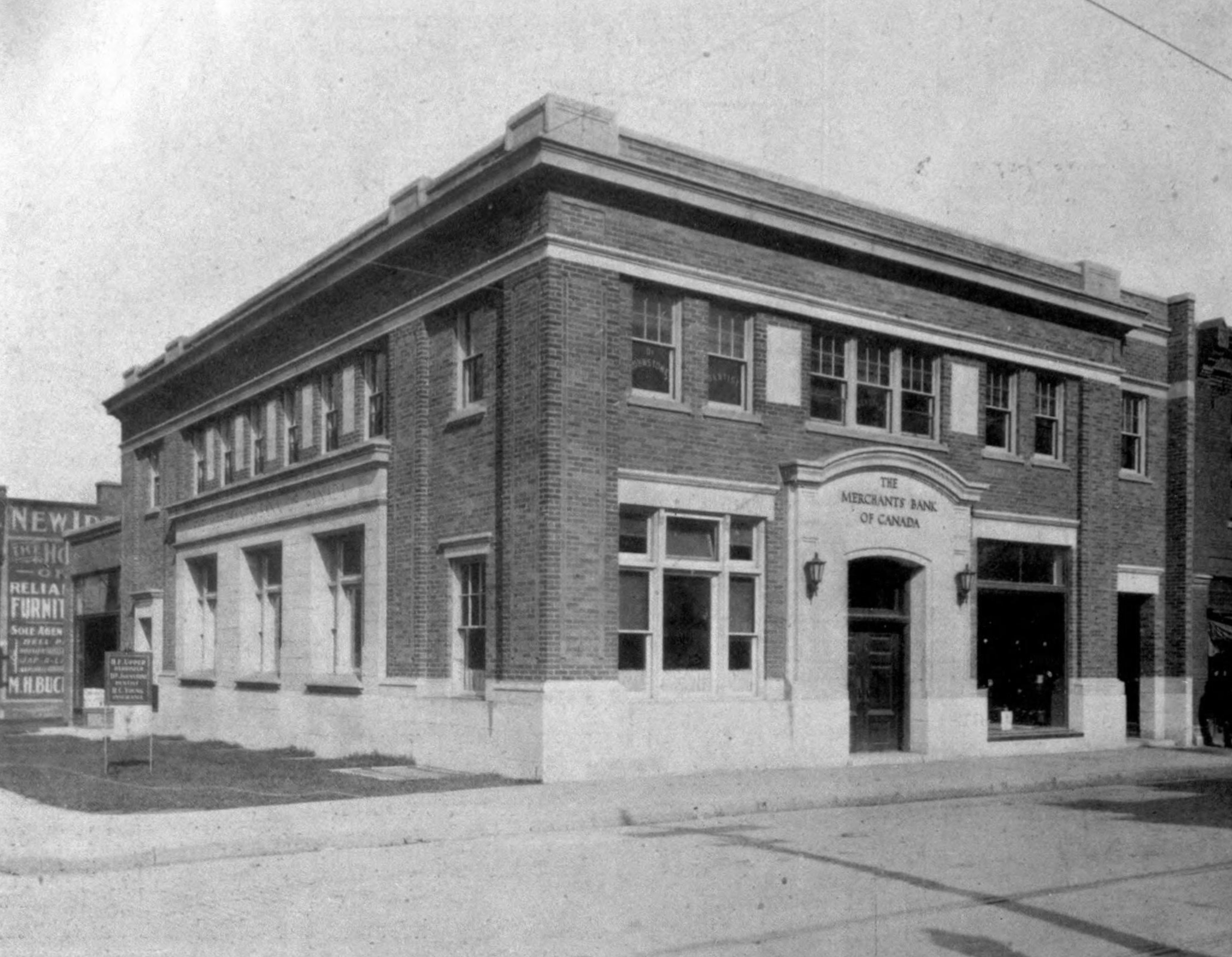
Niagara Falls

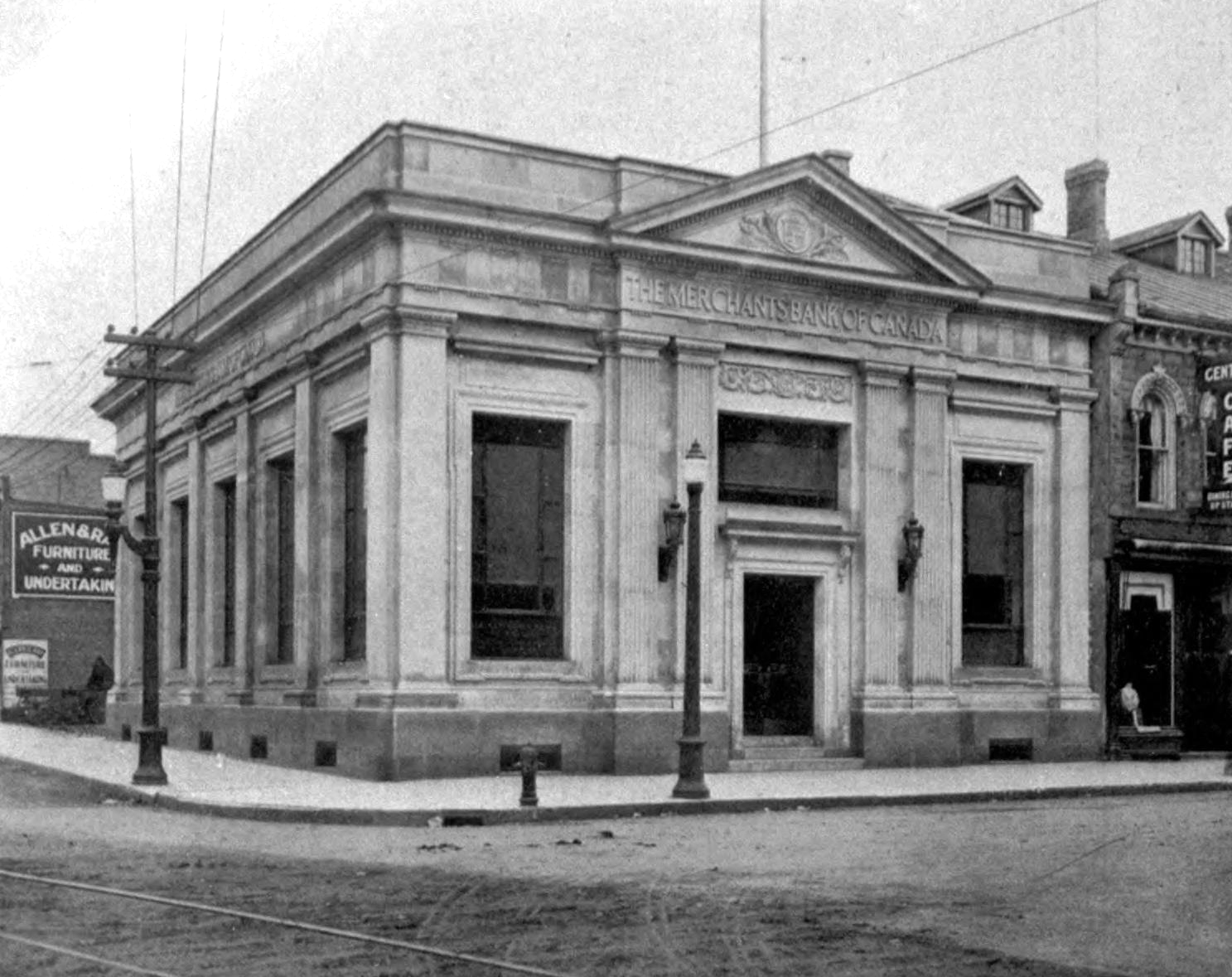
Galt

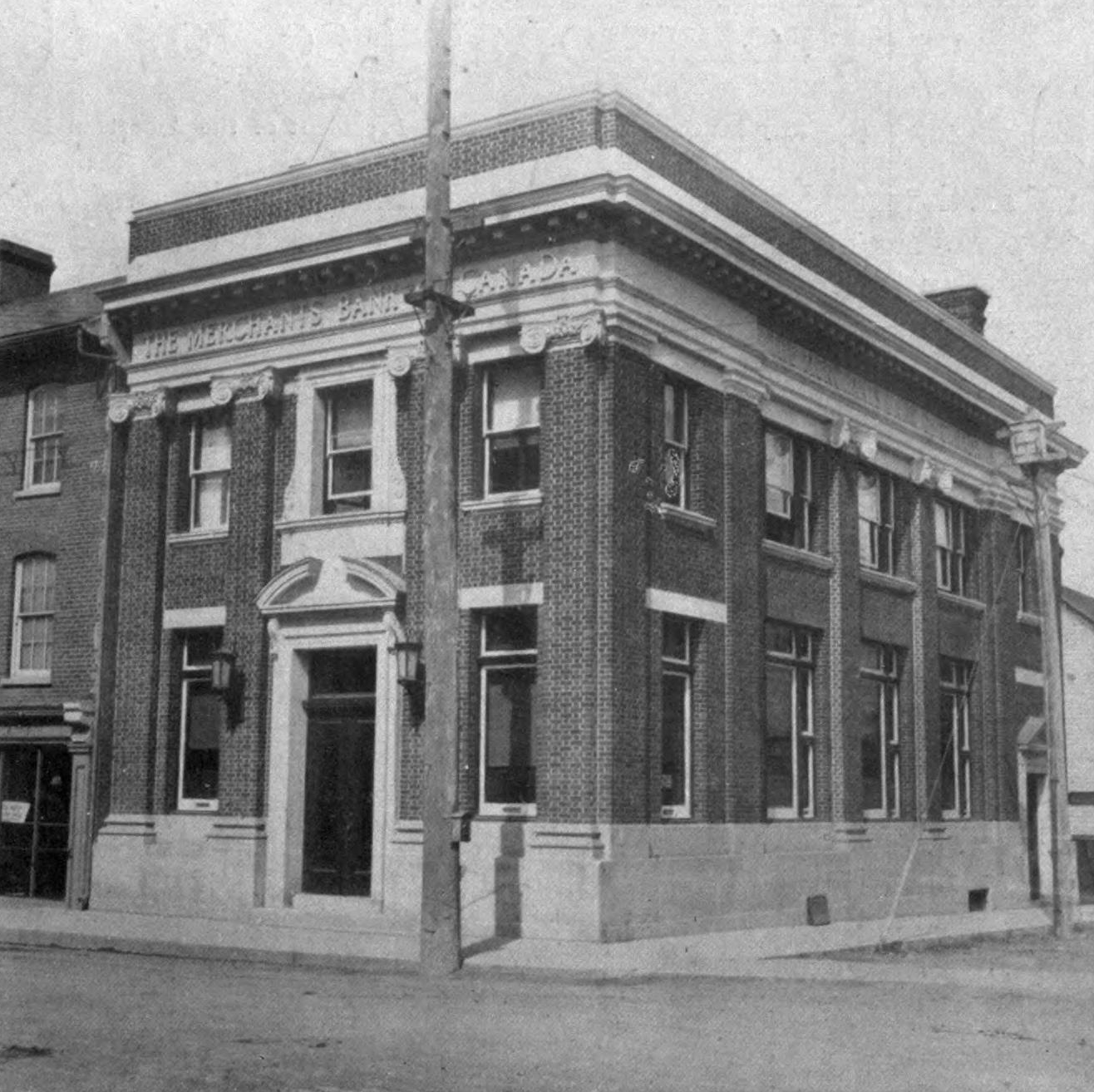
Pembroke

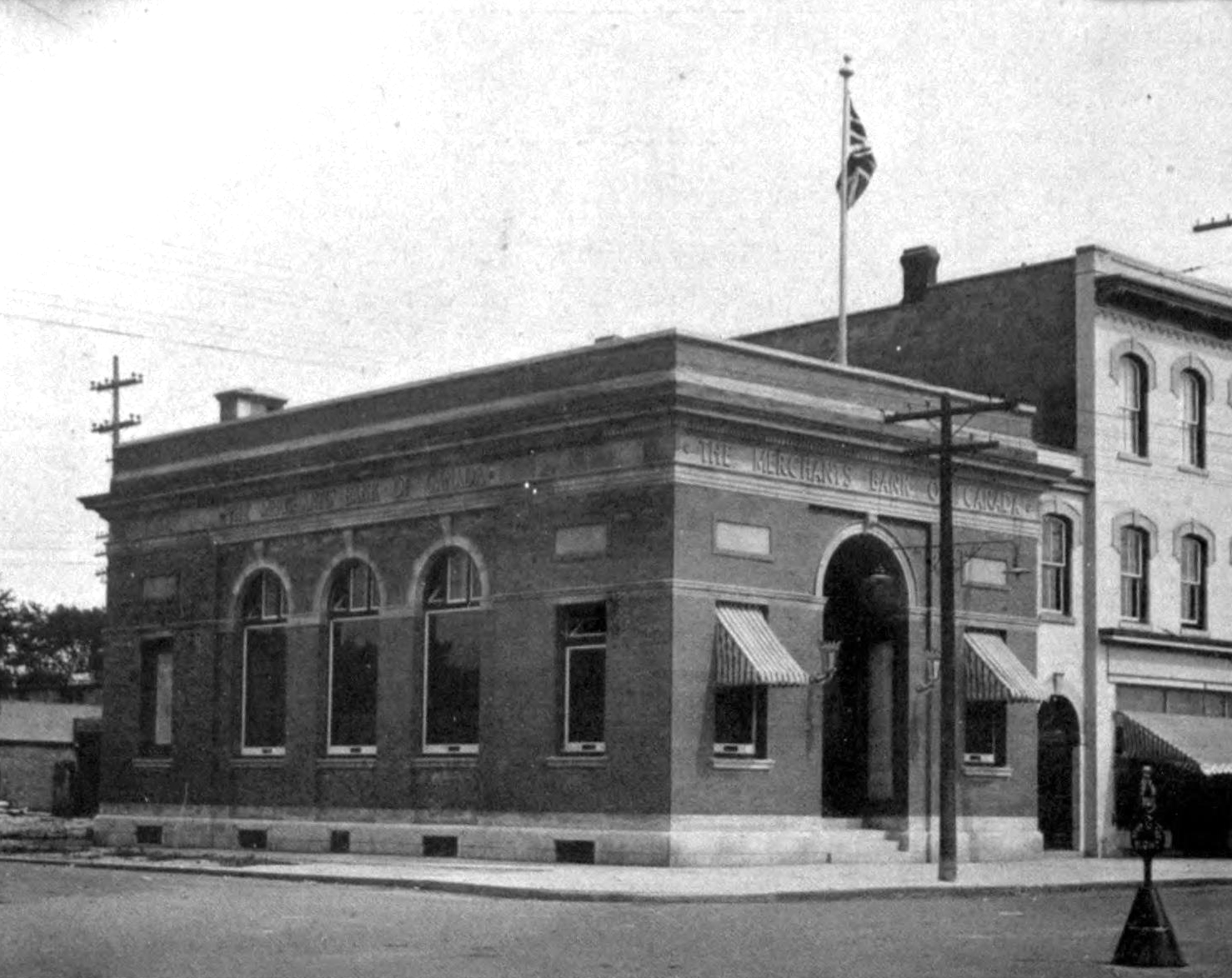
Collingwood

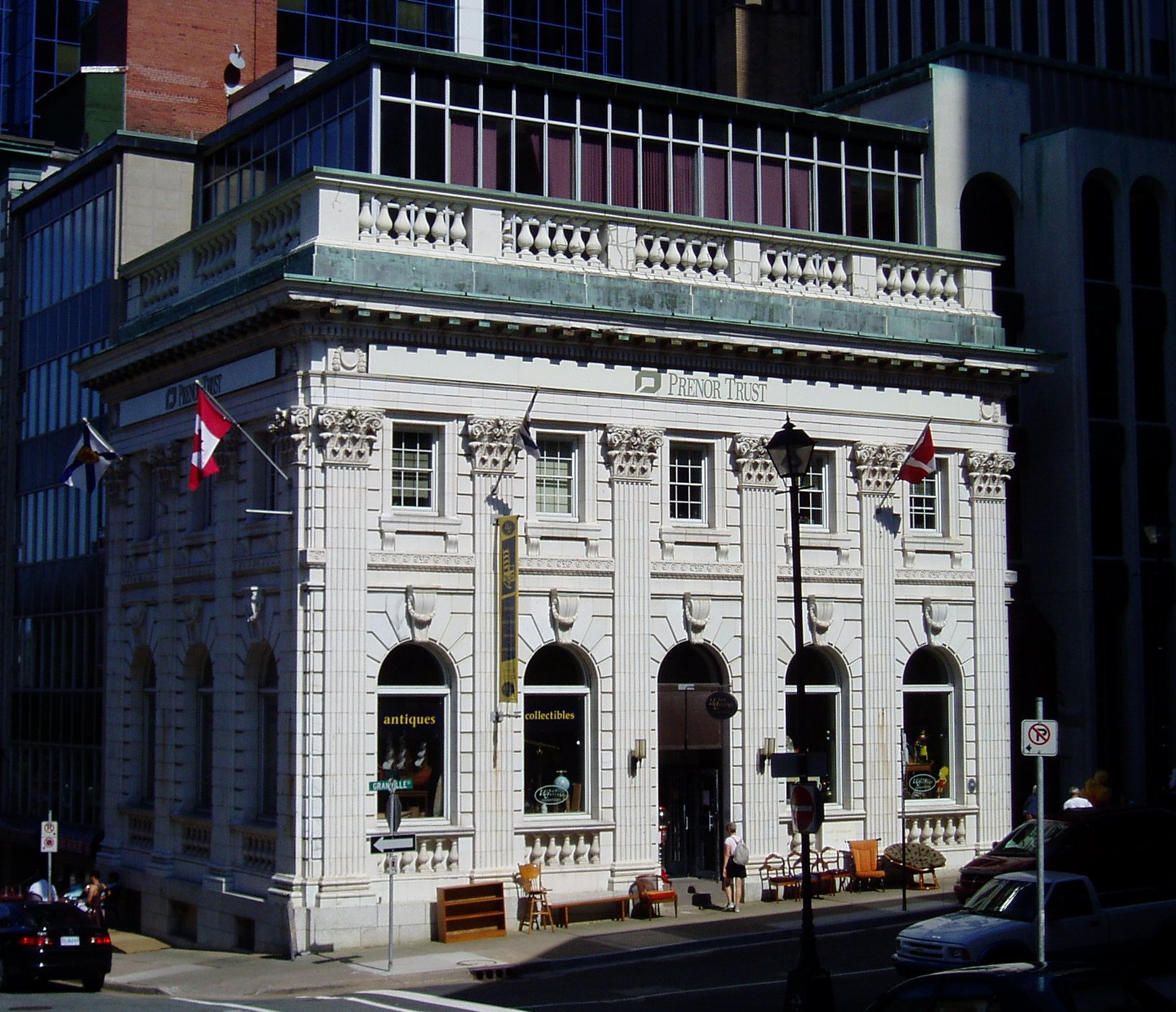
Halifax

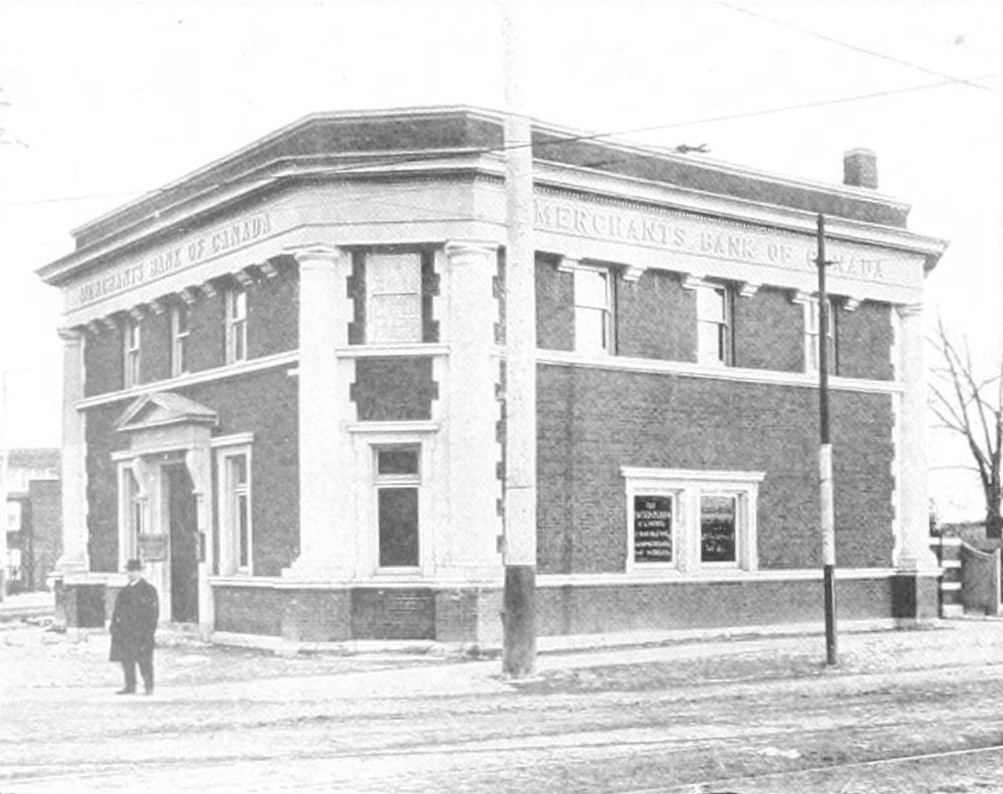
Toronto (Dundas & Roncesvalles)

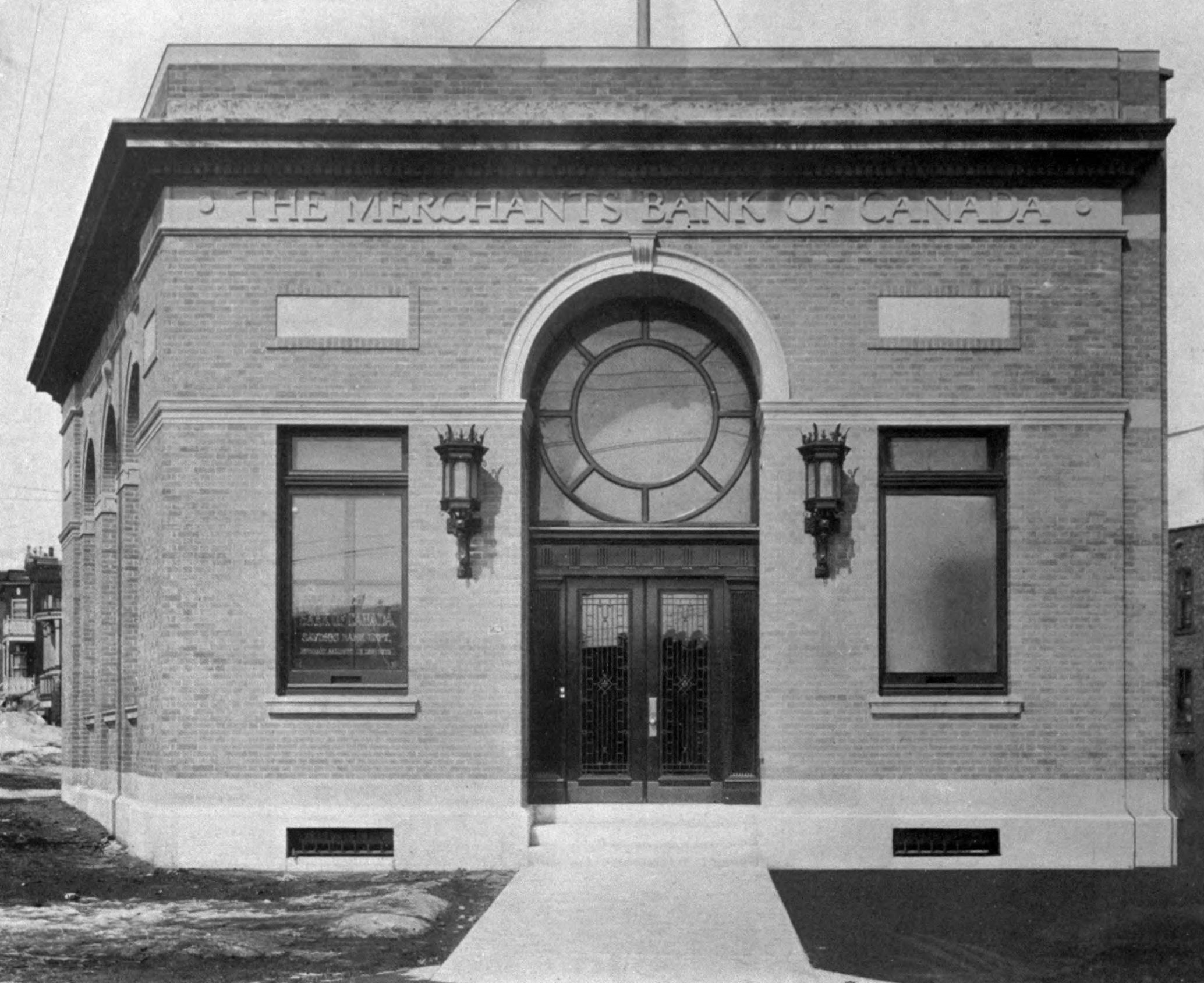
Montreal (Sherbrooke & Harvard)
