= George Campbell MacDougall =

George Campbell MacDougall (1843 - March 31, 1892) was a Montreal stockbroker of the MacDougall Brothers firm (today known as MacDougall, MacDougall & MacTier) and a driving force behind the creation of the Montreal Stock Exchange, of which he was Chairman.

== Early life ==
Known as Campbell, he was born in Devon, England. He was the youngest son of Major Peter MacDougall (1774-1861), of the 25th Regiment of Foot, by his second wife, Elizabeth Stancomb. In the 1850s, his family moved to Outremont, Canada East, joining Campbell's elder half brother, (Dugald) Lorn MacDougall who lived in Montreal. Campbell's father was immediately active with the Montreal Hunt and Campbell was a skilled horseman who later won competitions in the New York Horseshows. He was educated at the High School of Montreal and McGill University.

== Career ==
Through the influence of his elder brother, Lorn, Campbell MacDougall started his career with the Bank of Montreal. By the 1860s, he was working at the Bank's New York City office, before joining a brokerage firm there. He returned to Montreal in 1866, working for MacDougall & Davidson (run by his brother Lorn), stock and bill brokers, and MacDougall & Budden (run by his brother Leigh), produce brokers. By the late 1860s, in partnership with a younger brother, (Hartland) St. Clair MacDougall (brother-in-law of both Sir Hugh and Andrew Allan), he formed the firm of MacDougall Brothers, stockbrokers, of St. Francois Xavier Street, Montreal. The firm sold stocks and bonds through New York City, London, Montreal and Toronto. In 1876, he assisted his brothers, Lorn and St. Clair, in winning a major role in the $500,000 stock issue by the Bell Telephone Company of Canada which cemented Lorn's reputation as the leader of Montreal's financial community. Campbell and St. Clair MacDougall's firm gained an extensive clientele and turned over a large amount of business. Campbell died aged forty nine, but in his comparatively short life he had achieved distinction in the financial world, serving as Chairman of the Montreal Stock Exchange. He and his three brothers were the driving force behind the creation of the Exchange.

== Family ==
In 1875, at Montreal, Campbell MacDougall married Grace Brydges (d.1883), daughter of Charles John Brydges. The MacDougalls lived on Sherbrooke Street, Montreal and they were the parents of one son, Hartland Brydges MacDougall. After his wife died in 1883, MacDougall was remarried in 1887 to Mary Louise MacDonald (1857-1951), daughter of Major Donald Alexander MacDonald (1817-1896) of Glengarry County, Ontario. They were the parents of one daughter, Mary Beatrice. Campbell MacDougall was remembered as a sportsman, expert rider and the owner of several fine horses.
