= Hugh Allan =

Shipping magnate, financier and capitalist

Sir Hugh Allan
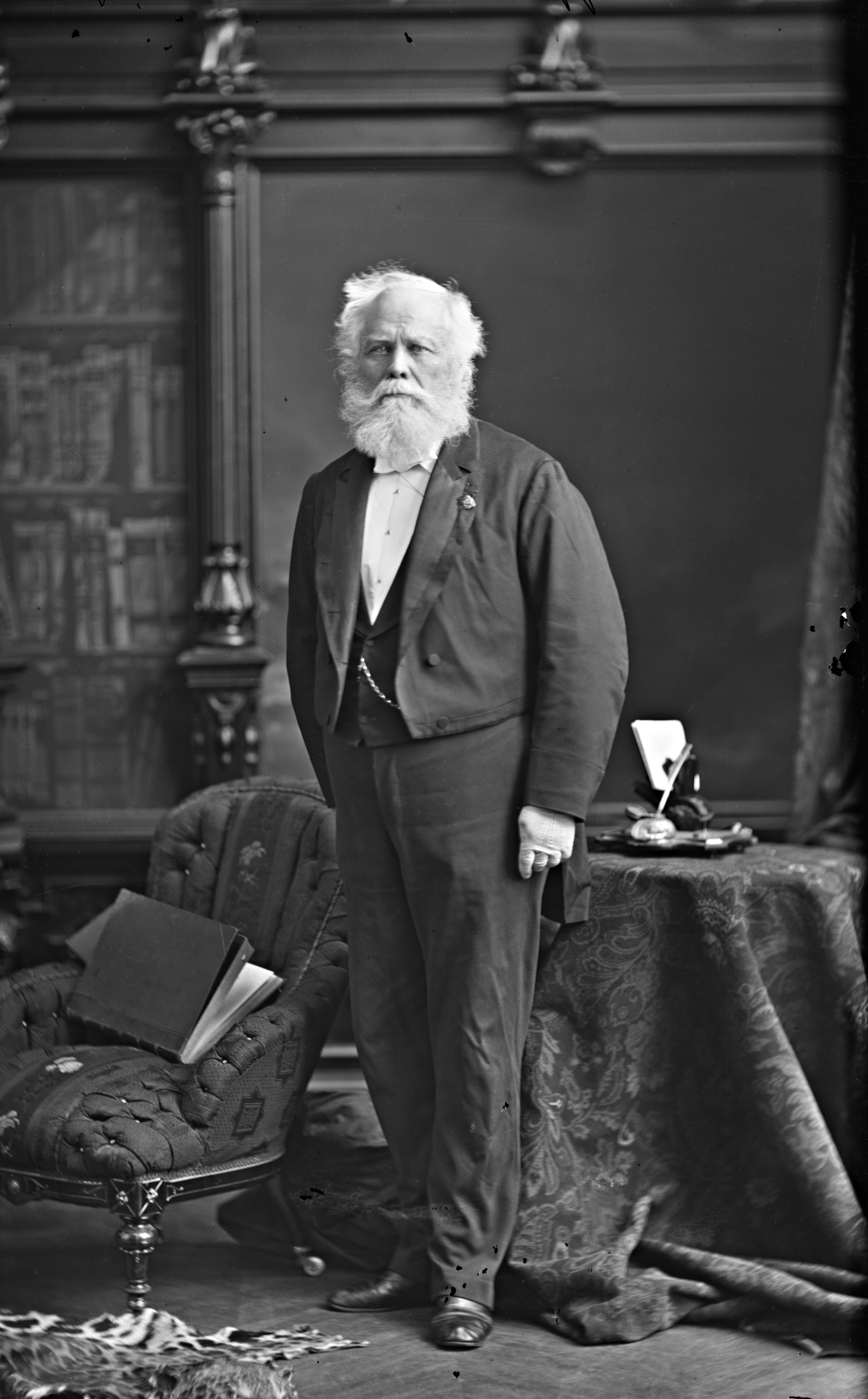
- Allan in 1879.
- Born: 29 September 1810; Saltcoats, North Ayrshire, Scotland, UK
- Died: 9 December 1882 (aged 72); Edinburgh, Scotland, UK
- Occupation: Businessman
- Known for: Allan Shipping Line of Montreal
- Spouse: Matilda Caroline Smith (m. 1844; d. 1881)
- Children: 13, including Sir Montagu Allan

Sir Hugh Allan (September 29, 1810 – December 9, 1882) was a Scottish-Canadian shipping magnate, financier and capitalist. By the time of his death, the Allan Shipping Line had become the largest privately owned shipping empire in the world. He was responsible for transporting millions of British immigrants to Canada, and the businesses that he established from Montreal filtered across every sphere of Canadian life, cementing his reputation as an empire builder. His home, Ravenscrag, was the principal residence of the Golden Square Mile in Montreal.

== Early years in Scotland ==
Born at Saltcoats in North Ayrshire, Scotland, he was the second son of Captain Alexander Allan and Jean Crawford (1782–1856). He was a first cousin of Sir Alexander Tilloch Galt, and his father was a first cousin of the Scottish bard, Robert Burns. In 1819, Allan's father established the Allan Shipping Line, which became synonymous with transporting goods and passengers between Scotland and Montreal. Allan received a parish education at Saltcoats before starting work in 1823 at the family's counting house of Allan, Kerr & Co., of Greenock. Three years later, he was sent by his father to Montreal to work as a clerk for a grain merchant, William Kerr. In 1830, he took a year off to travel through his native Scotland (he later named his home, Ravenscrag, after his favourite childhood haunt in Ayrshire) and continued via London, New York and Upper Canada.

== Rise of the Allan Line at Montreal ==
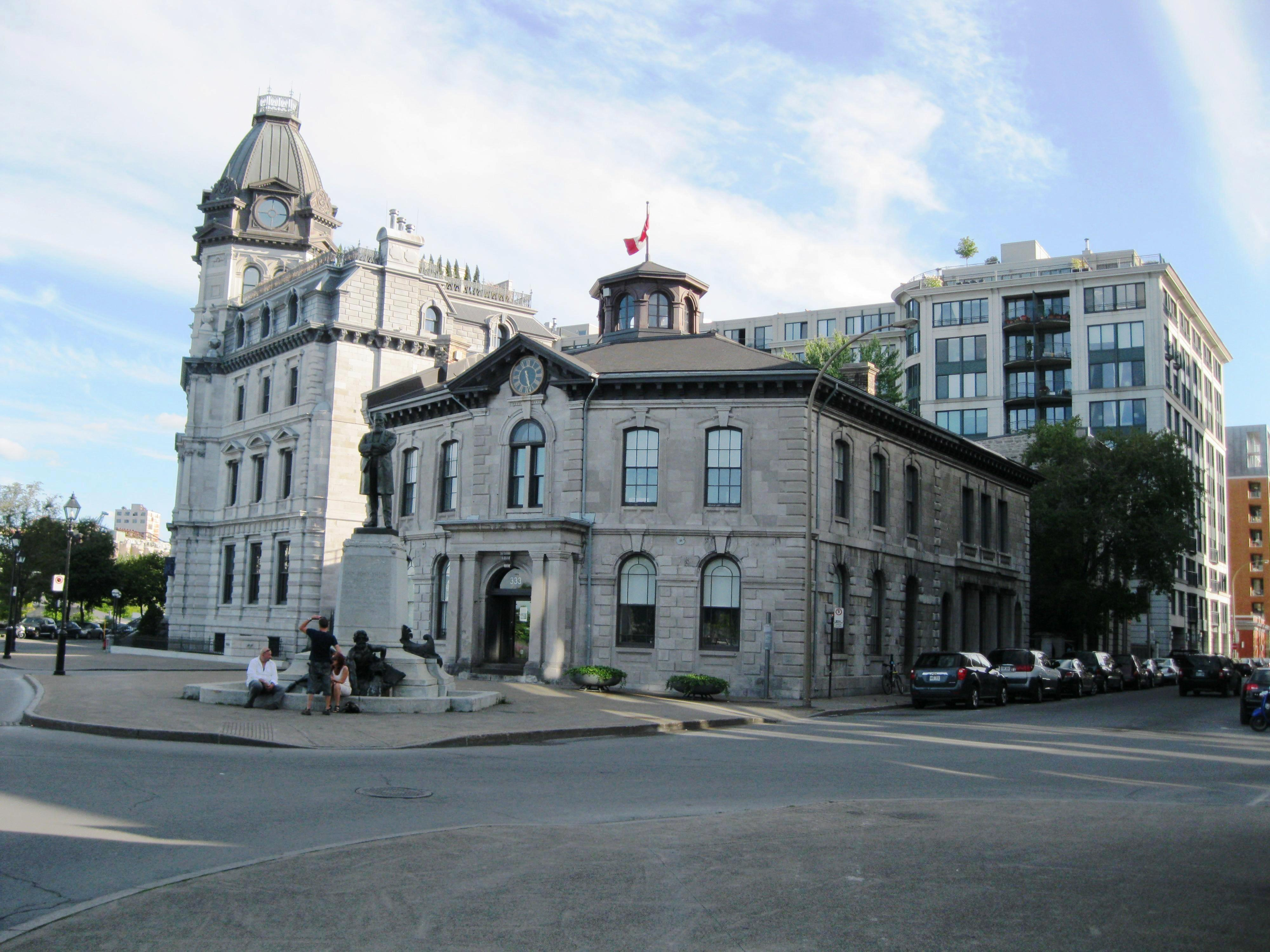
The offices of H & A Allan by the Montreal harbour (built in 1863)

Returning to Montreal in 1831, Allan became a commission merchant with one of the city's leading importers, who had also acted as the Montreal agent for his family's company, J & A Allan, back in Scotland. Concentrating on shipping, shipbuilding and purchasing grain, Allan advanced rapidly, aided by capital raised and contacts gained through family connections, as well as social bonds he developed himself in the predominantly Scottish business community at Montreal. By 1835, Allan was made a partner in the firm that from then was known as Millar, Edmonstone & Co. With his father's encouragement and capital, Allan expanded the company's shipping operations, and J & A Allan (then headed by his elder brother, James, in Glasgow) became closely involved with building of the merchant fleet. By the time (1839) Hugh's younger brother, Andrew, had joined now Edmonstone, Allan & Co., it had the largest shipping capacity of any Montreal-based firm.

By the 1850s, Edmonstone & Allan was described by a credit-rating service as an "old, safe and respectable House... one of the wealthiest concerns in the Province", known for its responsible management and its links to trading houses in London, Liverpool, and Glasgow. Helped by Allan's spreading influence into allied shipping, railway and banking concerns, the firm was "as good as a bank". From 1863, the company became known as H & A Allan, of Montreal — one segment, but an important and intricate part of the Allan family's empire.

== The Allan Royal Mail Line ==
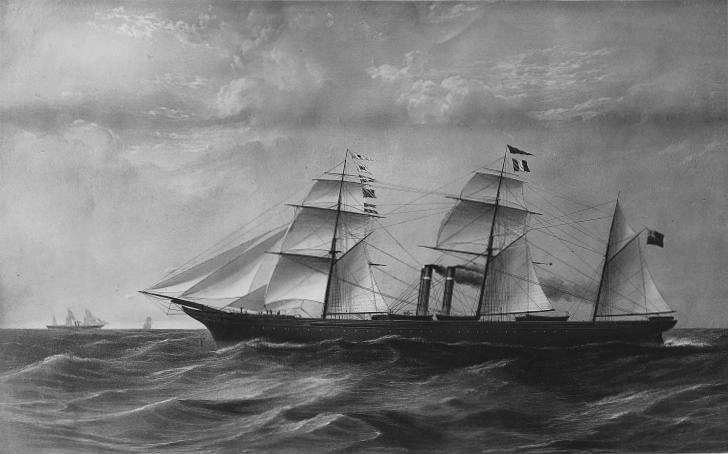
The Canadian, 1855; along with the Indian, these superior ships helped Allan to secure the Royal Mail contract in 1856

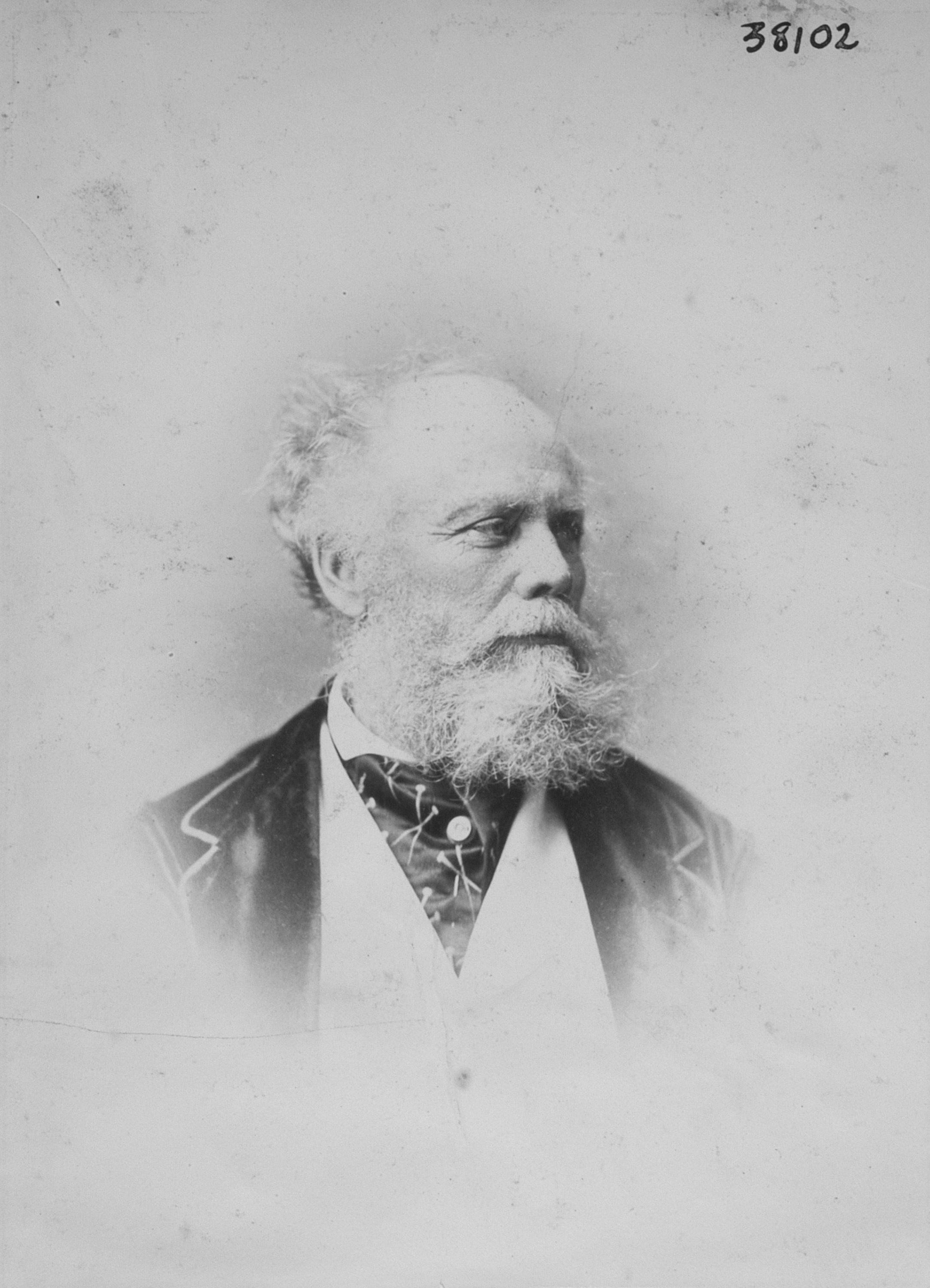
Sir Hugh Allan in 1869. Taken by William Notman in his studio in Montreal.

In 1851, Hugh Allan had been elected President of the Montreal Board of Trade. As an entrepreneur and the chosen head of Montreal's business community, he used this position to advocate for the establishment of a regular government-subsidised steamship line between Britain, Montreal and Portland. The service, Allan declared, would deliver Royal Mail to both sides of the Atlantic Ocean while transporting immigrants to North America. Though it was Allan's idea, competition for the contract was fierce. Despite significant support on both sides of the Atlantic and careful preparation, Allan lost the bid in 1853. However, the consortium that won the contract, headed by Samuel Cunard, ran into trouble almost immediately and Allan reacted by building more ships on the Clyde, using superior technology (notably the Canadian and the Indian). These ships formed the nucleus of Allan's Montreal Ocean Steamship Company, incorporated by him and his brother, Andrew, in 1856. It was carefully created to be Canadian, but it was inextricably linked (and financed) by the Allan family in Scotland. In 1856, with the help of conservative politicians such as Sir John Rose, Sir George-Étienne Cartier and Lewis Drummond, the Montreal Ocean Steamship Company (popularly referred to as the Allan Line) wrested back the contract from Samuel Cunard. By 1859, service was weekly, and Allan reported his capital investment in the company at £3.5 million.

Beyond mail and emigrating passengers, the Allan Line carried royalty (converting one of its ships with no expense nor detail to attention spared), troops (in the Crimean and Zulu wars), general cargo, manufactured goods and much needed Canadian wheat to Britain. After the Victoria Bridge opened in 1859, Allan became dependent on the Grand Trunk Railway and signed a ten-year deal with them. But he soon became frustrated with the railway when he wanted them to triple their deliveries from the American Midwest, and he felt threatened by the railway's plans to form a steamship line of its own with rival firms in New York and Boston. By 1873, Allan expressed "a desire to protect ourselves".

== Railways and the Pacific Scandal ==
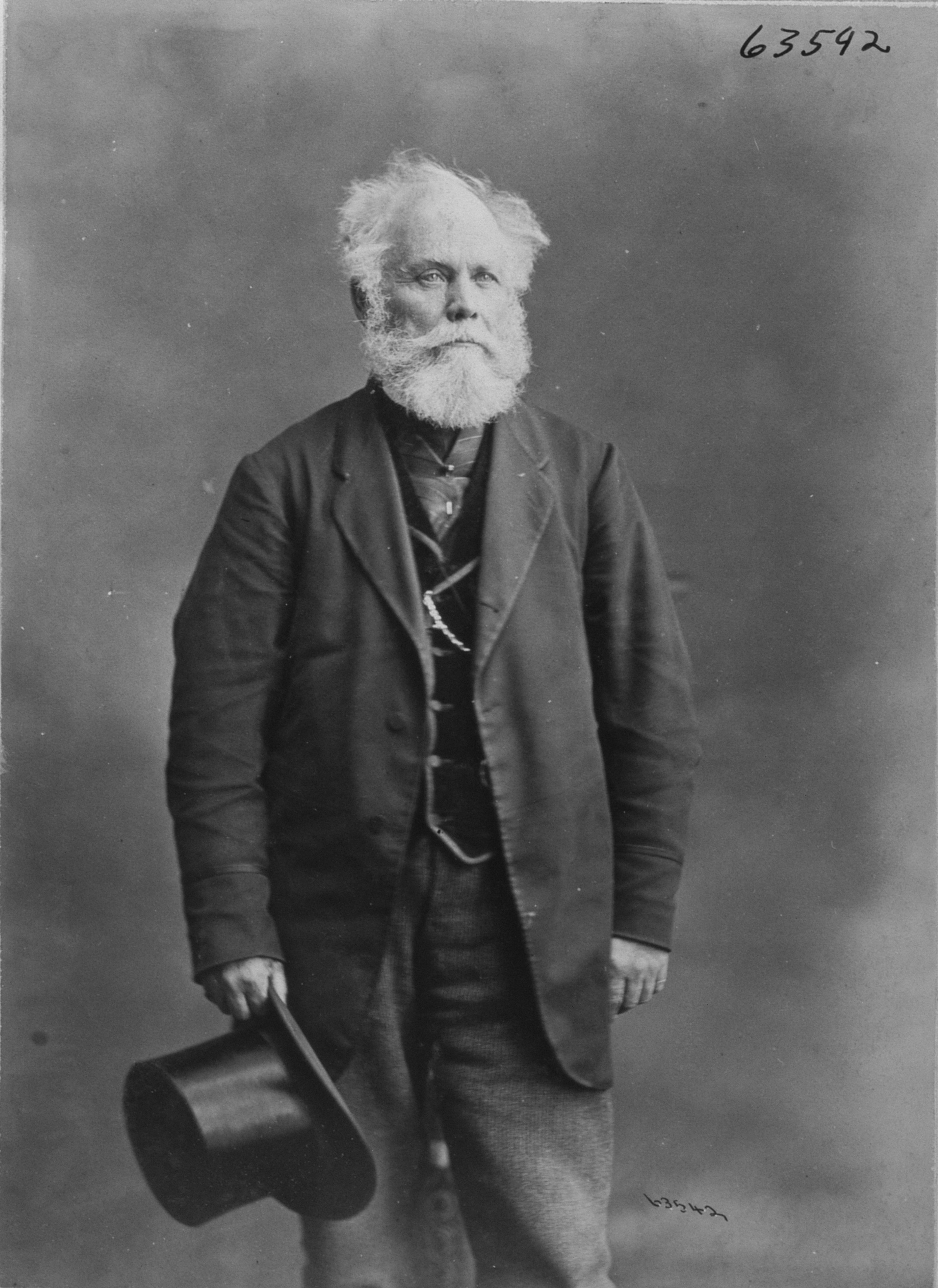
Sir Hugh Allan in 1871. Taken by William Notman in his studio.

At the same time that Allan was falling out with the Grand Trunk Railway, the Canadian government had committed to building a railway across to British Columbia. Though slow to move into the railway business, by the 1870s, Allan had become Canada's most flamboyant railway entrepreneur. He helped to place trusted colleagues (such as his lawyer John Abbott, agent Louis Beaubien and the politician John Hamilton) in senior positions with railways connected to the venture. Allan himself invested heavily, particularly in those that would link the Port of Montreal to the Canadian West, and he became president of the Montreal Northern Colonization Railway in 1871. Garnering the support of French-Canada (helped in a large part by his relationship with Antoine Labelle), Allan's railway gained major benefits in Quebec, including a $1 million subscription from the City of Montreal. Allan was reckoned the most influential capitalist in 1870s Canada, and having staved off American interest in the Pacific Railway, he was the logical choice for winning the contract.

He created a syndicate to build the national railway, promised as a condition of British Columbia joining Confederation. To ensure the contract, he bribed Prime Minister Sir John A. Macdonald, subscribing over $350,000 for Macdonald's re-election campaign in 1872, but the Pacific Scandal (and Macdonald's defeat) ended his dreams of supremacy in the railway business. However, through his bank, the Merchants' Bank of Canada, he still financed and maintained a vested interest in many of the Canadian railway companies.

== Merchants' Bank of Canada ==
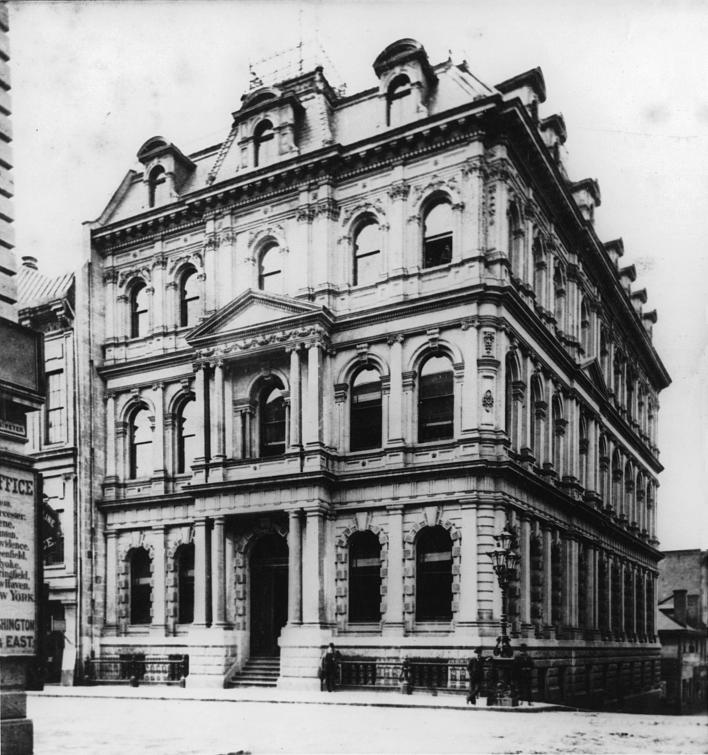
Merchant's Bank Building on St. James Street, Montreal, 1870

While still in his thirties, Allan became a director of the Bank of Montreal and remained on the board for ten years (1847–57). He also held significant shares in the Commercial Bank of Canada, the Bank of Upper Canada, the Maritime Bank of the Dominion of Canada, and the City Bank of Montreal. He was a director of the Montreal Credit Company and president of the Provincial Permanent Building Society, which became the Provincial Loan Company in 1875. Allan founded Merchant's Bank of Canada in Montreal in 1864, with a capital of $6.78 million and a reserve fund of $6.8 million.

To service his financial needs and as a source of capital, Allan established the Merchant's Bank of Canada. Run as a family business, it was chartered in 1861 but did not open until 1864. Allan served as president of the bank until his death, when he was succeeded by his brother, Andrew. The bank soon became known as one of Canada's most aggressive. They took over the failing Commercial Bank of Canada, and by the mid-1870s had branches in New York and London.

Allan's association with the bank facilitated his growth in other profitable ventures. Allan had interests in new communications technology, manufacturing, and mining. In 1852, he became president of the Montreal Telegraph Company, ultimately selling MTC's "telephone plant" to Bell Telephone for $75,000. He also established coal mines in Nova Scotia and factories for textiles, shoes, paper, tobacco, and iron and steel in Central Canada. The Merchants Bank Building on 92-94 Water Street, Charlottetown, Prince Edward Island, built in 1871, is on the Registry of Historical Places of Canada.

== Ravenscrag ==
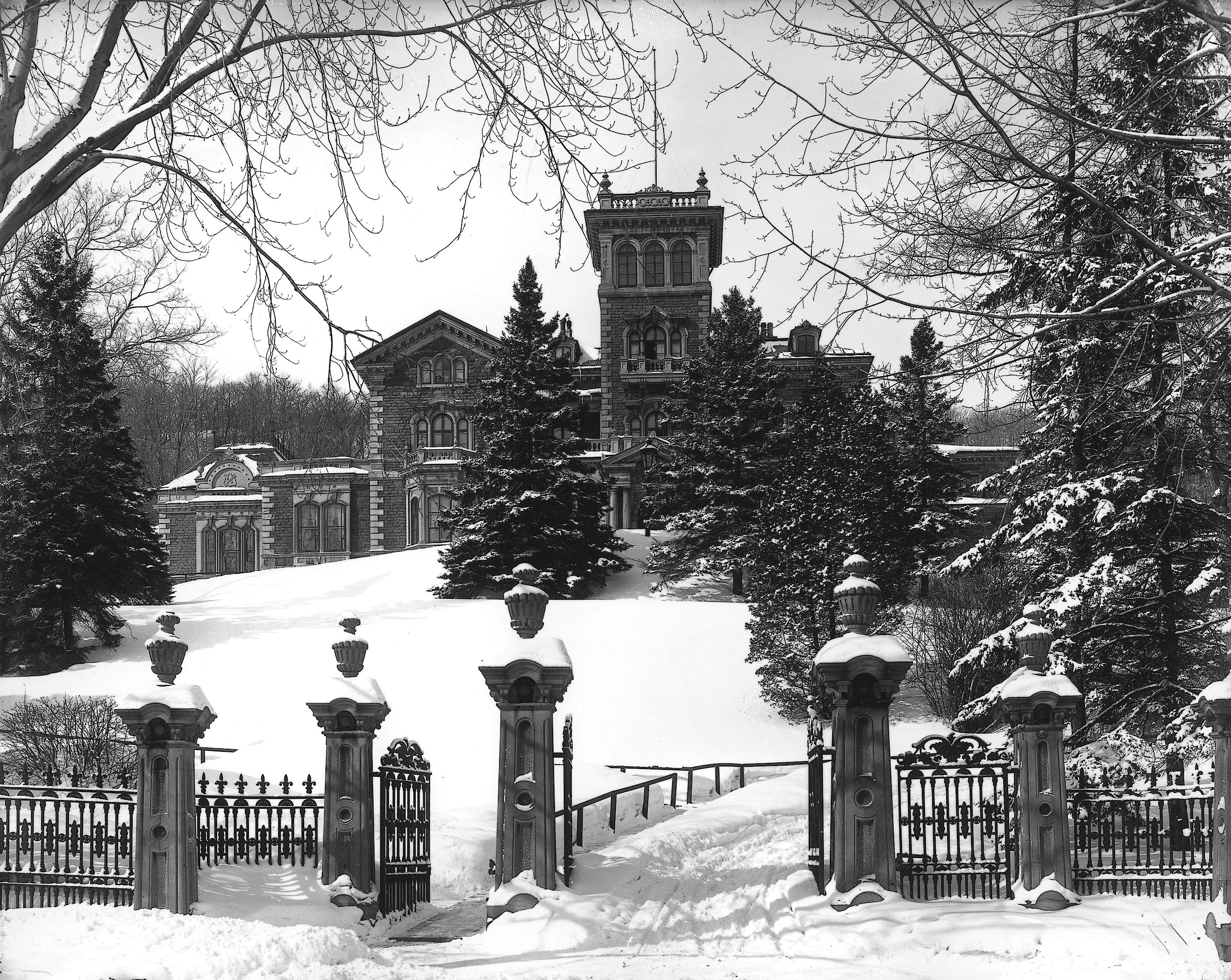
Ravenscrag, Allan's home in Montreal's Golden Square Mile, completed in 1863

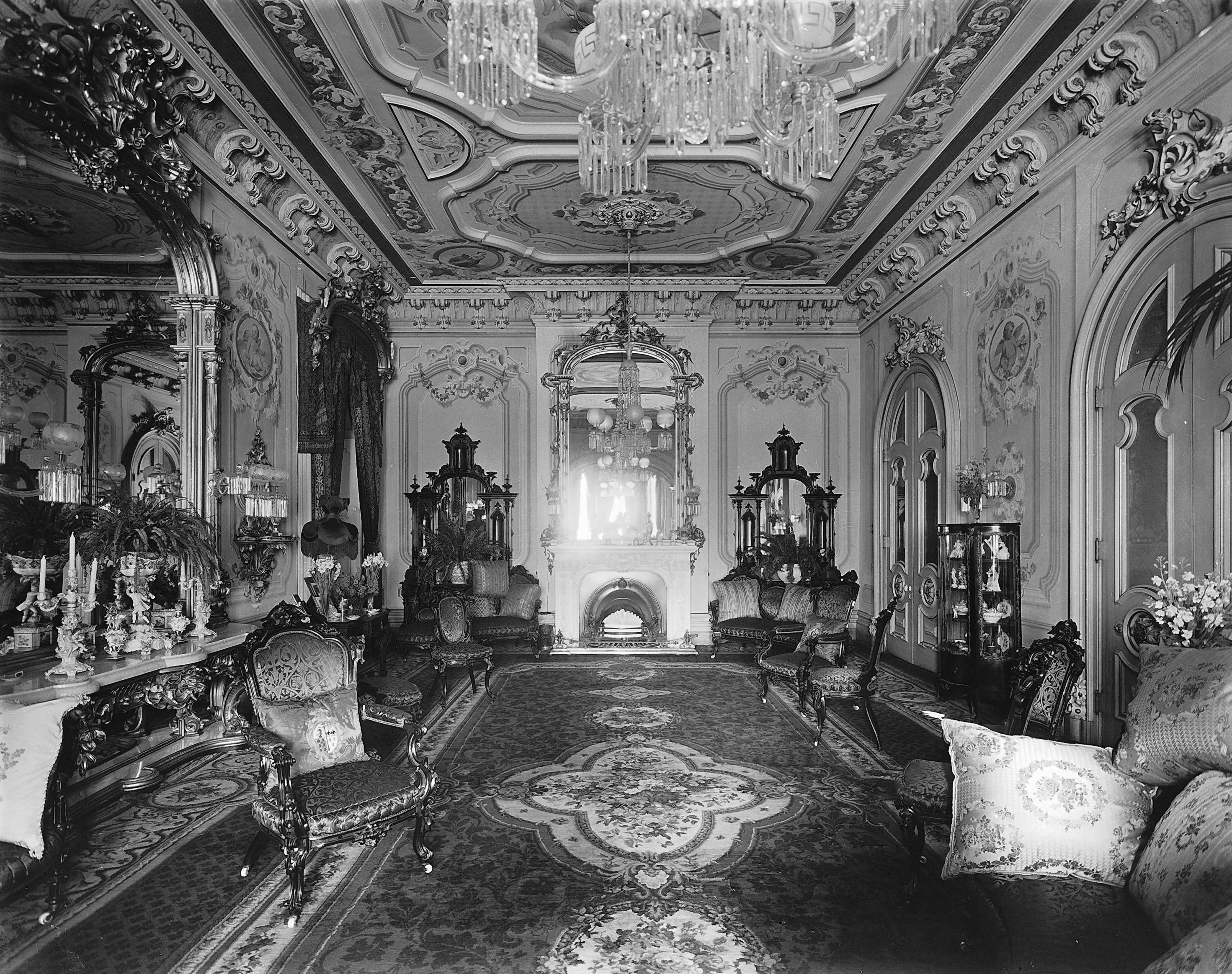
The drawing room at Ravenscrag

In 1853, Allan bought part of the estate of Simon McTavish to his new home, Ravenscrag, a sumptuous Italian Renaissance style house and the principal residence of the Golden Square Mile. The house, which surpassed Dundurn Castle in scale and grandeur, was completed in two years in 1863, and the ballroom alone could comfortably accommodate several hundred guests.

After his death in 1882, his second son, Sir Montagu Allan, lived in the house. In 1940, he donated it to the Royal Victoria Hospital, Montreal. The Allans entertained Prince Arthur of Connaught, Lord Lisgar, the Earl of Dufferin, Viscount Wolseley, and others.

== Marriage and children ==
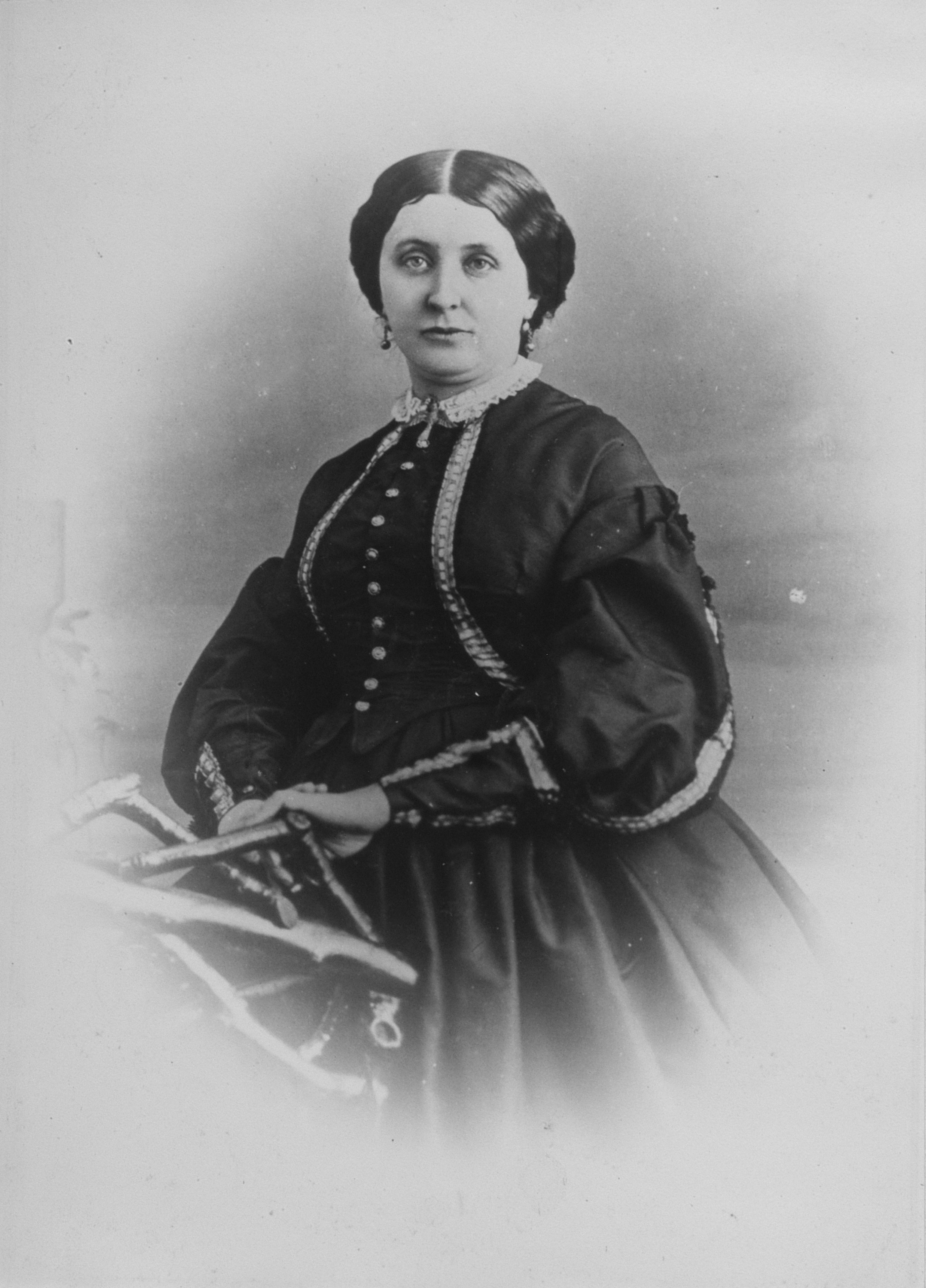
Allan's wife, Matilda Caroline Smith in 1881.

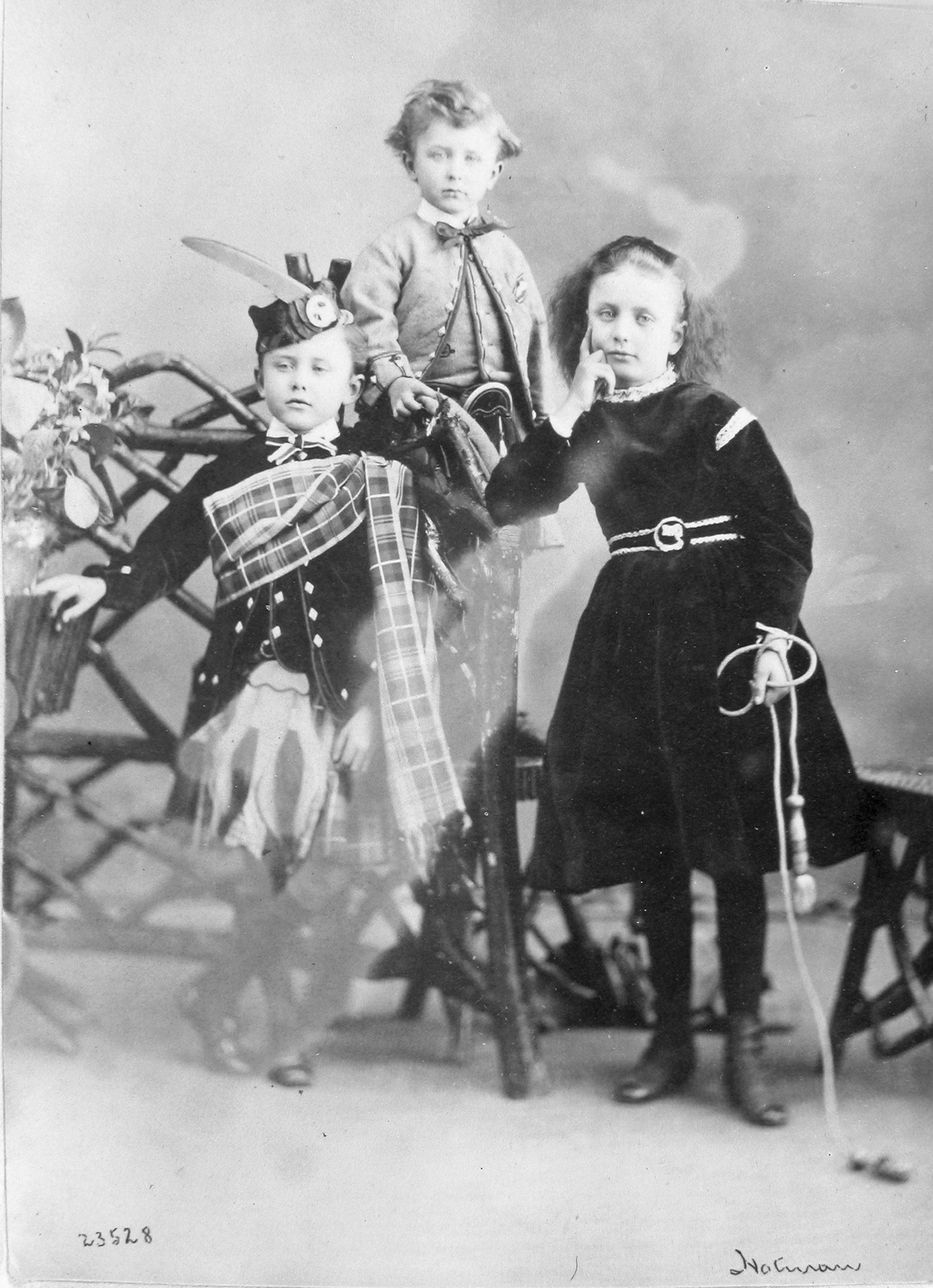
Maggie, Hugh and Bryce Allan taken by William Notman in 1866.

At Montreal on August 13, 1844, Allan married Matilda Caroline Smith (1828–1881), the eldest of the four daughters of Betsy Rea and her husband John Smith (d. 1872) of Athelstane Hall, Montreal. John Smith was a native of Athelstaneford in Scotland and became one of Montreal's leading dry goods merchants. Caroline's sister, Isabella, married Allan's brother Andrew in 1848. Her two other sisters married respectively Hartland St. Clair MacDougall (brother of George Campbell MacDougall) and James St. George Bellhouse, of the firm of Bellhouse & Dillon. Lady Allan died in Montreal in June 1881, aged 53.

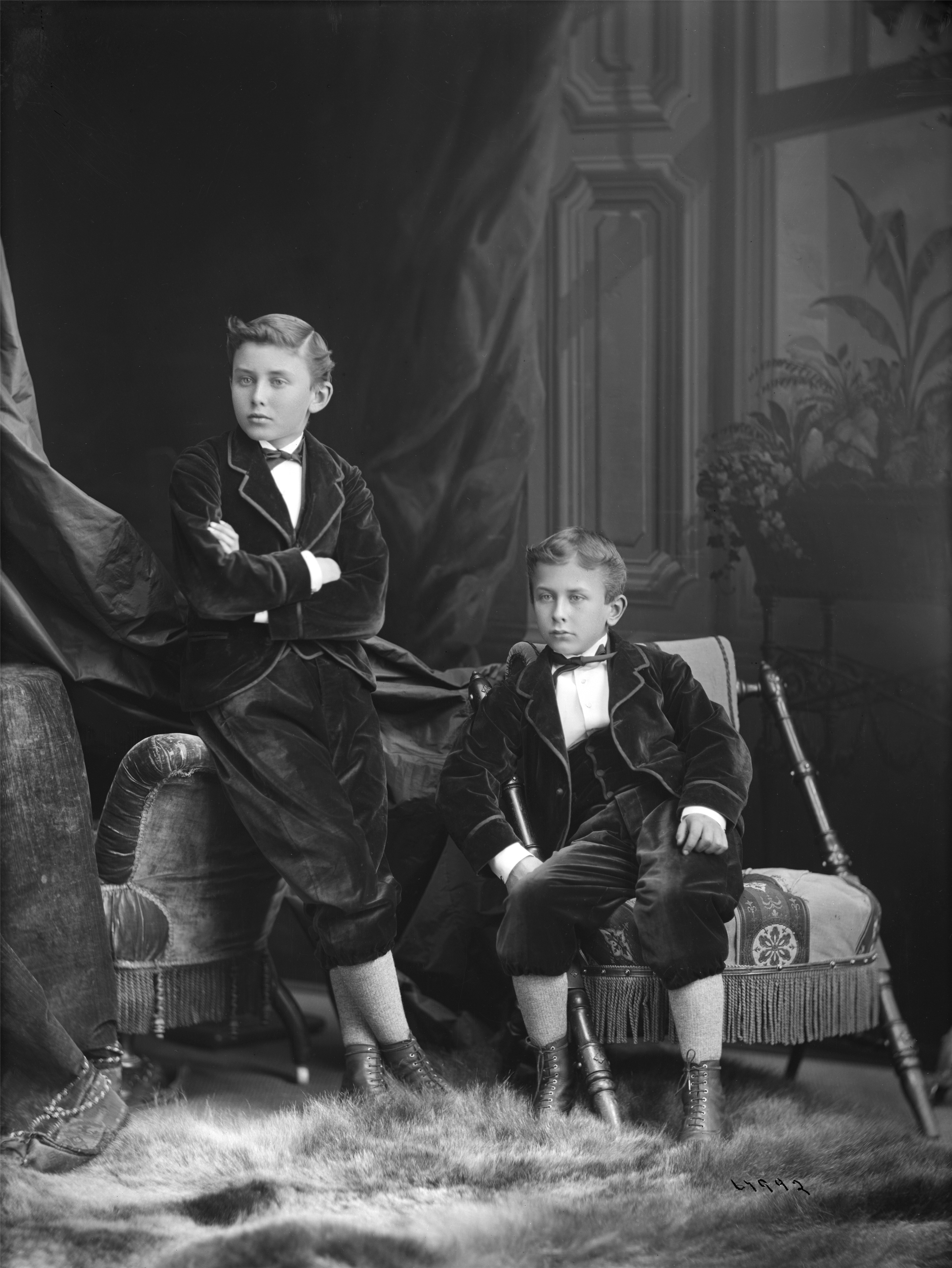
Allan's sons, Hugh and Bryce Allan taken in 1871.

They were the parents of nine daughters and four sons, including:

- Alexander Rea Allan (2 Aug 1845 – 29 Jun 1901), who "was not cut out for business". He married Eva Belford Travers, daughter of John N. Travers and a niece of General James Travers, V.C. The couple lived with their son, (Hugh) Travers, at 112 King Street in Brockville, Ontario, where he managed the Bank of Montreal office.
- Elizabeth Allan (9 Oct 1847 - 12 June 1921) married Asst-Surgeon (later Brigade-Surgeon) George Carson Gribbon, MB (1836-1894) in May 1867 while his regiment, the 25th (King's Own Borderers) Regiment of Foot, was garrisoned in Montreal. They had five children.
- Jane Crawford Allan (9 July 1849- 6 May 1931), married 21 Oct 1867, Asst-Surgeon (later Major) Thomas Dodd Milburne, whose regiment, the 13th Hussars, was stationed in Canada from 1866 to 1869.
- Phoebe Mary Allan (1852–1904), married on March 1, 1877, Sir George Lauderdale Houstoun-Boswall, 3rd Bart., grandson of General Sir William Houston, 1st Baronet. Lady Houstoun-Boswall was the mother of one daughter and two sons.
- Matilda Isabella Allan (1854–1932), died unmarried.
- Florence Adelaide Allan (1857–1942), married businessman Alfred H. White of Quebec City, and following his death, Major General J.F. Wilson. The White daughters, Gladys and Eileen, both married sons of John Ogilvie, brother of William Watson Ogilvie and one of the founders of Ogilvie Mills. Gladys married Capt.(later Brig. Gen.) Alexander Thomas Ogilvie, and Eileen married realtor Douglas Watson Ogilvie. Dorothy White married Montreal lawyer, John Wilson Cook.
- Margaret Macfie Allan (1858–1939), married veterinarian Dr. Charles McEachran (1864–1919) of Montreal.
- Sir Montagu Allan (1860–1951), vice-chairman of the Allan Line, President of the Merchants Bank. Principal heir of his father, he inherited Ravenscrag and married, in 1893, Marguerite Ethel Mackenzie. Their four children, including Martha Allan, predeceased them.
- Bryce James Allan (1862–1924), managed the Allan Line from Boston. He was educated at Bishop's College School and in France and Germany. He lived at "Allanbank" near Boston (now known as Tupper Manor and part of Endicott College). In 1896, he married Anna, daughter of General Francis Winthrop Palfrey of Boston.
- Edythe Maud Allan (1863–1946), married (James) Turner Routledge (d. 1899). They purchased one of her father's farms, "Belmere" in Georgeville, Quebec, and were the parents of two sons, Lieut. Allan (d. 1916) and Maj. James Colin (d. 1977).
- Mabel Gertrude Allan (1867–1955), married Colin Augustus Monk Campbell (1860–1926), Seigneur de Rouville. He was the son of Major Thomas Edmund Campbell and Henriette-Julie, daughter of Captain Michel-Louis Juchereau Duchesnay. They lived at Manoir Rouville-Campbell in St. Hilaire, Quebec. Two children survived infancy: Enid Margaret (Mrs. Joseph C. Wray), and Phoebe Duchesnay.
- Arthur Edward Allan (1871–1893), died young in an accidental fire.

== Final years ==
In 1871, Allan was created a Knight Bachelor by Queen Victoria for his services in connection with the development of ocean steam navigation in Canada. In December 1882, not long after the death of his wife, he died in Edinburgh while visiting his son-in-law, Sir George Houstoun-Boswall.

At his death, he was one of the richest men in the world, with a fortune estimated to be between £8 million and £12 million pounds. His remains were brought back to Montreal, and he was buried with his family at the Mount Royal Cemetery. The Allan family's Canadian enterprises, almost entirely built by Hugh, were continued by his brother, Andrew Allan.

== See also ==
- Golden Square Mile
- History of Montreal
- Lower Canada
- Scots-Quebecers

== Bibliography ==
- Biography of Hugh Allan
