= Andrew Allan (shipowner) =

Canadian businessman and financier (1822–1901)

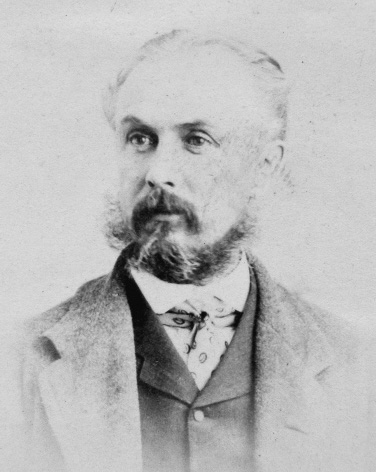
- Born: 1 December 1822; Saltcoats, Scotland
- Died: 27 June 1901 (aged 78); Montreal, Quebec
- Known for: Successor to his brother Sir Hugh Allan as President of the Allan Line and the Merchant's Bank of Canada etc.

Andrew Allan (1 December 1822 – 27 June 1901) was a Scottish-born Canadian businessman and financier. In 1882, he succeeded his brother, Sir Hugh Allan, of Ravenscrag, in the Allan family's Canadian enterprises that were centred on the Allan Line Royal Mail Steamers, but also included banking and railways. He was Master of Foxhounds for the Montreal Hunt.

== Early life ==
Born in 1822 at Saltcoats, Ayrshire, Andrew Allan was the fourth son of Captain Alexander Allan and his wife Jean Crawford (1782–1856). He was a first cousin of Sir Alexander Tilloch Galt and his father was a first cousin of the Scottish bard, Robert Burns. In 1819, Allan's father established the Allan Shipping Line, which became synonymous with running goods and passengers between Scotland and Montreal. After a parish education at Greenock, Andrew was brought into the family shipping business, then known as J & A Allan, of Glasgow. Of his four brothers, at this time James was running the Glasgow office, helped by Alexander; Bryce, was in charge of the Liverpool office, while Hugh was expanding the family's interests in Montreal. With the rapid growth of the business in Montreal, it was decided that Andrew would be best placed there.

== Shipping ==
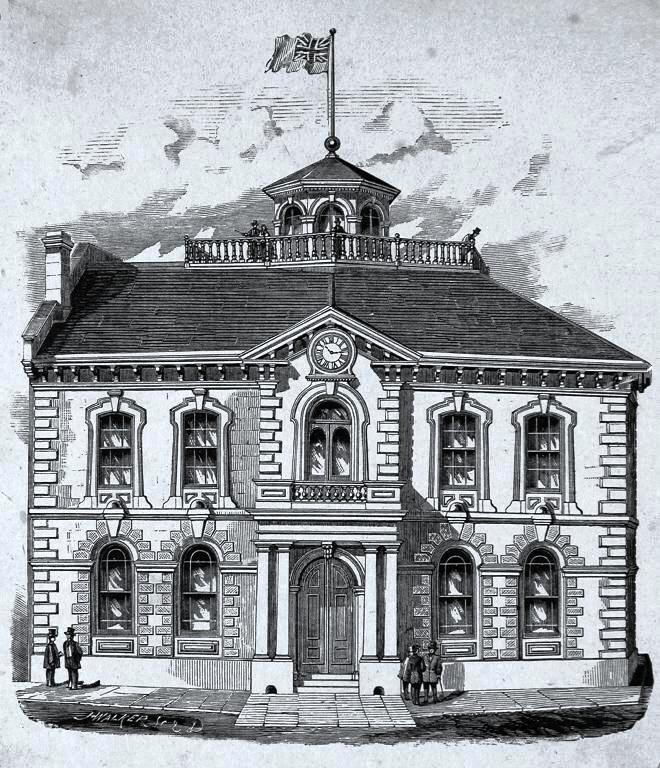
Offices of H & A Allan, Montreal, 1863

As a clerk, Andrew joined the newly organised shipping firm of Edmonstone, Allan & Co., of which his brother, Hugh, was partner. By 1846, Andrew had also become a partner and from 1863 the firm was known as the H & A Allan, of Montreal. Andrew worked closely with his brother in forming the Montreal Ocean Steamship Company, incorporated in 1854. By 1857, the Allan family were the sole owners, whose chief advantage over their competition was the use of iron-hulled steamships with screw propellers. The company won government mail contracts and was subsidised for the number of immigrants it brought from Britain to Canada.

There was never any doubt that Hugh Allan was the driving force behind what became Canada's leading steamship company, and the multitude of his other business interests. For the most part, Andrew remained comfortably under his brother's wing. In 1870, he wrote "every year I have even more reason to wonder at, and admire his (Hugh's) business capabilities."

When Hugh died in 1882, Andrew took his place as head of the Allan family's Canadian enterprises, presiding over the peak of the shipping firm's worldwide cargo and passenger activities in the 1880s and 1890s. Andrew had kept things as they were under his brother, but by 1897 it was necessary to make some major changes, in part to raise additional capital for a new fleet of ships. He presided over the dissolution of the family partnership and the creation of a steamship company with limited liability, taking the post of chairman in the Allan Line Steamship Company Limited, based in Glasgow. Andrew tirelessly represented the Allan family's shipping interests wherever they were needed. From 1873 until his death he was an influential member of the Montreal Harbour Commission and for several years he served as its chairman.

== Banking ==
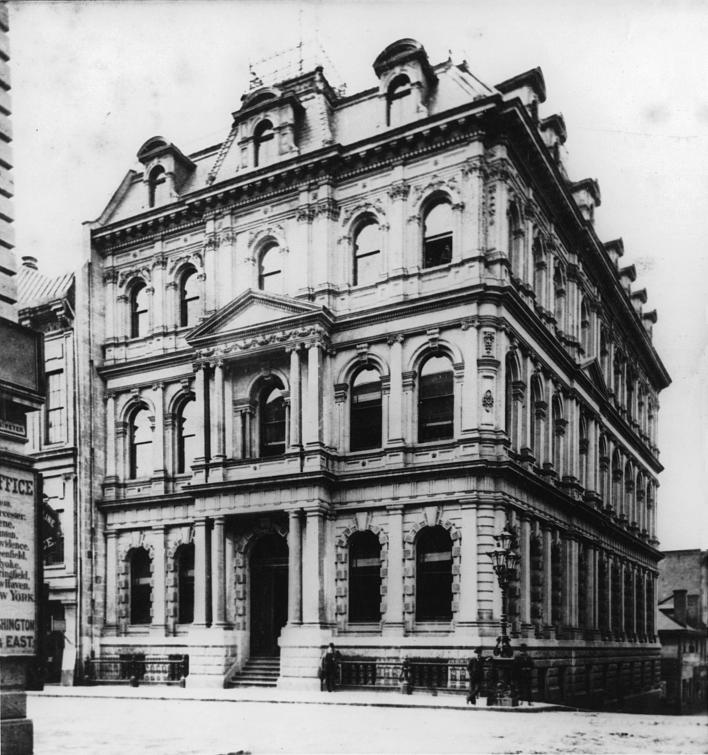
The Allan's Merchants Bank Building on St. James Street, Montreal. 1870

In 1861, Andrew and Hugh Allan founded the Merchant's Bank of Canada which became an important part of the Allan family's financial empire. The bank had grown with particular success in Ontario and the Canadian West to become one of Canadas most important financial institutions. In addition to being an important shareholder, Andrew was a director from its start in 1861, to 1883 when he became its president, a position he held until his death. As president, he continued the bank's policy of western expansion, seeing the bank's assets grow by one-third but its net profits falling.

Since its creation, the bank had been used by the Allan family, including Andrew, to finance their personal investments, particularly in Manitoba and towards the North Western Railway. The loans taken out by the Allans were almost always outstanding, which stunted a greater percentage of its investments going into more secure bonds.

== Railways ==
Andrew had enjoyed relative success in shipping and banking, but his involvement with the Manitoba and North Western Railway Company of Canada was a failure. The Allan family had invested heavily in the venture and Andrew, connected with the railway since 1883, was its president by 1892. Despite expansive and enthusiastic lobbying, by 1894 the Allans could not afford the interest payments on its debt and the company was put into receivership. A dispute quickly arose between the railway's bondholders and the Allan family over control of the company's assets. The fact that Andrew took little direct part in the negotiations perhaps indicated the rise of younger family members within the Allan hierarchy. In 1898, after extensive litigation, administration of the company's assets passed to a receiver representing the bondholders. Andrew's nephew, H. Montagu Allan managed to pass the lease of the railway line from Portage la Prairie to Yorkton to the Canadian Pacific Railway in 1900.

== Further business interests ==
Andrew Allan was president of several manufacturing enterprises, including the Montreal Rolling Mills Company; Cornwall Woollen Manufacturing; Dominion Oil Cloth; Canadian Rubber Company; Windsor Hotel of Montreal and the Montreal Lumber Company. In 1883, he co-founded the Citizens Gas Company of Montreal in an unsuccessful attempt to challenge the Montreal Gas Company. Among others, he was a director of Confederation Life and the Montreal Telegraph Company, succeeding his brother Hugh as president of the latter in 1882.

== Private life ==
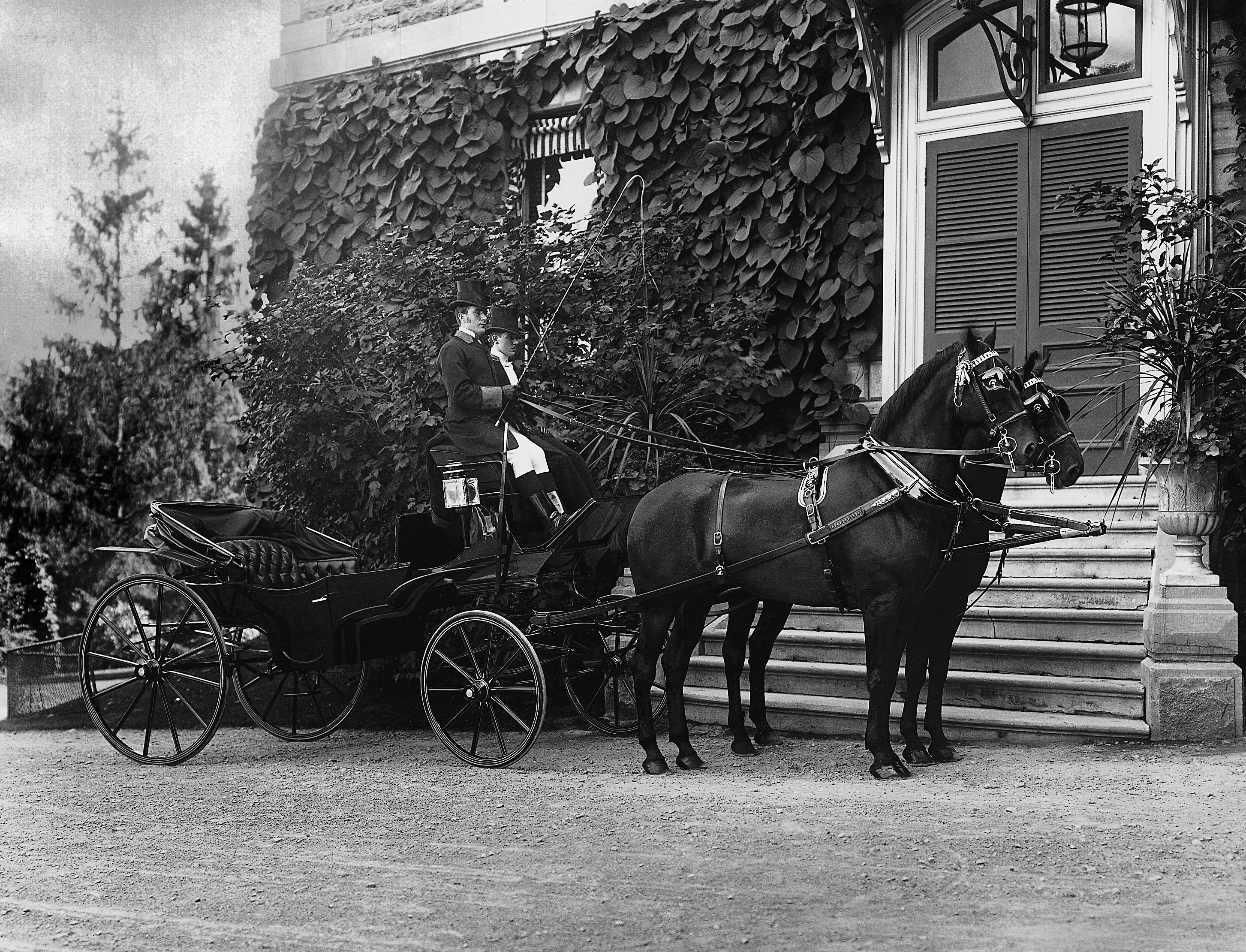
Carriage at Andrew Allan's, Montreal 1901

Andrew Allan was chairman of St. Paul's Church from 1872 to 1901, which under him and through his own significant financial donations became the wealthiest Presbyterian church in Canada. He was a life member of the St Andrew's Society of Montreal and served as an officer in the Royal Light Infantry of Montreal. From 1862 until his death he was president of the Montreal Sailors Institute, established to promote sobriety and morality among seamen ashore. Apart from the funds collected by ships officers from their crews, (including those of the Allan Line) the institute's main source of revenue was the Allan family. His other philanthropic interests included the Montreal Protestant House of Industry and Refuge, of which he was made a life governor in 1863. He was Master of the Montreal Hunt from the 1870s, and like other members of his family he took a great interest in floriculture and horses.

In comparison to his brother Hugh Allan, Andrew's business ability is often overlooked. While he lacked his brother's entrepreneurial flair and despite his failure with the railway in the Canadian West, he nonetheless steered the Allan Line through the height of its success, and when needed, stepped up to re-organize the family firm ready for his many sons and nephews on both sides of the Atlantic Ocean to take them into the 20th century. He is buried with his family at Mount Royal Cemetery, Montreal.

== Family ==
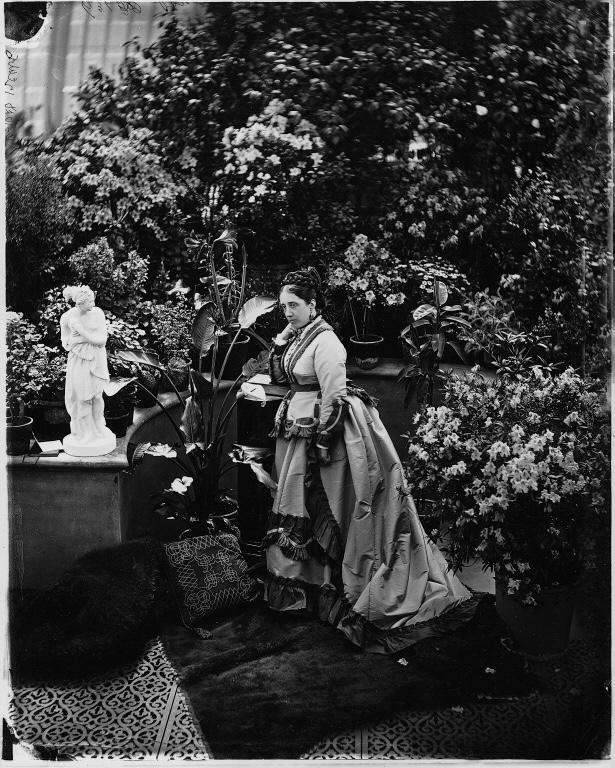
Mrs Allan in their conservatory, 1871

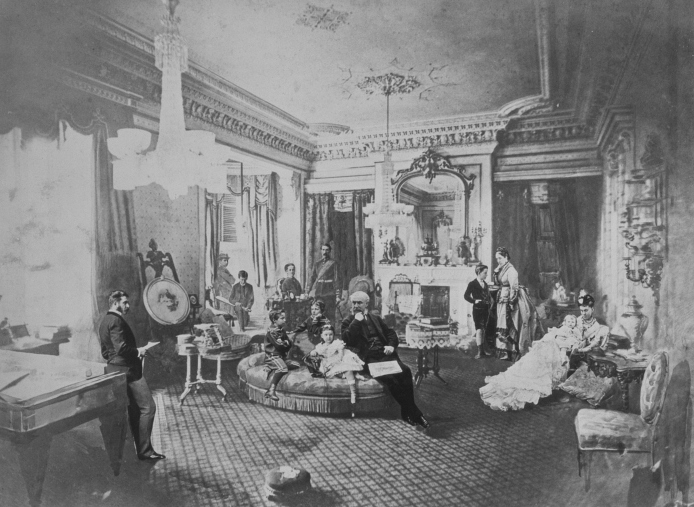
The Allan family at home in Montreal, 1871

In 1848, Andrew Allan married Isabella Ann Smith, one of the four daughters of John Smith (d.1872) of Athelstane Hall, Montreal, and his wife Betsy Rea. John Smith was a native of Athelstaneford and became one of Montreal's leading dry goods merchants. Isabella's eldest sister, Caroline, had married Andrew's brother Hugh in 1844. Mrs Allan's sister, Elizabeth, married Hartland St. Clair MacDougall (brother of George Campbell MacDougall) and the last remaining sister married James St. George Bellhouse, of the firm Bellhouse & Dillon. The Allans home, Iononteh, was a greystone mansion that dominated Upper Peel Street in the Golden Square Mile, near to Andrew's brother's house, Ravenscrag. Designed by John William Hopkins, it was built in 1865 and enlarged in 1873. Andrew Allan also owned a farm near Lachine, Quebec. Andrew and Isabella were the parents of eight children,

- Bessie Rae Allan (born 1848). In 1868, she married Captain William Henry Benyon (1842–1912), of the 23rd Royal Welsh Fusiliers, son of Thomas Benyon of New Grange Hall, Leeds
- Nina (Jean Crawford) Allan (1851–1922). She married William Mackenzie, of Montreal, and had four children with him, including Isabel, later Mrs Alex Paterson. In 1876, while still married to Mr Mackenzie, she eloped to the United States with Frederick Henderson Brydges (1852–1928), son of Charles John Brydges. In 1877, she divorced her first husband and married Mr Brydges in Boston, moving with him to Winnipeg.
- John Smith Allan, of Montreal. He married Adelaide Stuart Gault (1857–1937), daughter of The Hon. Matthew Hamilton Gault of Montreal and Elizabeth Bourne. Mrs Allan was a first cousin of Andrew Hamilton Gault who raised Princess Patricia's Canadian Light Infantry. John and Adelaide were the parents of six children, including Lady Marler. In 1892, like his sister Nina, Jack Allan eloped to San Francisco with Mrs Edith Montagu Hebden.
- Hugh Andrew Allan (1857–1938), in charge of the Allan Line at Boston (1887–1892) and chairman at London (1909–1917). He married Margaret Rae, daughter of William Rae, merchant, ship-owner and agent to the Allan Line at Quebec. Their only child, (Margaret) Rachel, married Maj. George Bevil Hastings Wheler MC, of Otterden Place, Kent.
- Andrew Alexander Allan (1860–1919), was vice-president of the Allan Line at Montreal. He was the father of Doris, wife of Russell Cowans of Montreal.
- James Bryce Allan (1861–1945) K.C. Educated at Rugby School, University of Oxford and Laval University. He became a lawyer and senior partner in the prominent Montreal firm of Campbell, Meredith & Allan, who represented the Allan family businesses. He died unmarried in England.
- William Rae Allan (1864–1926), shipping agent to the Allan Line at Winnipeg.
- Isabel Brenda Allan (1867–1959). In 1888, she married Sir Vincent Meredith. No children.
