= Alexander Allan (ship owner) =

Scottish sea captain (1780–1854)

Captain Alexander Allan
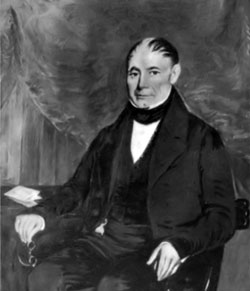
- Portrait of Captain Allan
- Born: 26 February 1780; Dundonald, South Ayrshire, Scotland, Kingdom of Great Britain
- Died: 18 March 1854 (aged 74); Glasgow, Scotland, United Kingdom
- Resting place: Glasgow Necropolis, Scotland
- Other name: Sandy
- Occupations: Merchant seaman; Shipowner
- Known for: Founding the Allan Royal Mail Line
- Spouse: Jean Crawford (m. 1806)
- Children: 8, including Hugh and Andrew
- Relatives: Agnes Burns (maternal aunt); Robert Burns (first cousin); H. Montagu Allan (grandson); Martha Allan (great-granddaughter)

Captain Alexander "Sandy" Allan (26 February 1780 – 18 March 1854) was a Scottish sea captain and shipowner who founded the Allan Line in 1819. Rising from shoemaker to shipping magnate in little more than thirty years, Allan retired in 1839 having made a fortune and created a transatlantic dynasty which lasted until 1918.

He is recognised as one of the major contributors to Scotland's commercial interests in the early 19th century, and to the establishment of the Firth of Clyde as an international centre of shipping. During the Napoleonic Wars his brig Jean – so named for his wife – held the record for the fastest crossing between the Firth of Clyde and Quebec City. Under his five sons, the Allan Line became the world's largest privately owned shipping empire.

== Early life ==
Sandy Allan was born at Fairlie Estate, Dundonald, South Ayrshire, the third son of James Allan – a cheerful and well-respected carpenter on the Fairlie House estate – and his wife Jean Brown (1750–1821), daughter of Gilbert Brown (1708–1774). His mother was the younger sister of Agnes (Brown) Burns, the mother of Sandy's famous first cousin, the Scottish bard, Robert Burns, whose family also worked on the Fairlie estate. In the summer of 1786, Robert Burns stayed with the Allans at their cottage while avoiding a writ from James Armour in consequence of his relationship with Jean Armour.

Allan had expected to become a carpenter, but after his father's death when he was twelve, he was apprenticed to a shoemaker in Kilmarnock, working ten hours a day, except on Sundays. By 1800, when he was employed as a journeyman shoemaker near Galston, Sandy quit and moved to Saltcoats, intent on learning to be a ship's carpenter. He gave that idea up almost immediately for the chance to go to sea and was soon sailing as mate to Captain John Wilson of Saltcoats. Within a few years, Allan had served as Master and part-owner of several first-class ships trading out of Saltcoats. In 1806, at Saltcoats, he married Jean Crawford (1782–1856), whose family lived in a small cottage in Castleweerock.

During the Peninsular War, Captain Allan was master of the 175 ton brigantine Hero. It was chartered by the British government to transport troops, cattle and goods to Spain to supply Wellington's army. Vessels such as his were usually put under the protection of an armed convoy to ensure their safety, but Captain Allan grew impatient with the delay that these escorts added to his voyages. It was his practice to separate himself from the protecting warships and pursue his voyages unaccompanied, therefore making the journey in as short a time as possible. Those vessels which remained under convoy were always held up by the slowest in the group. His trips to Spain, although somewhat hazardous, were successful, and by 1814, Captain Allan had established a reputation for himself as both an excellent mariner and a shrewd businessman.

== Trading with Canada ==
Since taking command of the Jean, every spring and fall, Allan took his brig from Greenock to Montreal and back again. The produce that he exported belonged to dry goods merchants, many of whom had houses on both sides of the Atlantic. It was Allan's responsibility as captain of the ship to both navigate across the ocean and sell the cargo on arrival, before purchasing Canadian supplies to be sold back to dry goods merchants in Scotland. On the outward journey his ship was filled with coal, iron, herrings, sugar and West Indian spices. On the return journey he took back wheat, peas, flour, pot ashes and most importantly, timber.

Captain Allan soon gained a reputation as an adept trader, and he was frequently known to have sold his entire cargo within a few hours of his arrival in Greenock from Montreal. During the Napoleonic Wars, the Jean also held the record for the fastest crossing between the Firth of Clyde and Quebec City. During this period trade with Canada was still in its infancy, but the route which Allan pioneered between Greenock and Montreal would soon become synonymous with the Allan Line, only on a far greater scale. By 1819, Allan had bought out his co-owners and the Allan Line, which then consisted of himself and the Jean, was born.

Although Glasgow furnished most of Allan's outward cargoes, the goods were transferred from there to Greenock, which was the port of loading and discharge for Canadian traders. So as to be better able to conduct his shipping business, Captain Allan moved his family from Saltcoats to Greenock in 1824.

== Expansion of the Allan Line ==
In the winter of 1824, Captain Allan had the brig Favorite built in Montreal, though the materials used to construct it had been sent out from Scotland. The ship turned out to be appropriately named as it was much in demand as a safe and speedy conveyance, both of goods and passengers. It was in the Favourite that Captain Allan's first and third sons (James and Bryce) received their nautical training.

In 1830, the 329 ton ship Canada was built for Captain Allan by Robert Steel & Co., of Greenock. The launch of this 'monster vessel', as she was then regarded, was one of the notable events of the time. Crowds turned out to see her, and her arrival in Montreal produced quite a sensation there. Captain Allan himself commanded the Canada while his son James succeeded him in the command of the Favorite.

The superiority of the British-built ship over that of the colonial led Captain Allan to contract with Robert Steel & Co. for another ship, the barque Arabian. This vessel was built in 1837, and Captain Allan's eldest son, James, was promoted to her command. The ownership of these latter vessels was almost exclusively confined to the Allan family as their need for investors became less necessary. The first voyage of the Arabian was made from Greenock to Canada in June 1837, and on her return to the Firth of Clyde she proceeded to Glasgow, which was now possible as a result of the recently undertaken dredging operations. The Canada, which was a deeper drafted vessel than the Arabian, was not permitted to ascend the river until the following year, 1838. From this period onwards the terminal port of the inward Clyde-bound ships with general cargo and their outward loading port was Glasgow, and as such Captain Allan and his family made their new home there.

== Captain Allan's Sons ==
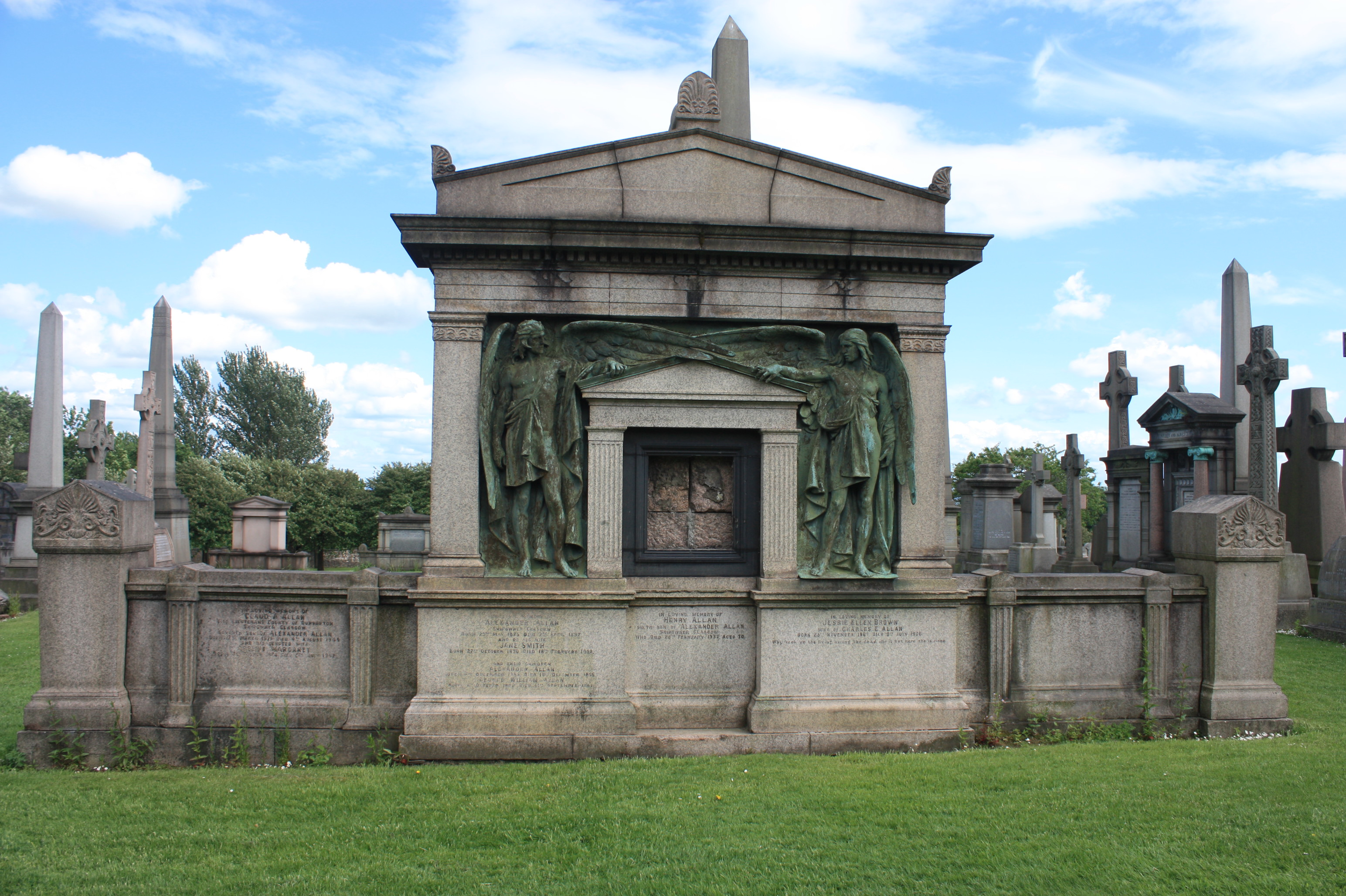
The grave of Alexander and Hugh Allan, shipbuilders, Glasgow Necropolis

Vessel after vessel was added to the Allan fleet, and soon Captain Allan's eldest son, James (1808–1880), retired from the sea to conduct the business of their now extensive shipping line, at Glasgow. The youngest of Captain Allan's five sons, Alexander (1825–1892), though still at a young age, joined James in the management of the Glasgow business.

The second son, Hugh (1810–1882), had at an early age been settled by his father in Montreal at the office of their shipping agents, where the fourth son, Andrew (1822–1901), would later follow him. Hugh possessed in a high degree the energy of his father, and in Montreal he speedily came to the front, becoming, while yet still young, a partner, and ultimately the head of the firm.

The increase of their fleets enabled the Allans to establish a branch of their service at Liverpool and a continued presence in the agency was needed there. The third son, Bryce (1814–1874), who had been in command of one of the ships, withdrew from the sea and took charge of the Liverpool branch.

== Legacy ==
With his five sons settled at the terminal ports of their vessels, Captain Sandy Allan retired from active duty in 1839, but still took an active interest in the company. The principal direction of the affairs of the Allan Line now rested with the eldest son, James, later to be overtaken by Hugh.

Captain Allan died 18 March 1854, aged 74. In his progress from shoemaker to seaman, ship's mate to shipping magnate, he had made his fortune and established a dynasty. At the same time, he had done a great deal for Scotland's commercial interests and for the Clyde as a shipping centre. He did live to see the initial step which ended in the substitution of steamships for sailing ships in the Allan's Canadian trade, but it needed the courage and skill of the second generation to effect the change. When the proposition was first made, the old captain gravely shook his head and warned his sons to take care.

In 1854, the first Allan steamship, the Canadian was launched at Dumbarton. This was speedily followed by three others, also constructed by Dennys of Dumbarton – the Indian, Anglo-Saxon and North American. The two first-named steamers were profitably employed by the British government during the Crimean War. In peace, they settled down to the trade for which they were built, the Canadian mail service, the first of the Allan Line Royal Mail Steamers. The service, subsidised by the Government of Canada, was at first fortnightly in summer and monthly in winter before becoming weekly all the year round five years later.
