= Charles John Brydges =

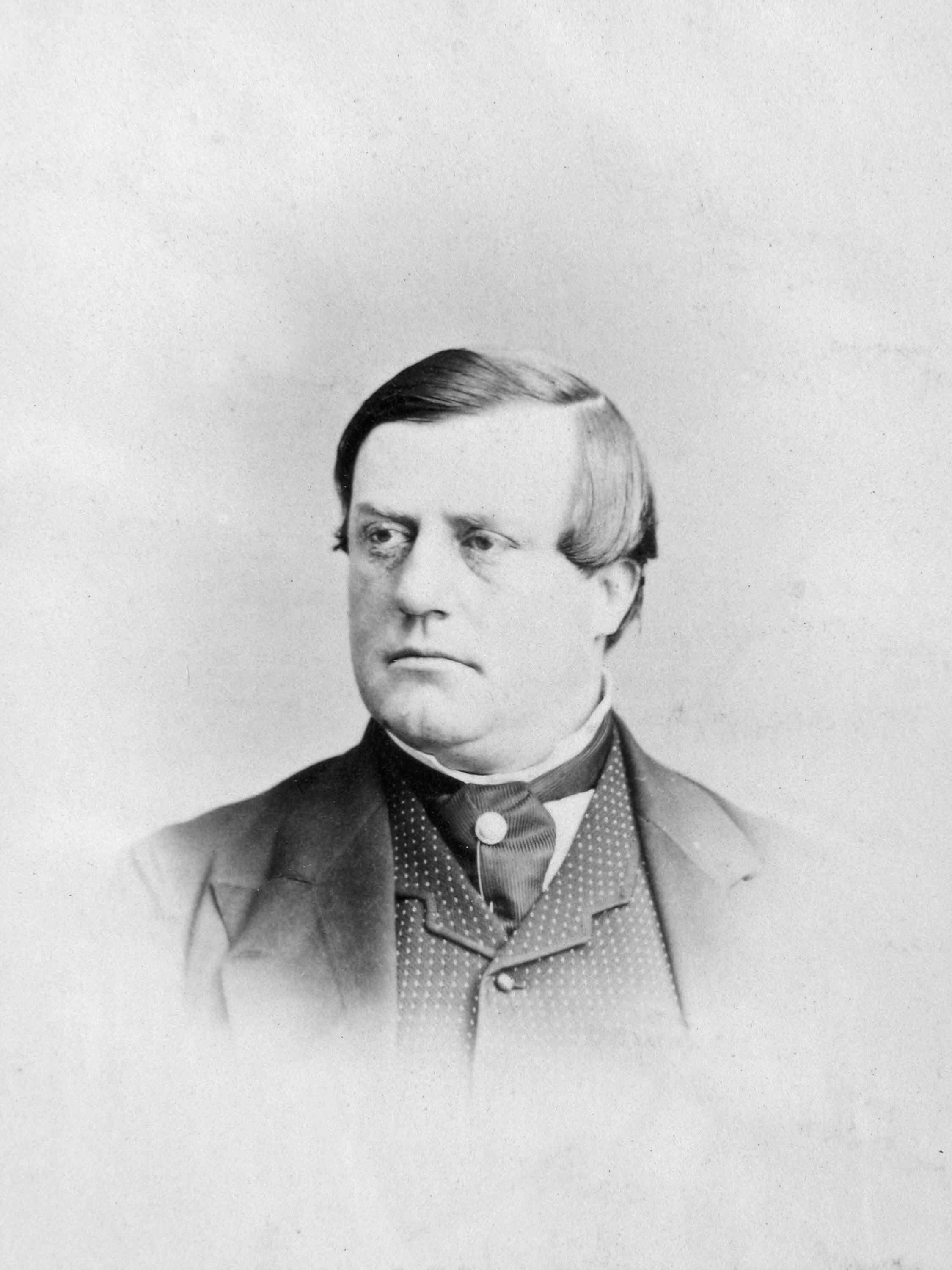
- Born: 23 February 1827
- Died: 16 February 1889 (aged 61)

Charles John Brydges (23 February 1827 in London, England – 16 February 1889 in Winnipeg) was the son of Thomas and Mary Brydges. He was baptized on 30 May 1827 at Saint Leonards, Shoreditch, London, England. As a young man he learned railway management with the London and South Western Railway. In 1852 he came to British North America to become the managing director of the Great Western Railroad which was incorporated to build a line from Burlington Bay to Lake Huron. From 1862 to 1874 he was general manager of the competing Grand Trunk Railway. Afterwards he became one of the Commissioners of the Intercolonial Railway which connected Montreal, Quebec, with Halifax, Nova Scotia. From 1879 until his death he was a Land Commissioner for the Hudson's Bay Company in Winnipeg.

The town Mount Brydges, Ontario, is named in his honour.
