= John Hilton =

John Hilton or Jack Hilton may refer to:

== John Hilton ==
- John Buxton Hilton (1921–1986), British crime writer
- John Hilton (American football) (1942–2017), American football tight end
- John Hilton the elder (1565–1609), British composer
- John Hilton the younger (c. 1599–1657), British composer, son of the above
- John Hilton (industrial relations) (1880–1943), British professor of industrial relations
- John Hilton (manufacturer) (c. 1791–1866), Canadian businessperson
- John Hilton (surgeon) (1805–1878), British surgeon
- John Hilton (table tennis) (born 1947), retired British table tennis player
- John Hilton (cricketer, born 1792) (1792–?), English cricketer
- John Hilton (cricketer, born 1838) (1838–1910), English cricketer.
- John T. Hilton (1801–1864), African-American abolitionist and businessman
- John Hilton Grace (1873–1958), British mathematician
- John Hilton (soccer) (born 2001), American soccer player

== Jack Hilton ==
- Jack Hilton (1921–1998), rugby league footballer of the 1940s and 1950s for Great Britain, England, and Wigan
- Jack Hilton (author) (1900–1983), British novelist, essayist, and travel writer
- Jack Hilton (footballer) (1925–2007), English footballer who made appearances in the English Football League with Wrexham

== See also ==
- Jack Hylton (1892–1965), British band leader and impresario
- John Hylton, de jure 18th Baron Hylton (1699–1746), English politician
