= J. & W. Hilton =

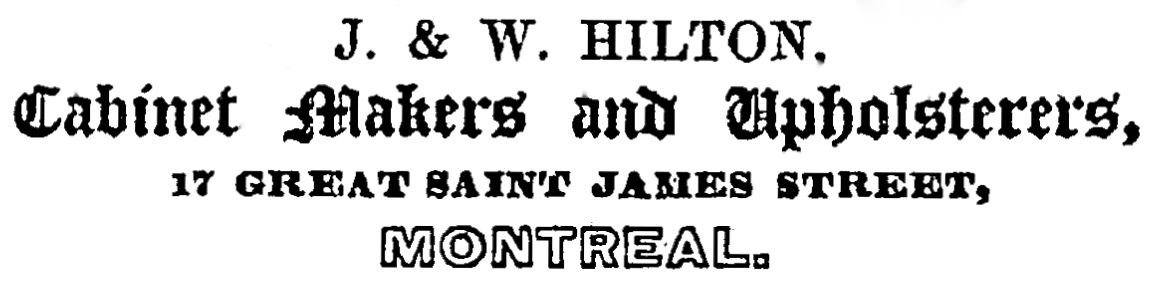
- Type: Cabinetmaking
- Industry: Furniture & Interior design
- Predecessor: Hilton & Baird 1823-1844
- Founded: 1820 in Montreal, Canada
- Founder: John Hilton
- Defunct: 1875
- Fate: Bankrupted
- Headquarters: Montreal, Canada
- Number of employees: 82 (1856)

J. & W. Hilton is a cabinetmaking and interior design company founded in Montreal, Canada, in 1820 by cabinetmaker John Hilton, who went into partnership with his son William in 1845.

In 1820, cabinetmaker John Hilton founded his own furniture manufacturing business in Montreal. Around 1823, he partnered with James Baird to create Hilton & Baird. In 1833, Edmond Baird replaced James Baird as a partner. This partnership was dissolved in 1844. In 1845, John Hilton partnered with his son William, creating the J. & W. Hilton Company. After John Hilton's death in 1866, his sons William and Edward continued the business. However, financial difficulties combined with an economic crisis forced the company to declare bankruptcy in 1872, and the company was liquidated later that year. William Hilton, however, continued to operate as a furniture dealer under the name "J. & W. Hilton" until he himself declared bankruptcy in 1875.

This company "was one of the most prestigious furniture businesses in the country." In 1871, its production value placed it second among the largest furniture manufacturers in Quebec, behind the firm of cabinetmaker William Drum of Quebec City. Its reputation and the quality of its furniture earned it the privilege to represent Canada at the 1851 World's Fair in London, United Kingdom, and then at the 1855 World's Fair in Paris, France.

== History ==
=== 1820 to 1844: Hilton & Baird ===
Little information exists about the creation of John Hilton's furniture manufacturing business. In 1820, he founded his own furniture manufacturing business in Montreal, Canada. Around 1823, he entered into partnership with James Baird, probably to increase the company's capital and thus acquire additional tools for furniture manufacturing. By 1825, they had a shop southwest of Place d'Armes in Montreal, selling complete sets of household furniture (sofas, dining room tables and chairs, sideboards, bookcases, card tables, chests of drawers, beds, mattresses, etc.), various work tools or furniture for businesses, and even coffins. In 1833, Edmond Baird replaced James Baird as a partner. In 1840, the company purchased six lots of land located on Saint-Alexandre Street in Montreal, including "a house and other buildings," and established its furniture manufacturing plant there. On October 7, 1842, a fire broke out in the factory, destroying it and an entire block of buildings between Saint-Alexandre, Craig, Chenneville, and Côté Streets. On February 4, 1843, their shop on Place d'Armes caught fire. All the furniture on display was destroyed by the flames. In 1844, John Hilton and Edmond Baird dissolved their partnership. The latter died on February 22, 1859, at the age of 56 years and 7 months.

=== 1845 to 1875: J. & W. Hilton ===
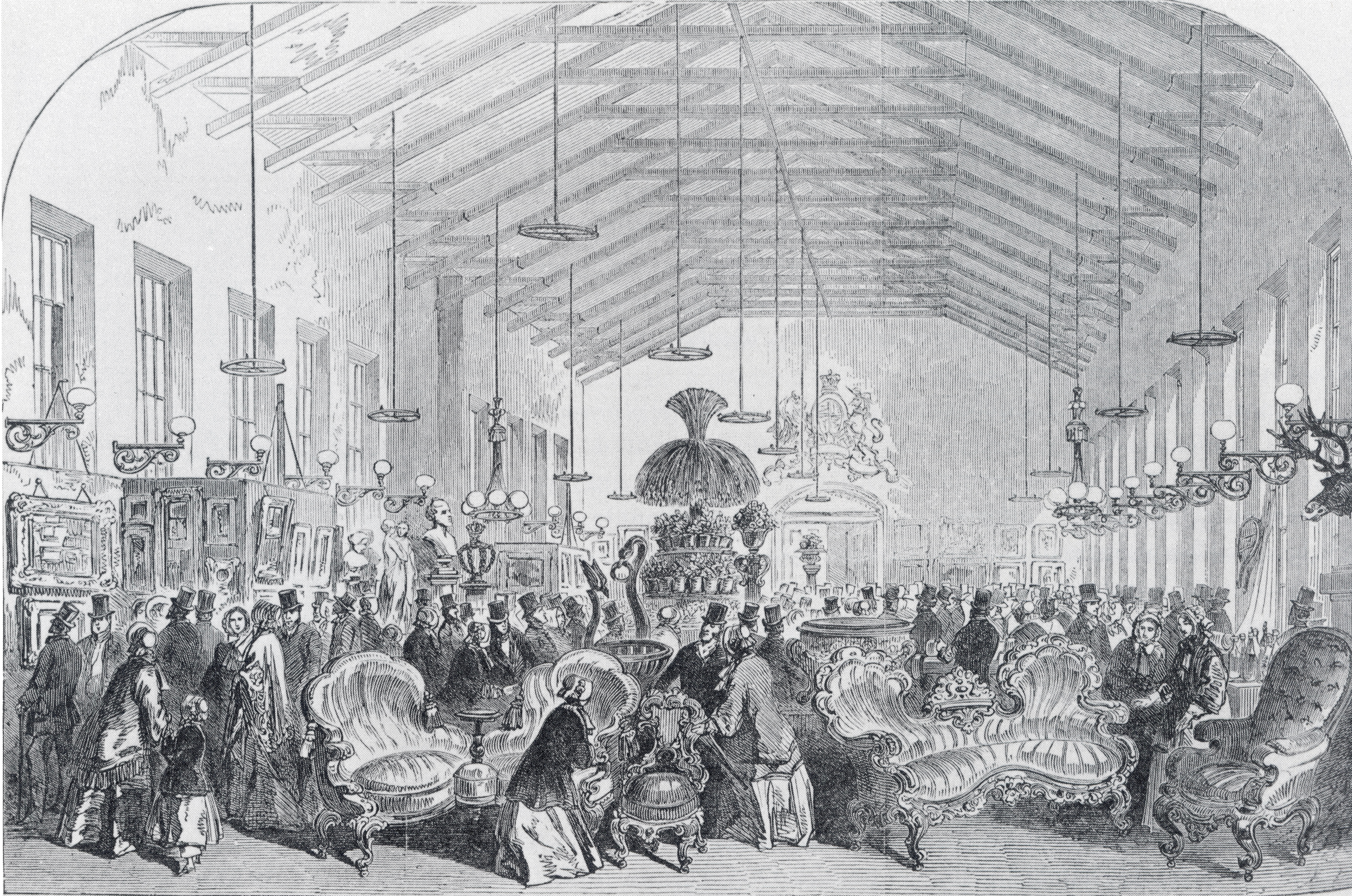
The 1850 Provincial Exhibition at the Bonsecours Market in Montreal. This engraving shows the furniture of J. & W. Hilton in the foreground.

Around 1845, John Hilton partnered with his own son, William Hilton, to found "J. & W. Hilton". They then opened a new store on Grand St. James Street while setting up their new factory on Germans Street. Between November 1849 and May 1850, the company modernized, notably by acquiring steam engines, which they installed at their factory on Germans Street to increase their production capacity.

In 1850, in anticipation of the 1851 London's Great Exhibition, a provincial exhibition of Canadian industry was held. Companies were invited to showcase their products and compete to represent Canada at the following year's London Exhibition. J. & W. Hilton participated and won several prizes, earning them a place in the Exhibition. (Note: Porter 1993, p. 376)

In 1851, J. & W. Hilton was one of the companies chosen to represent Canada at the Great Exhibition in London, United Kingdom. (Note: Virtue 1851, p. 119) "Hilton's furniture is much admired for both its wood and its workmanship," wrote the periodical Le Canadien on May 21, 1851. Queen Victoria herself had the opportunity to appreciate Hilton's furniture during her visit to the exhibition on May 7, 1851.

Furniture by J. & W. Hilton presented at the Great Exhibition in London in 1851

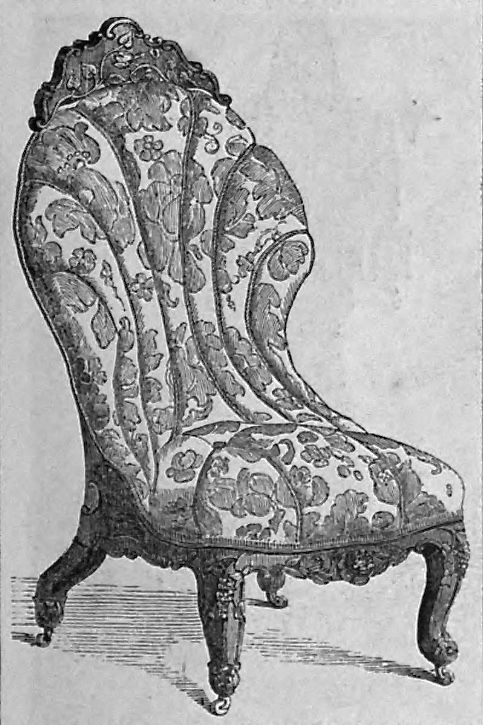
Chair carved in black walnut and covered in crimson and gold damask by J. & W. Hilton

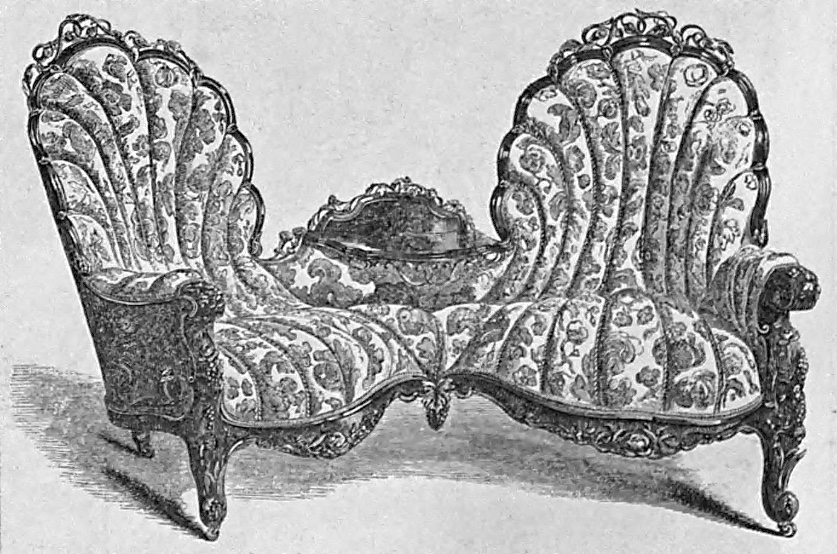
Confidant or tête-à-tête carved in black walnut and covered in crimson and gold damask by J. & W. Hilton

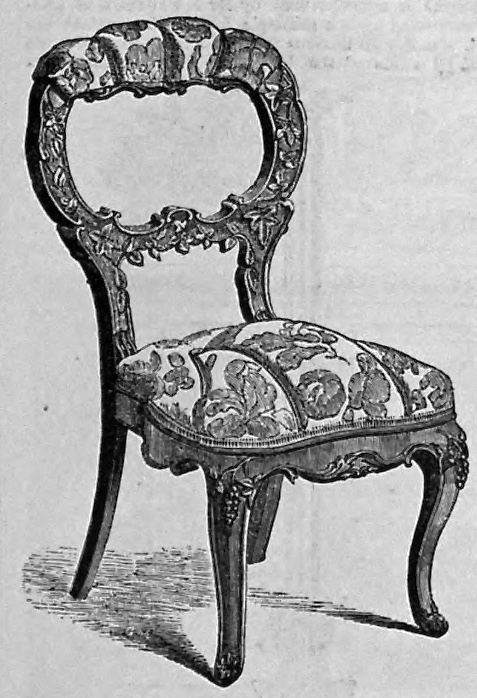
Chair carved in black walnut and covered in crimson and gold damask by J. & W. Hilton

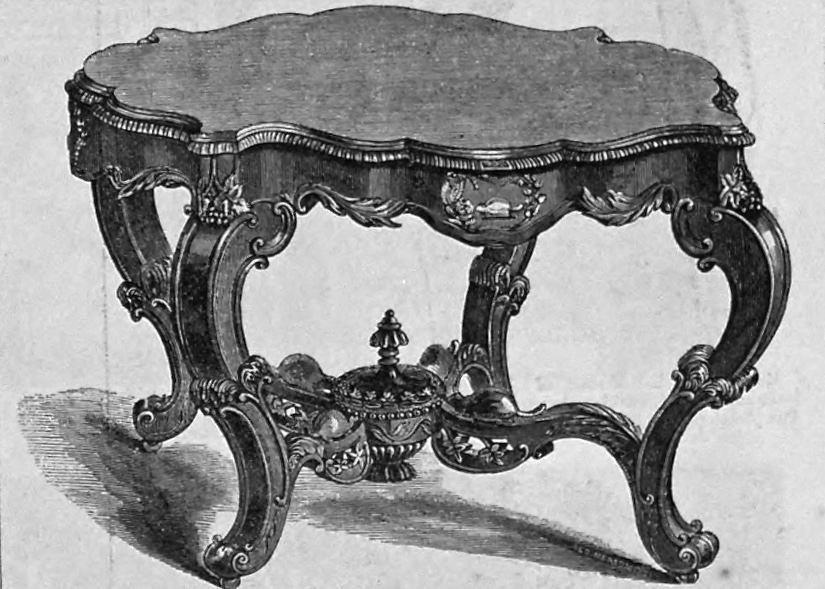
Table carved in black walnut. The legs are scrolled, the top is irregular and carved with foliage, and the stretchers join a pseudo-classical urn by J. & W. Hilton.

Around 1854, the company moved its factory to Saint-Germain Street, near the Saint-Gabriel Locks of the Lachine Canal, where "modern machinery powered by hydraulic power" allowed for "rapid expansion." (Note: Porter 1993, p. 270)

In 1855, J. & W. Hilton was once again one of the companies chosen to represent Canada at the Paris World's Fair, where it presented several pieces of furniture, including "a sofa with an elastic back, a round walnut table, a walnut console table, a chair with an elastic back for sewing, six parlor chairs, and a tête-à-tête." (Note: Rapport préliminaire 1855, p. 17) At this event, it won a second-class medal for one of its pieces of furniture.

By 1856, the company had accumulated capital of £15,000 and owned a brick factory worth £3,000. It employed 82 people with a weekly payroll of £116. At that time, it produced between £20,000 and £30,000 worth of furniture annually, two-fifths of which was exported.

In 1863, the company acquired "new inventions" that allowed it to "sell furniture and picture moldings at extremely low prices." At that time, it was reportedly "the only factory where mirror glass is tinned." It employed 92 people.

In April 1867, journalists were invited to visit the company's factory located on Saint-Germain Street, near the Saint-Gabriel Locks of the Lachine Canal. The factory consisted of two four-story buildings: one measuring "200 feet by 40" while the other measured "160 feet by 40". In one of them, the first floor was used to receive the raw material to be divided into regular sizes using power saws. These pieces then went to the second floor to be subdivided in order to "prepare them to receive the shape" using more than 150 machines. These machines were powered by fifty horsepower hydraulic power. The other factory housed a mirror factory, "the only one in Lower Canada, we believe," wrote a journalist from La Minerve. A forge was also located on the site for machine repair work. At that time, more than 150 people were employed by the company, half of whom were "French Canadians".

In 1871, the company's production value placed it second among the largest furniture manufacturers in Quebec, behind the firm of cabinetmaker William Drum of Quebec City. (Note: Porter 1993, p. 320)

In 1872, financial difficulties combined with an economic crisis forced the company to declare bankruptcy. (Note: Porter 1993, p. 271) On January 4, 1872, the company requests protection from its creditors under the Insolvent Act of 1869. On March 14, 1872, it filed with the Superior Court "a consent of their creditors to their discharge." This was ratified by the Court on May 17, 1872. William Hilton, however, continued to operate under the name J. & W. Hilton as a furniture dealer until he himself declared bankruptcy in 1875.

== Hilton and the artists ==
Throughout his career, John Hilton surrounded himself with artists for the manufacture of furniture. His presence in Montreal's artistic community allowed him to select talented artists. For example, he was one of the founders of the Mechanics' Institute of Montreal in 1845, as well as one of the first members of the Art Association of Montreal in 1863.

Here is a non-exhaustive list of artists who worked for John Hilton:

- Azarie Lavigne, cabinetmaker and sculptor at J. & W. Hilton (1860s-1870s). (Note: Porter 1993, p. 272)
- John C. McLaren, cabinetmaker and superintendent at J. & W. Hilton (1860s).
- Arthur Mingeaud (from Paris), cabinetmaker and chief sculptor at J. & W. Hilton (1860s).
- James Morice, cabinetmaker, superintendent at Hilton & Baird (1840s).
- Frank Smith, cabinetmaker, superintendent at J. & W. Hilton (1860s-70s).
- Mr. Verole (from Paris), cabinetmaker, sculptor at J. & W. Hilton (1860s).
- Robert Williams, designer and upholsterer, head of the fabric department at J. & W. Hilton (From 1862 to 1872).

== Exhibitions and Awards ==
Below is a non-exhaustive list of exhibitions in which John Hilton's company has exhibited works:

Year	Exhibition	Date	Location	Furniture on display and awards (if applicable)
1850	Lower Canada Provincial Exhibition (Industrial Department)	October 17-19, 1850	(Canada) Montreal (Bonsecours Market)	Sculpted black walnut salon chair covered in crimson damask: 2nd prize; Sculpted black walnut tête-à-tête covered in crimson and gold damask: special prize; Carved black walnut table (no prize); Etc.
1851	1851's Great Exhibition in London (United Kingdom)	May 1 - October 15, 1851	London, United Kingdom	Black walnut Chairs covered in crimson damask; Black walnut Tête-à-tête covered in crimson and gold damask; Table carved in black walnut
1853	Lower Canada Provincial Exhibition (Industrial Department)	September 27-30, 1853	(Canada) Montreal (McTavish Estate)	Armchair by J. & W. Hilton: Special Price Recommended; Six Carved Oak Chairs by J. & W. Hilton: 1st Prize; Marble-Topped Table by J. & W. Hilton: 1st Prize; Elastic-Back Armchair by J. & W. Hilton: Special Price Recommended
1855	Exposition universelle of Paris (France)	May 15 - November 15, 1855	Paris, France	Elastic-back sofa; Round walnut table; Walnut console table; Elastic-back sewing chair; Six lounge chairs; and; Tête-à-tête · .
1857	Lower Canada Provincial Exhibition (Industrial Department)	September 16-18, 1857	(Canada) Montreal	Rosewood furniture set
1858	Lower Canada Provincial Exhibition (Industrial Department)	September 29 - October 1, 1858	(Canada) Montreal (Land of the Grand Trunk Railway Company, at Pointe-Saint-Charles)	Rosewood living room furniture
1860	Lower Canada Provincial Exhibition (Industrial Department) (Note: Porter 1993, p. 377)	August 25 - September 8, 1860	(Canada) Montreal (Crystal Palace)	Rosewood table with richly decorated glass legs (Note: Catalogue d'exposition 1860, p. 17)
1863	Lower Canada Provincial Exhibition (Industrial Department)	September 15-17, 1863	(Canada) Montreal (Crystal Palace)	Mahogany sideboard, 1st prize; Dining room table, 1st prize; Reclining chair, 1st prize; Secretary, 1st prize; A "furniture collection," 1st prize and diploma.
1865	Art Association Exhibition	February 27 - March (?), 1865	(Canada) Montreal (Mechanic's Hall)	Marquetry table; Marquetry chest of drawers; (Note: Art Association of Montreal 1865, p. 34); Hat rack (description: "The base is in the form of a chiffonier. In the middle of the door is a bundle of arms surmounted by laurels, a symbol of victory; on either side of the door are two fully armed ancient warriors; the top is of white marble, and above it rises a large mirror, the frame of which is decorated with carvings representing griffins and several other chimerical creations."); Several engravings by Arthur Mingeaud, chief sculptor at J. & W. Hilton; Table (description: "On the surface, which is of wavy square, are inlaid flowers formed from cut pieces of wood [...]; each shade is a separate piece. The top of this table is surrounded by a square of rosewood [...]. The legs, made of maple, are in imitation of rosewood, [and] gilded [...]")
1865	Lower Canada Provincial Exhibition (Industrial Department)	September 26-29, 1865	(Canada) Montreal (Crystal Palace)	Rosewood living room furniture set; Marquetry boudoir furniture set; Etc. (Note: Provincial Exhibition Catalogue 1865, p. 47)
1868	Lower Canada Provincial Exhibition (Industrial Department)	September 15-18, 1868	(Canada) Montreal (Crystal Palace)	Collection of furniture "modest, combining taste and comfort to a high degree but without luxury".
1870	Lower Canada Provincial Exhibition (Industrial Department)	September 13-16, 1870	(Canada) Montreal (Land of the Agricultural Council, Mile End)	Bedroom furniture sets: 1st class prize; Dining room furniture: 1st class prize; Oil-polished black walnut living room furniture: 1st class prize; Furniture "suitable for a Craftsman's home": 1st class prize.

== List of works ==
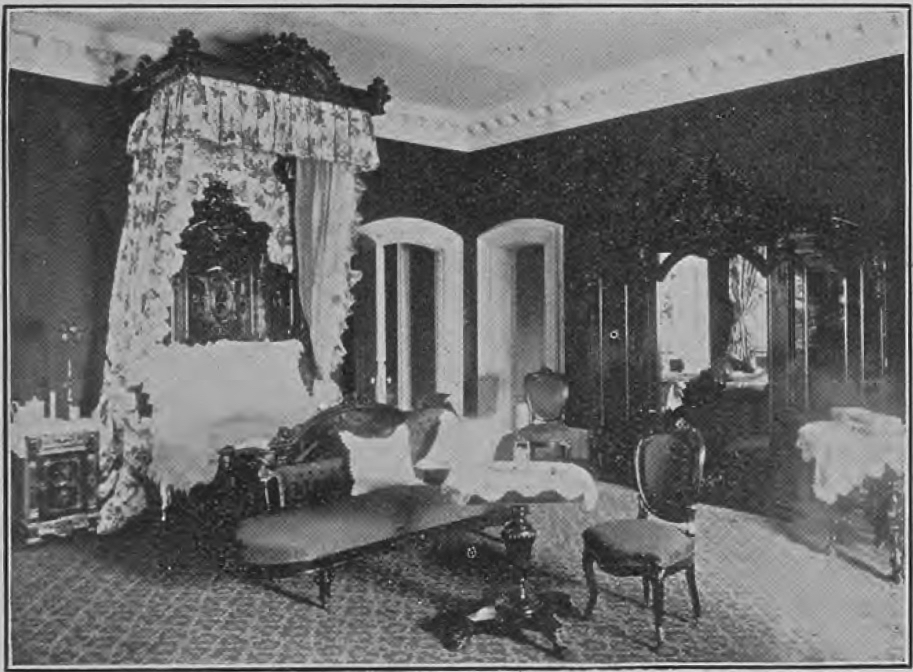
Guest room at Ravenscrag, fully furnished circa 1867 by J. & W. Hilton

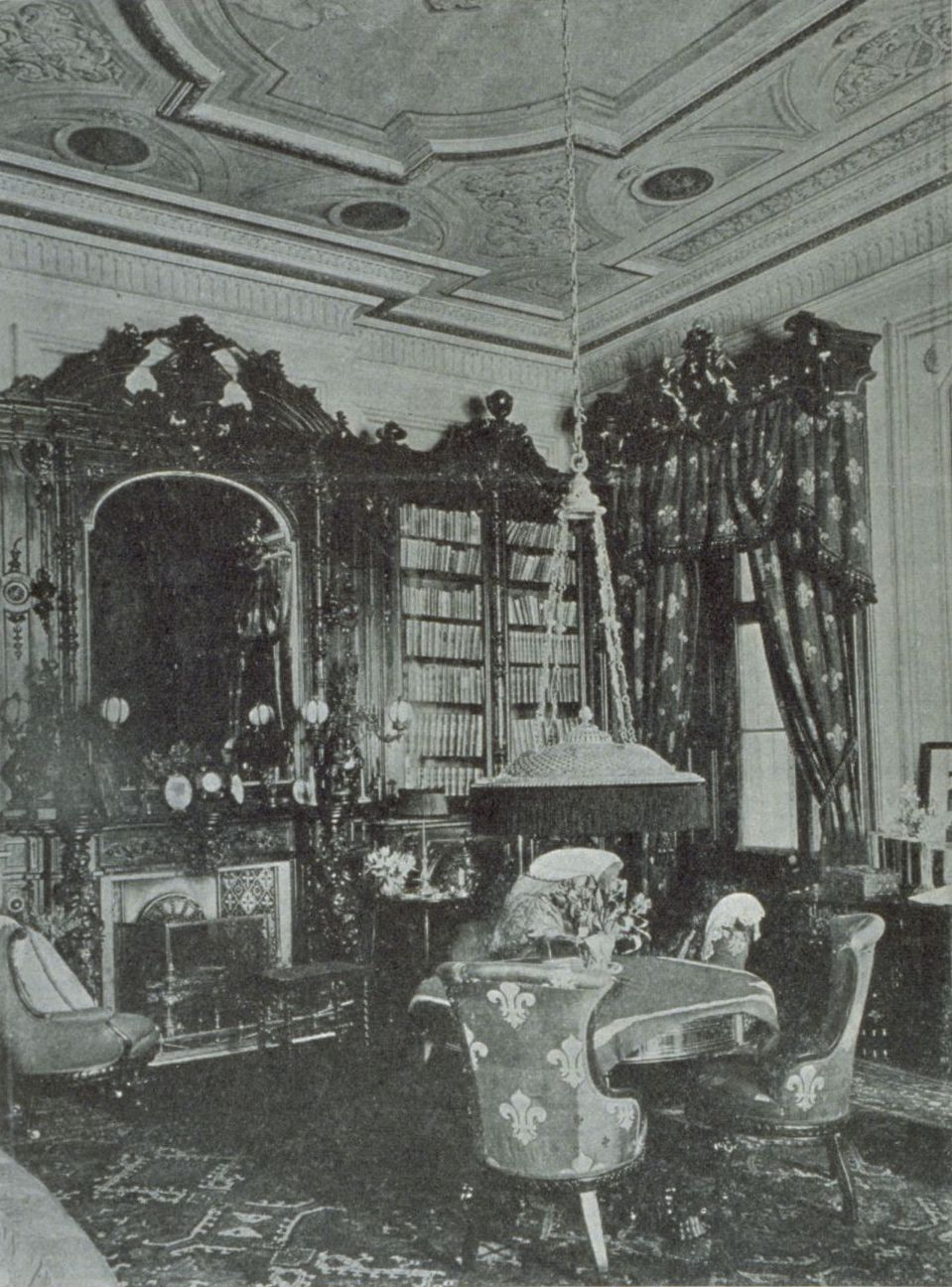
The library at Ravenscrag, fully furnished circa 1863 by J. & W. Hilton

Below is a non-exhaustive list of known works by one of John Hilton's firms:

- 1840s: Furniture from the residence of J. Benjamin (Montreal).
- 1850s: Part of the furniture from the residence of P. Holland, known as Charlderton Lodge, on Simpson Street (Montreal).
- 1850s: Part of the furniture from the residence of Mrs. Porteous on De La Gauchetière Street (Montreal).
- Circa 1852: All the furniture from the Ottawa Hotel (Saint-Jacques Street, Montreal).
- 1850s-60s: notably, mahogany chairs from the residence of H. Cochrane (1 Balmoral Place, Sainte-Catherine Street, Montreal).
- 1850s: furniture from the residence of W. R. Falconer (Gabriel Street, Griffintown, Montreal).
- Circa 1863: Furniture from the library and most likely all the furniture from Hugh Allan's house, known as Ravenscrag, in Montreal.
  - Circa 1867, Hugh Allan also commissioned a complete new bedroom set for the guest's suite at Ravenscrag.
- Circa 1864: Mahogany parlor furniture including 2 armchairs, 6 chairs and a sofa for an "officer's" residence
- Circa 1865: Hat rack, sold for $500 to William Dow (Description: "The bottom is in the form of a chiffonier. In the middle of the door is a bundle of arms surmounted by laurels, the symbol of victory; on either side of the door are two fully armed ancient warriors; the top is of white marble, and above it rises a large mirror, the frame of which is decorated with carvings representing griffins and several other chimerical creations").
- Circa 1865: All the furniture from the steamboat Spartan of the Inland Steam Navigation Company.
- Circa 1866: Part of the furniture of the Richelieu Company's steamship "Québec".
- Circa 1867: All the furniture of the Merchants' Bank located at Place d'Armes in Montreal.
- 1860s: Living room furniture covered in silk brocatelle, unknown sponsor.
- Around 1871: some of the furnishings for James Goulden's pharmacy on Saint-Laurent Street, Montreal. (Note: Porter 1993, p. 280)
- Circa 1877: Furniture from the residence of David Torrance (Drummond Street, Montreal).

== Sources ==
=== Books / works ===
- Virtue, George, ed. (1851). The Art journal illustrated catalogue. The industry of all nations. London, UK: Bradbury & Evans. p. 432. Virtue.
- Rapport préliminaire du secrétaire du comité exécutif canadien de l'exposition universelle devant avoir lieu à Paris en 1855 (in French). Quebec City (Qc), Canada: Canada Gazette. 1854. p. 36. CanadaGazette.
- Catalogue of articles shown at the Provincial exhibition, held at Montreal and inaugurated by his Royal Highness the Prince of Wales, August, 1860. Montreal (Qc), Canada: printed by M. Longmoore & Co. August 25, 1860. p. 92. PE-1860.
- The Act of incorporation (23d Vic., cap. 13) and the by-laws. Montreal (QC), Canada: M. Longmoore & Co., Gazette Steam Press. January 4, 1864. p. 45.
- Longmoore, M., ed. (1864). Montreal Business Sketches with a Description of the City of Montreal : its public buildings and places of interest, and the Grand Trunk works at Point St. Charles, Victoria Bridge &c., &c. Montreal (Qc), Canada: Canada Railway Advertising Company. p. 235. ISBN 978-0-665-64530-3. Longmoore.
- Catalogue of Oil and Water-colour Paintings, Engravings, Photographs and Other Works of Art lent for the occasion and exhibited at the Mechanics' Hall, Montreal, February 27, 1865. Montreal (QC), Canada: Art Association of Montreal. February 27, 1865. p. 43. AAOM-1865.
- Catalogue of the Agricultural and Industrial Exhibition at the city of Montreal, on Tuesday, Wednesday, Thursday & Friday, 26th, 27th, 28th, and 29th September, 1865 : in the exhibition building, St. Catherine Street ... the priest's farm fronting on Guy and St. Catherine Streets. Montreal (QC), Canada: J.M. Gatehouse. 1865. p. 69. PE-1865.
- Porter, John R., ed. (1993). Un art de vivre : le meuble de goût à l'époque victorienne au Québec : Ravenscrag, la plus somptueuse résidence montréalaise de l'époque victorienne (in French). Montreal, Quebec: Musée des beaux-arts de Montréal; Musée de la civilisation de Québec. ISBN 2-89192-160-7. JRP.

=== Notorial acts ===
List of notorial acts in chronological order of publication:

- Jones Gibb, Isaac (Notary) (May 4, 1844). Notorial Act en minute, min. no. 4391 : "Hilton, J. & E. Baird : Division of Property held jointly". Notaries Records, Judicial District of Montreal: Superior Court Funds, National Archives of Quebec. AN-4391.
- Jones Gibb, Isaac (Notary) (May 14, 1844). Notorial Act en minute, min. no. 4428 : "Hilton, John & Edmond Baird : Articles of Copartnership". Notaries Records, Judicial District of Montreal: Superior Court Funds, National Archives of Quebec. AN-4428.
- Jones Gibb, Isaac (Notary) (July 20, 1844). Notorial Act en minute, min. no. 4620 : "Hilton, J. & E. Baird : Cancellation of Division of Property held jointly". Notaries Records, Judicial District of Montreal: Superior Court Funds, National Archives of Quebec. AN-4620.
- Smith, James (Notary) (July 28, 1853). Notorial Act en minute, min. no. 811 : "Last Will and Testament of John Hilton". Notaries Records, Judicial District of Montreal: Superior Court Funds, National Archives of Quebec. AN-811.
- Jones Gibb, Isaac (Notary) (October 2, 1857). Notorial Act en minute, min. no. 17597 : "John Hilton : Mortgage to William Learmont". Notaries Records, Judicial District of Montreal: Superior Court Funds, National Archives of Quebec. AN-17597.
- Jones Gibb, Isaac (Notary) (October 29, 1857). Notorial Act en minute, min. no. 17661 : "John Hilton : Mortgage to W. Fraser, W.E. Holmes & D. Robertson, Trustees". Notaries Records, Judicial District of Montreal: Superior Court Funds, National Archives of Quebec. AN-17661.
- Jones Gibb, Isaac (Notary) (December 24, 1866). Notorial Act en minute, min. no. 12441 : "Renonciation of Executorship by Messrs William Hilton & Robert Campbell to the Last Will and Testament of the Late John Hilton" (Cote BANQ:Cote:CN601,S208). Notaries Records, Judicial District of Montreal: Superior Court Funds, National Archives of Quebec. AN-12441.

=== Administrative documents ===
- Stewart, Andrew B. (January 5, 1872). "Insolvent Act of 1869 and its amendments. Matter of William and Edward Hilton". Official Gazette of Quebec (Document). Vol. 4, no. 1 (Official Editor of Quebec ed.). Quebec City (QC), Canada. p. 6.
- Stewart, Andrew B. (January 13, 1872). "Insolvent Act of 1869 and its amendments. Matter of William and Edward Hilton". Official Gazette of Quebec (Document). Vol. 4, no. 2 (Official Editor of Quebec ed.). Quebec City (QC), Canada. p. 49.
- Stewart, Andrew B. (February 3, 1872). "Insolvent Act of 1869 and its amendments. Matter of William and Edward Hilton". Official Gazette of Quebec (Document). Vol. 4, no. 5 (Official Editor of Quebec ed.). Quebec City (QC), Canada. p. 214.
- Stewart, Andrew B. (March 16, 1872). "Insolvent Act of 1869. Province of Quebec. Matter of J. & W. Hilton, Insolvents". Official Gazette of Quebec (Document). Vol. 4, no. 11 (Official Editor of Quebec ed.). Quebec City (QC), Canada. p. 483.
- Stewart, Andrew B. (May 18, 1872). "Insolvent Act of 1869. Province of Quebec. Matter of J. & W. Hilton, Insolvents". Official Gazette of Quebec (Document). Vol. 4, no. 20 (Official Editor of Quebec ed.). Quebec City (QC), Canada. p. 855.
- Stewart, Andrew B. (September 18, 1875). "Insolvent Act of 1875 and its amendments. Matter of William Hilton". Official Gazette of Quebec (Document). Vol. 7, no. 88 (Official Editor of Quebec ed.). Quebec City (QC), Canada. p. 1996.

=== Newspaper articles ===
- "By A. L. Macnider & J. Scott. Hilton & Baird Furniture Auction". The Montreal Herald (Newspaper). Vol. 14, no. 49 (The Herald Company ed.). Montreal (QC), Canada. April 16, 1825. p. 3.
- "Public Notice. No. 178 : In the King's Bench, District of Montreal, Province of Lower Canada, Ex parte : John Hilton and Edmond Baird". The Quebec Gazette (Newspaper). Vol. 17, no. 33 (John Charlton Fisher & William Kemble ed.). Montreal (QC), Canada. May 28, 1840. p. 4.
- "Incendie". La Minerve (Newspaper) (in French). Vol. 12, no. 13 (Augustin-Norbert Morin ed.). Montreal (QC), Canada. October 10, 1842. p. 2.
- "Montreal, October 8th : destructive fire". The Quebec Gazette (Newspaper). Vol. 5942, no. 80 (John Charlton Fisher & William Kemble ed.). Montreal (QC), Canada. October 10, 1842. p. 2.
- "Fire, French Square". The Quebec Gazette (Newspaper). Vol. 5994, no. 81 (John Charlton Fisher & William Kemble ed.). Montreal (QC), Canada. February 8, 1843. p. 2.
- "To Parties Furnishing, etc. J. Benjamin, Subscriber". The Quebec Mercury (Newspaper). Vol. 42, no. 17 (Josiah Blackburn & George T. Cary ed.). Montreal (QC), Canada. February 10, 1846. p. 3.
- "Remerciements [sic] (James Morice)". L'aurore des Canada (Newspaper) (in French). Vol. 8, no. 19 (F. Cinq-Mars ed.). Montreal (QC), Canada. May 20, 1846. p. 1.
- "Satin de laines (J. & W. Hilton)". L'aurore des Canada (Newspaper) (in French). Vol. 10, no. 88 (F. Cinq-Mars ed.). Montreal (QC), Canada. January 16, 1849. p. 1.
- "J. & W. Hilton (Annonce)". La Minerve (Newspaper) (in French). Vol. 22, no. 22 (Augustin-Norbert Morin ed.). Montreal (QC), Canada. November 22, 1849. p. 1.
- "Steam. J. & W. Hilton (Annonce)". Montreal Herald and Daily Commercial Gazette (Newspaper). Vol. 42, no. 66 (Robert Weir ed.). Montreal (QC), Canada. May 16, 1850. p. 2.
- "Grand Industrial Exhibition". The Montreal witness (Newspaper). Vol. 5, no. 27 (The Montreal witness Co. ed.). Montreal (QC), Canada. July 8, 1850. p. 1.
- "Provincial Industrial Commission. Great Exhibition to be Held in Montreal". Montreal Herald and Daily Commercial Gazette (Newspaper). Vol. 42, no. 199 (Robert Weir ed.). Montreal (QC), Canada. May 16, 1850. p. 1.
- "The Provincial Exhibition". The Quebec gazette (Newspaper). Vol. 42, no. 199 (printed by Brown & Gilmore, 1764-1874 ed.). Montreal (QC), Canada. October 21, 1850. p. 2.
- "List of persons who have been adjudged to receive prizes and diplomas at the Industrial Exhibition". The Quebec Mercury (Newspaper). Vol. 42, no. 199 (Josiah Blackburn & George T. Cary ed.). Montreal (QC), Canada. October 28, 1850. p. 1.
- "Le Canada à l'Exposition de Londres". Le Canadien (Newspaper) (in French). Vol. 21, no. 4. Montreal (QC), Canada. May 21, 1851. p. 1.
- "Her Majesty's Inspection of Canadian Contributions to the World's Fair". Montreal Herald and Daily Commercial Gazette (Newspaper). Vol. 43, no. 75 (Robert Weir ed.). Montreal (QC), Canada. May 28, 1851. p. 2.
- "Exposition de Londres (Correspondance particulière de la Gazette de Montréal). Palais de Crystal, Londres, 7 mai 1851". Le journal de Québec (Newspaper) (in French). Vol. 9, no. 77. Quebec City (QC), Canada. June 3, 1851. p. 1.
- "Hotel et Pensions. Hotel Ottawa, Grande rue Saint-Jacques". Le journal de Québec (Newspaper) (in French). Vol. 1, no. 46. Quebec City (QC), Canada. June 4, 1852. p. 1.
- "Brocatelles, Cornices, etc. J. & W. Hilton (Ad)". Montreal Herald and Daily Commercial Gazette (Newspaper). Vol. 44, no. 185 (Robert Weir ed.). Montreal (QC), Canada. October 2, 1852. p. 2.
- "Provincial Exhibition. PART II, Section 7 : Manufactures of Wood, Cabinet Ware, Carriages, etc". Montreal Herald and Daily Commercial Gazette (Newspaper). Vol. 45, no. 192 (Robert Weir ed.). Montreal (QC), Canada. October 11, 1853. p. 1.
- "Sale of Valuable Household Furniture [...] of Mrs. Porteous [...] on Lagauchetière Street. John Leeming (Ad)". Montreal Herald and Daily Commercial Gazette (Newspaper). Vol. 42, no. 103 (Robert Weir ed.). Montreal (QC), Canada. May 3, 1855. p. 2.
- "This Morning. Superior Household Furniture. (Residence of W. R. Falconer, Esq.). Benning & Barsalou (Ad)". Montreal Herald and Daily Commercial Gazette (Newspaper). Vol. 47, no. 108 (Robert Weir ed.). Montreal (QC), Canada. May 9, 1855. p. 3.
- "Lower Canada Provincial Agricultural Exhibition". Montreal Herald and Daily Commercial Gazette (Newspaper). Vol. 49, no. 221 (Robert Weir ed.). Montreal (QC), Canada. September 17, 1857. p. 2.
- "Lower Canada. Provincial Exhibition. Industrial Department". Montreal Herald and Daily Commercial Gazette (Newspaper). Vol. 50, no. 232 (Robert Weir ed.). Montreal (QC), Canada. September 30, 1858. p. 2.
- "Died. Mr. Edmond Baird". Montreal Herald and Daily Commercial Gazette (Newspaper). Vol. 51, no. 45 (Robert Weir ed.). Montreal (QC), Canada. February 23, 1859. p. 2.
- "Auction Sale by John Leeming & Co. Mrs. P. Holland Residence". Morning chronicle and commercial and shipping gazette (Newspaper). Vol. 14, no. 3676 (Quebec :Charles St. Michel,1850-1888 ed.). Quebec City (QC), Canada. April 2, 1860. p. 2.
- "Vente à l'encan de meubles de ménage supérieurs, par Benning et Barsalou". Le pays (Newspaper) (in French). Vol. 11, no. 37 (Montréal : Le pays,1852-1871 ed.). Montreal (QC), Canada. April 12, 1862. p. 3.
- "Les soussignés prennent la liberté d'attirer l'attention du public sur leur fonds actuel de meubles de ménage [...]. J. & W. Hilton (Ad)". Le pays (Newspaper) (in French). Vol. 11, no. 141 (Montréal : Le pays,1852-1871 ed.). Montreal (QC), Canada. December 23, 1862. p. 1.
- "L'Exposition Provinciale". La Minerve (Newspaper) (in French). Vol. 36, no. 4 (Augustin-Norbert Morin ed.). Montreal (QC), Canada. September 17, 1863. p. 2.
- "Exposition Provinciale. Liste des prix (Département Industriel, 2e classe, Section A)". Le pays (Newspaper) (in French). Vol. 12, no. 105 (Montréal : Le pays,1852-1871 ed.). Montreal (QC), Canada. September 29, 1863. p. 1.
- "Divers. MM. Hilton". La Minerve (Newspaper) (in French). Vol. 36, no. 10 (Augustin-Norbert Morin ed.). Montreal (QC), Canada. October 1, 1863. p. 2.
- "Grande Exposition à la Salle des Artisans". La Minerve (Newspaper) (in French). Vol. 37, no. 144 (Augustin-Norbert Morin ed.). Montreal (QC), Canada. February 28, 1865. p. 2.
- "Vente par encan, par Henry J. Shaw". L'Union Nationale (Newspaper) (in French). Vol. 1, no. 166 (Lanctot, Bouthillier et Thompson,1864-1867 ed.). Montreal (QC), Canada. March 21, 1865. p. 3.
- "New Steamer". Montreal Herald and Daily Commercial Gazette (Newspaper). Vol. 57, no. 117 (Robert Weir ed.). Montreal (QC), Canada. May 5, 1865. p. 1.
- "The Exhibition. Industrial Department : Prize List". Montreal Herald and Daily Commercial Gazette (Newspaper). Vol. 57, no. 233 (Robert Weir ed.). Montreal (QC), Canada. September 30, 1865. p. 2.
- "The Exhibition. Industrial Department (omission)". Montreal Herald and Daily Commercial Gazette (Newspaper). Vol. 57, no. 233 (Robert Weir ed.). Montreal (QC), Canada. September 30, 1865. p. 1.
- "L'Exposition Provinciale du Bas-Canada. Département Industriel : Seconde Classe". L'Ordre : union catholique (Newspaper) (in French). Vol. 7, no. 132 (Plinguet & Laplante ed.). Montreal (QC), Canada. October 2, 1865. p. 1.
- "Progress of Montreal. New Public and Prive Buildings : Upper Peel Street". Montreal Herald and Daily Commercial Gazette (Newspaper). Vol. 57, no. 301 (Robert Weir ed.). Montreal (QC), Canada. December 19, 1865. p. 1.
- "Handsome Mirror (by J. & W. Hilton)". Montreal Herald and Daily Commercial Gazette (Newspaper). Vol. 58, no. 81 (Robert Weir ed.). Montreal (QC), Canada. April 5, 1866. p. 1.
- "Progress of Montreal (Illustrated Edition). Merchants' Bank". Montreal Herald and Daily Commercial Gazette (Newspaper). Vol. 59, no. (DOUBLE SHEET) (Robert Weir ed.). Montreal (QC), Canada. March 1, 1867. p. 6.
- "Faits divers. Manufacture de meubles de MM. Hilton". Le Pays (Newspaper) (in French). Vol. 16, no. 35 (Le pays,1852-1871 ed.). Montreal (QC), Canada. April 6, 1867. p. 2.
- "Faits divers. Fabrique de M. Hilton". La Minerve (Newspaper) (in French). Vol. 39, no. 175 (Augustin-Norbert Morin ed.). Montreal (QC), Canada. April 6, 1867. p. 2.
- "Exposition Provinciale". La Minerve (Newspaper) (in French). Vol. 41, no. 7 (Augustin-Norbert Morin ed.). Montreal (QC), Canada. September 16, 1868. p. 2.
- "Provincial Exhibition for 1868". Morning chronicle and commercial and shipping gazette (Newspaper). Vol. 22, no. 8876 (Charles St. Michel, 1850-1888 ed.). Quebec City (QC), Canada. August 6, 1868. p. 3.
- "J. & W. Hilton (Annonce). Fabricants de meubles et décorateurs". La Minerve (Newspaper) (in French). Vol. 42, no. 68 (Augustin-Norbert Morin ed.). Montreal (QC), Canada. November 27, 1869. p. 3.
- "The Provincial Agricultural and Industrial Exhibition for 1870". The canadian gleaner (Newspaper). Vol. (?), no. 318 (Huntingdon : [Canadian gleaner], 1863-1912 ed.). Huntingdon (QC), Canada. August 11, 1870. p. 3.
- "Exposition Provinciale. Département Industriel". L'Ordre : union catholique (Newspaper) (in French). Vol. 12, no. 175 (Plinguet & Laplante ed.). Montreal (QC), Canada. September 20, 1870. p. 1.
- "Vente de meubles de prix, par Henry J. Shaw". Le Pays (Newspaper) (in French). Vol. 18, no. 274 (Le pays,1852-1871 ed.). Montreal (QC), Canada. October 5, 1870. p. 3.
- "Improvements. Drug store on St. Lawrence Street". Canadian Illustrated News (Newspaper). Vol. 4, no. 12 (Geo. E. Desbarats ed.). Montreal (QC), Canada. September 16, 1871. p. 7.
- "For Sale by the Suscribers (F. Smith, J. & W. Hilton)". The Evening Star (Newspaper). Vol. 4, no. 40 ([The evening star],1869-1877 ed.). Montreal (QC), Canada. February 16, 1872. p. 8.
- "Notice to Steamboat Companies (R. Williams, Upholsterer)". The Evening Star (Newspaper). Vol. 1, no. 52 ([The evening star],1869-1877 ed.). Montreal (QC), Canada. March 1, 1872. p. 2.
- "Cabinet and Upholstery Warehouse (J. & W. Hilton). Fire in St. Patrick's Hall". The Daily Witness (Newspaper). Vol. 11, no. 242 (John Dougall ed.). Montreal (QC), Canada. October 11, 1872. p. 4.
- "Princely Mansion. Lordship Bishop Conroy's New Residence". Morning chronicle and commercial and shipping gazette (Newspaper). Vol. 31, no. 11686 (Quebec :Charles St. Michel,1850-1888 ed.). Quebec City (QC), Canada. September 2, 1877. p. 1.

=== Website ===
- Collard, Elizabeth (2003). "HILTON, John". Dictionary of Canadian Biography. vol. 9. University of Laval/University of Toronto.
