= John Hylton =

John Hylton may refer to:

- John Hylton, de jure 18th Baron Hylton, English politician
- John Scott Hylton, English antiquary and poet

== See also ==
- Jack Hylton, English pianist, composer, band leader and impresario
- John Hilton (disambiguation)
