= James Thomson (cabinetmaker) =

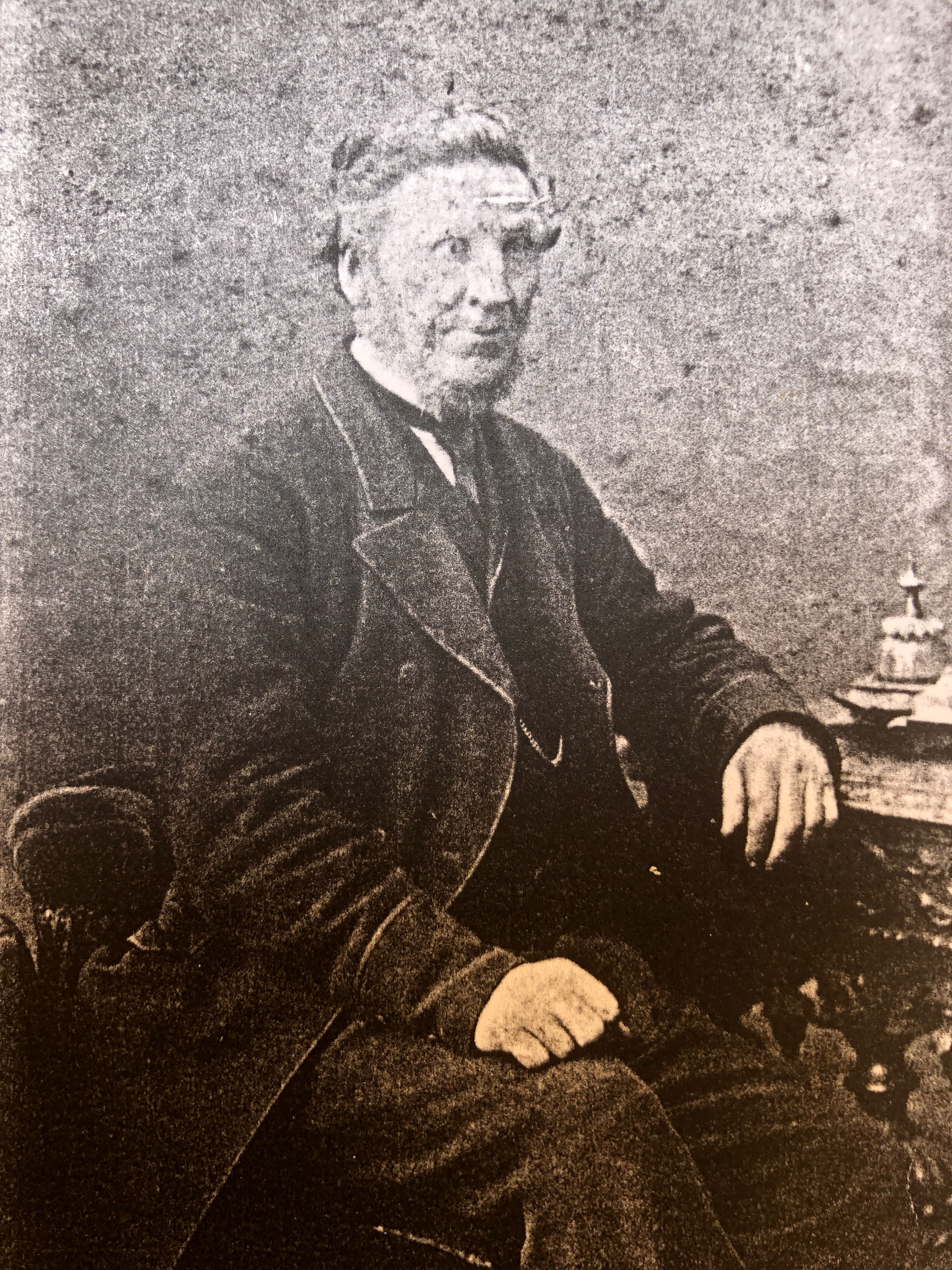
- Born: 1825; Tain, Scotland
- Died: August 14, 1896; Montreal, Canada
- Resting place: Mount Royal Cemetery
- Known for: Cabinetmaking and interior design
- Spouse: Marianne Stitt
- Children: James A., Charles, Jane, Mrs. John Morris and Mrs. Hughes
- Elected: Municipal councillor (St. Lambert, 1875-1882); Mayor (St. Lambert, 1882-1886)

James Thomson, born in 1825 in Tain, Scotland, and died on August 14, 1896, in Montreal, Canada, was a Scottish-born Canadian cabinetmaker, interior designer, merchant and local Canadian politician. He notably served as mayor of the municipality of Saint-Lambert from 1882 to 1886.

James Thomson produced bespoke furniture for, among others, Rideau Hall, the residence of Sir Hugh Allan, Ravenscrag, the residence of George Stephen, and various residences belonging to the family of John Redpath.

== Biography ==
James Thomson was born in 1825 in Tain, Scotland. He emigrated to Canada as a "young boy" and settled in Toronto, Ontario. He apprenticed as a cabinetmaker with the cabinetmaking and interior decorating firm Jacques & Hay, where he worked before becoming a foreman. From 1843 to 1849, he worked independently, then partnered with cabinetmaker John Drummond in 1849. (Note: MacKinnon 1975, p. 157) This partnership ended in 1850. In 1853, he partnered with cabinetmaker John Haigh. (Note: MacKinnon 1975, p. 158) Upon Haigh's death in September 1855, he partnered with cabinetmaker George McKeand, thus creating McKeand, Thomson & Co. The factory, located in a four-story brick building, employed eighty-five workers and produced £20,000 worth of furniture annually. In June 1857, for an unknown reason, the company was dissolved and liquidated.

In August 1857, James Thomson married Marianne Stitt. In 1858, the couple moved to Quebec City where James worked independently for a little over a year. Towards the end of 1859, the couple moved to Montreal and settled at 12-14 Bonaventure Street. (Note: Mackay & 1859-1870, p. 211 (Montreal Directory), Year 1861-62) Around 1862, James partnered with George Kellond, a sculptor he had met during his time in Quebec City. (Note: Mackay & 1859-1870, p. 242 (Montreal Directory), Year 1862-63) (Note: Lovell & 1826-1976, p. 171 (Quebec Directory), Year 1862-63) This partnership dissolved around 1864. (Note: Mackay & 1859-1870, p. 298 (Montreal Directory), Year 1863-64) (Note: Mackay & 1859-1870, p. 376 (Montreal Directory), Year 1864-65) Around 1865, James established his factory and warehouse on Saint Jacques Street and became "a serious competitor of the Hiltons at Montreal provincial exhibitions. Indeed, he presented to the judges and visitors furniture of such exquisite craftsmanship as that of John and William Hilton". (Note: Porter 1993, p. 390) In 1869, he obtained the necessary capital from Hugh Allan to build a brand-new factory at the intersection of Craig and Saint-François-Xavier Streets. (Note: Notorial Act, minute no. 14741, March 13, 1869, A.N.Q.) During the 1870s and 1880s, he gradually brought his sons, James A. and Charles Thomson, into the management of the business. Around 1888, the company moved its showrooms to Guy Street. (Note: Mackay & 1859-1870, p. 649 (Montreal Directory), Year 1888-89)

In 1890, illness forced James Thomson to retire from his business and delegate its management to his sons, James A. (an accountant) and Charles Thomson (a cabinetmaker). On February 17, 1890, he sold his Saint-Lambert residence, known as Maplehurst, and moved to Richmond Square (the intersection of Richmond and Saint-Antoine Streets) in Montreal. (Note: Mackay & 1859-1870, p. 753 (Montreal Directory), Year 1890-91) On July 9, 1890, W. A. Caldwell was appointed curator of James Thomson's estate. His sons and a former employee, cabinetmaker George H. Randall, continued the business under the name "James Thomson & Co.", which now specialized in office, warehouse, and store furniture, but not exclusively. This company ceased operations around 1899. (Note: Mackay & 1859-1870, p. 127 (Montreal Directory), Year 1899-1900) James Thomson died on August 14, 1896, in Montreal. His funeral took place on August 17, 1896, at the home of his daughter, Mrs. John Morris, at 47A Durocher Street. He was buried in Mount Royal Cemetery.

=== Political life ===
Around 1875, James Thomson and his family moved to Saint-Lambert. (Note: Mackay & 1859-1870, p. 630 (Montreal Directory), Year 1875-76) He was then elected municipal councillor and remained so until 1882. On February 6, 1882, he was elected mayor of the same municipality. He was successively re-elected to this position in 1883, 1884 and 1885.

=== Personal life ===
In August 1857, James Thomson married Marianne Stitt. Around 1875, James Thomson and his family moved to their new residence in Saint-Lambert, known as "Maplehurst." On August 3, 1877, one of his daughters, Jane Thomson, died at the age of twelve following an accident: while trying to pick berries, a stone was dislodged and fell on the young girl. His wife, Marianne Stitt, died on July 6, 1889, at the age of 55. He had five children: two sons, James A. and Charles, and three daughters, Jane, Mrs. John Morris, and Mrs. Hughes.

== Thomson and the artists ==
Here is a non-exhaustive list of artists who worked for or in association with James Thomson:

- Mr. Barnard.
- Édouard Bertrand, cabinetmaker. (Note: Porter 1993, p. 305)
- John Drummond, cabinetmaker.
- John Haigh, cabinetmaker.
- George Kellond, sculptor.
- Mr. Lavallée.
- George McKeand, cabinetmaker.
- George H. Randall, cabinetmaker.

== Exhibitions and awards ==
Below is a non-exhaustive list of exhibitions in which James Thomson's company has exhibited works:

Year	Exhibition	Date	Location	Furniture on display and awards (if applicable)
1849	Provincial Exhibition	September 18-(?), 1849	(Canada) Kingston, Ontario	Table: 1st prize; Sofa: 1st prize; Writing desk, 1st prize.
1863	Provincial Exhibition (Industrial Department)	September 15-17, 1863	(Canada) Montreal (Crystal Palace)	Shelf, Diploma and 1st prize.
1865	Provincial Exhibition (Industrial Department)	September 26-29, 1865	(Canada) Montreal (Crystal Palace)	Bedroom furniture set, 1st prize; Billiard table, honorable mention; Walnut dining table, 1st prize; Sideboard, 2nd prize; Shelf, special prize; Etc. (Note: Provincial Exhibition Catalogue 1865, p. 50) (Note: Porter 1993, p. 376)
1867	World's Fair	April 1 - November 3, 1867	Paris, France	Table: "The table's body is made of finely carved black walnut. The mirror-polished top is composed of a wide variety of woods in diverse hues, inlaid and arranged in foliage motifs, etc., creating a brilliantly lustrous effect. Considered a piece of exceptional quality, it will undoubtedly be a striking addition to the World's Fair, showcasing the expertise of our Canadian artisans in the art of ornamental furniture." · (Note: Porter 1993, p. 382)
1880	Dominion Exhibition (Industrial Department)	September 14 - 24, 1880	(Canada) Montreal (Crystal Palace)	Dining room sideboard, 1st prize; Dining room chairs; Carved wooden fireplace mantel, 1st prize; Japanese style chair, honorable mention; Armchair, 1st prize; Card game table; Wooden clock stand; Wardrobe; Etc.
1886	Colonial and Indian Exhibition	May 4 - October 15, 1886	South Kensington (United Kingdom)	N.B. Although James Thomson's company produced furniture specifically for this exhibition, it ultimately did not participate.: Dining room furniture set: "The sideboard stands over 12 feet in height and is 10 feet 6 inches long; it is in quartered oak with a center piece of plate glass with bevelled edge. Here and there, in just the right spot, are to be seen heavy oak finishings, deeply and richly carved, while the relief wood is of pollack oak, the frame and finish being entirely of Canadian oak, the moulding all hand carved and of the chastest designs. The dining table is 18 x 5 feet and is also in oak, heavily carved and trussed in curved moulding with iron slides. The buffet is of the same design as the sideboard; the whole being in the much admired renaissance style. The chairs, ten in number, were richly finished in morocco over heavy oak. There was also made a heavy inlaid centre table in black ebony, inlaid with brass, copper and mother of pearl, which forms the centre, while surrounding this is to be seen, in contrast, white medals set in mahogany and white wood. The finishings are of old fashioned chases brass, the table throughout being of Louis XVI style. The cost of the whole set cannot be les than $ 4,000".

== List of works ==
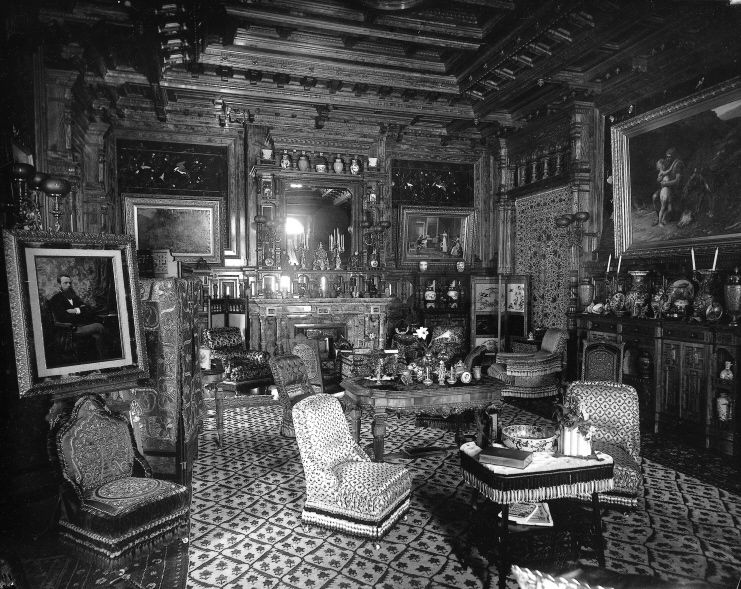
Living room of George Stephen House: some of the furniture was made by James Thomson between 1880 and 1884

Below is a non-exhaustive list of known works by James Thomson's company:

- 1860s: Part of the furnishings for the residence of J. Gordon Makenzie (3 Prince of Wales Terrace, Montreal).
- 1860s: Part of the furnishings for the residence of Robert and Jane Pilkington (8 Holyrood Place, McGill College Avenue).
- 1860s: Part of the furnishings for the Montreal Club (125 Great St. James Street, Montreal).
- 1860s-70s: Furnishings for the residence of Hugh Allan, known as Ravenscrag.
- Circa 1869: Part of the furnishings for Rideau Hall.
- 1860s-70s: Furnishings for the residence of John Redpath, known as "Terrace Bank". (Note: Porter 1993, p. 289)
- 1870s-80s: Part of the furnishings from the residence of Robert Kane (394 Saint-Antoine Street, Montreal).
- 1870s: Part of the furnishings from the residence of Hector Hébert (320 Lagauchetière Street, Montreal)
- 1870s: Part of the furnishings from the residence of J. H. Wilkins (122 Shuter Street, Montreal).
- 1870s: Part of the furnishings from the residence of Henry H. Atwater (45 Belmont Street, Montreal)
- 1870s: Part of the furnishings from the residence of D. Butters (749 Dorchester Street, Montreal).
- 1870s-80s: Part of the furnishings from the residence of the Honourable John Hamilton, Canadian Senator (917 Sherbrooke Street, Montreal).
- 1870s-80s: Part of the furnishings from the residence of Robert A. Smith, of the Hugh & Andrew Allan Shipping Company ("Allan Line").
- 1870s-80s: Part of the furnishings from the residence of E. A. Bernard, Esquire (944 Dorchester Street, Montreal).
- 1870s-80s: Part of the furnishings from the residence of John Cowan (90 Sainte-Famille Street, Montreal).
- 1870s-80s: Part of the furnishings from the residence located at 1821-1823 Notre-Dame Street, Montreal.
- 1870s-80s: Part of the furnishings from the residence of James McDougall, Esquire, located at 808 Palace Street, Montreal.
- Around 1871: Design of some of the furnishings for James Goulden's pharmacy on Saint-Laurent Street, Montreal. (Note: Porter 1993, p. 280)
- Around 1879: Some of the furnishings for the steamship SS. Sarmatian of the Hugh & Andrew Allan Shipping Company (“Allan Line”).
- Between 1880 and 1884: Some of the furnishings for the George Stephen House.
- Around 1885: All the furnishings for the official Canadian government railway car, known as the Ottawa, of the Prince Edward Island Railway.
Reclining chaise lounge of James Thomson & Co. in 1891.

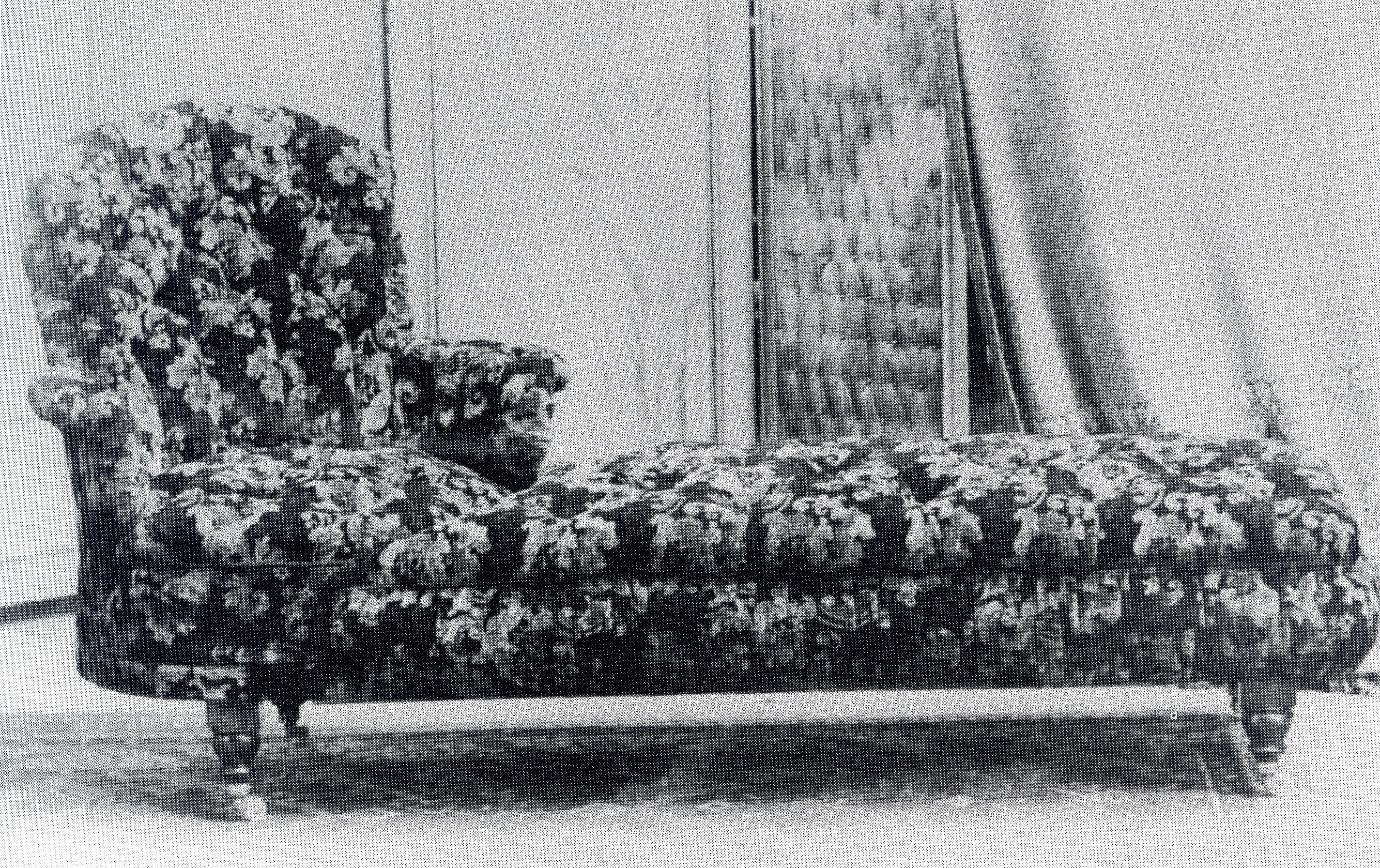

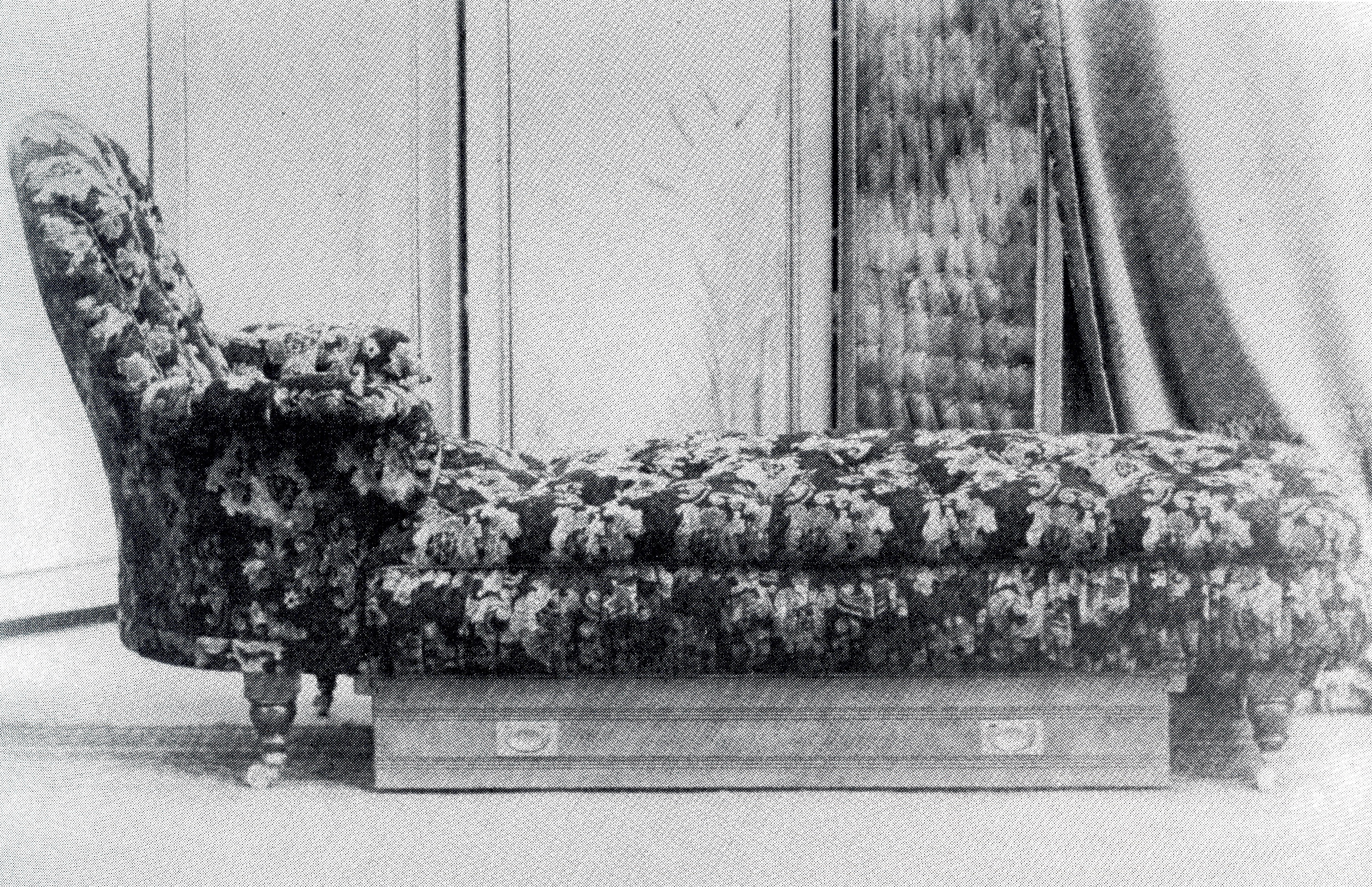

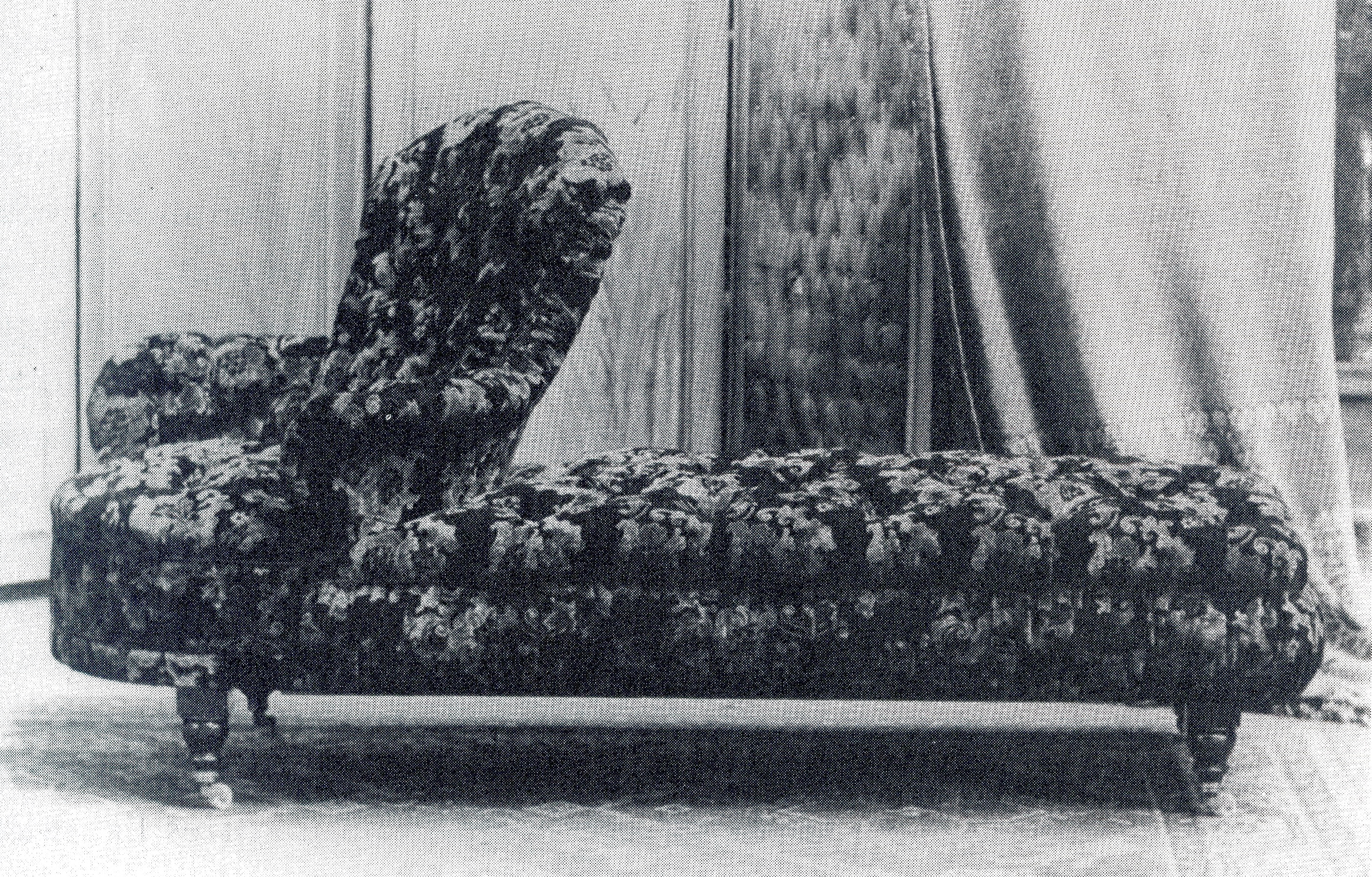

== Sources ==
=== Books / works ===
List of books in chronological order of publication:

- W. S. Mackay, Robert, ed. (1859–1870). The Montreal Directory. Montreal, Quebec: John Lovell. Lovell.
- Lovell, John, ed. (1822–1976). Quebec Directory. Quebec City, Quebec: John Lovell (edited G. H. Cherrier). Cherrier.
- Catalogue of the Agricultural and Industrial Exhibition at the city of Montreal, on Tuesday, Wednesday, Thursday & Friday, 26th, 27th, 28th, and 29th September, 1865: in the exhibition building, St. Catherine Street ... the priest's farm fronting on Guy and St. Catherine Streets. Montreal (QC), Canada: J.M. Gatehouse. 1865. p. 69. PE-1865.
- Campbell, Duke of Argyll, John, ed. (1886). Industries of Canada: City of Montreal, historical and descriptive review, leading firms and moneyed institutions. Montreal, Quebec: issued by the Historical Publishing Company. p. 160. JC-1886.
- MacKinnon, Joan, ed. (1975). A checklist of Toronto cabinet and chair makers, 1800-1865. Montreal, Quebec: National Museums of Canada. p. 206. JM.
- Hamilton-Hubbard, Robert, ed. (1977). Rideau Hall: an illustrated history of Government House, Ottawa, from Victorian times to the present day. Montreal, Quebec; Toronto, Ontario: National Museums of Canada. p. 206. ISBN 0-7735-0337-4. RHH.
- Porter, John R., ed. (1993). Un art de vivre: le meuble de goût à l'époque victorienne au Québec: Ravenscrag, la plus somptueuse résidence montréalaise de l'époque victorienne (in French). Montreal, Quebec: Musée des beaux-arts de Montréal; Musée de la civilisation de Québec. ISBN 2-89192-160-7. JRP.

=== Notorial acts ===
List of notorial acts in chronological order of publication:

- Stewart Hunter, James (Notary) (March 13, 1869). Notorial Act en minute, min. no. 14741: "Lease and Agreement to & between Hugh Allan, Esq., and Mr. James Thomson" (P.619). Notaries Records, Judicial District of Montreal: Superior Court Funds, National Archives of Quebec (Cote: CN601,S208). AN-14741.
- Stewart Hunter, James (Notary) (March 13, 1869). Notorial Act en minute, min. no. 14742: "Contract and Agreement between Mr. Léon Bruneau and Hugh Allan, Esq." (P.622). Notaries Records, Judicial District of Montreal: Superior Court Funds, National Archives of Quebec (Cote: CN601,S208). AN-14742.
- Stewart Hunter, James (Notary) (March 13, 1869). Notorial Act en minute, min. no. 14743: "Contract and Agreement for Brick Work between Mr. Joseph Brunel and Hugh Allan, Esq. and James Thomson (intervening party)" (P.646). Notaries Records, Judicial District of Montreal: Superior Court Funds, National Archives of Quebec (Cote: CN601,S208). AN-14743.
- Stewart Hunter, James (Notary) (March 13, 1869). Notorial Act en minute, min. no. 14744: "Contract and Agreement for Carpenters and Joiners Work between Mr. George Roberts and Hugh Allan, Esq. and Mr. James Thomson (intervening party)" (P.660). Notaries Records, Judicial District of Montreal: Superior Court Funds, National Archives of Quebec (Cote: CN601,S208). AN-14744.
- Stewart Hunter, James (Notary) (March 13, 1869). Notorial Act en minute, min. no. 14745: "Contract and Agreement for Plasterers Work between Mr. George McLean and Hugh Allan, Esq. and Mr. James Thomson (intervening party)". Notaries Records, Judicial District of Montreal: Superior Court Funds, National Archives of Quebec (Cote: CN601,S208). AN-14745.
- Stewart Hunter, James (Notary) (March 13, 1869). Notorial Act en minute, min. no. 14746: "Contract and Agreement for Iron Work between Messrs. Ives & Allen and Hugh Allan, Esq. and Mr. James Thomson (intervening party))" (P.690). Notaries Records, Judicial District of Montreal: Superior Court Funds, National Archives of Quebec (Cote: CN601,S208). AN-14746.
- Normandeau, Pierre-Étienne (Notary) (September 29, 1871). Notorial Act en minute, min. no. 1450: "Lease. Samuel Elsdale Molson to James Thomson" (P.191). Notaries Records, Judicial District of Montreal: Superior Court Funds, National Archives of Quebec (Cote: CN601,S303). AN-1450.

=== Administrative document ===
- "Estimates (Rideau Hall)". Department of Public Works Records (Documents) (Public Archives of Canada ed.). Ottawa (Ontario), Canada. October 1869.

=== Newspaper articles ===
- "Law Intelligence: Superior Court [Reported for the Montreal Gazette]. Jury Trial". Montreal Herald and Daily Commercial Gazette (Newspaper). Vol. 51, no. 301 (Robert Weir ed.). Montreal (QC), Canada. December 19, 1859. p. 1.
- "Exposition Provinciale. Liste des prix (Département Industriel, 2e classe, Section A)". Le pays (Newspaper) (in French). Vol. 12, no. 105 (Le pays,1852-1871 ed.). Montreal (QC), Canada. September 29, 1863. p. 1.
- "The Exhibition. Industrial Department: Prize List". Montreal Herald and Daily Commercial Gazette (Newspaper). Vol. 57, no. 233 (Robert Weir ed.). Montreal (QC), Canada. September 30, 1865. p. 2.
- "Auction sale. Gordon Mackenzie's valuable and modern furniture". Montreal Herald and Daily Commercial Gazette (Newspaper). Vol. 58, no. 87 (Robert Weir ed.). Montreal (QC), Canada. April 12, 1866. p. 2.
- "Five Dollars Reward". The Daily Witness (Newspaper). Vol. 7, no. 247 (John Dougall ed.). Montreal (QC), Canada. October 18, 1866. p. 2.
- "For the Paris Exhibition". The Daily Witness (Newspaper). Vol. 8, no. 6 (John Dougall ed.). Montreal (QC), Canada. January 8, 1867. p. 3.
- "Highly important sale (John J. Arnton, auctioneer): 8, Holyrood Place, McGill College Avenue)". The Daily Witness (Newspaper). Vol. 8, no. 94 (John Dougall ed.). Montreal (QC), Canada. April 20, 1867. p. 3.
- "A Card. Mr. James Thomson, Cabinet-Maker and Upholsterer, 129 Great St. James Street". The Daily Witness (Newspaper). Vol. 8, no. 127 (John Dougall ed.). Montreal (QC), Canada. May 30, 1867. p. 2.
- "Auction Sale. Montreal Club (125, Great St. James Street)". The Daily Witness (Newspaper). Vol. 9, no. 266 (John Dougall ed.). Montreal (QC), Canada. November 9, 1868. p. 3.
- "Improvements. Drug store on St. Lawrence Street". Canadian Illustrated News (Newspaper). Vol. 4, no. 12 (Geo. E. Desbarats ed.). Montreal (QC), Canada. September 16, 1871. p. 7.
- "The Saturday Half-Holiday. To the Editor of the Star". The Evening Star (Newspaper). Vol. 9, no. 166 ([The evening star],1869-1877 ed.). Montreal (QC), Canada. July 17, 1872. p. 3.
- "The Belle Scandal. The investigation continued". The Montreal Witness (Newspaper). Vol. 28, no. 17 (The Montreal witness Co. ed.). Montreal (QC), Canada. February 9, 1873. p. 2.
- "Important Sale of Costly Furniture. On Saturday, the 17th Inst". Montreal Herald and Daily Commercial Gazette (Newspaper). Vol. 67, no. 87 (Robert Weir ed.). Montreal (QC), Canada. April 13, 1875. p. 3.
- "Preliminary Notice". The Daily Witness (Newspaper). Vol. 15, no. 78 (John Dougall ed.). Montreal (QC), Canada. April 3, 1876. p. 2.
- "Bons meubles par encan. (Hector Hébert, 320 Lagauchetière)". La Minerve (Newspaper) (in French). Vol. 49, no. 169 (Augustin-Norbert Morin ed.). Montreal (QC), Canada. March 31, 1877. p. 3.
- "Very attractive sale of modern household furniture...". The Evening Star (Newspaper). Vol. 60, no. 82 ([The evening star],1869-1877 ed.). Montreal (QC), Canada. April 7, 1877. p. 2.
- "Deaths. THOMSON. (Jane)". The Star (Newspaper). Vol. 9, no. 181 ([Unidentified],1877-1880 ed.). Montreal (QC), Canada. August 4, 1877. p. 3.
- "Fatal Accident at St. Lambert". The Daily Witness (Newspaper). Vol. 16, no. 179 (John Dougall ed.). Montreal (QC), Canada. August 4, 1877. p. 3.
- "Watson vs. Thomson: Was it Culpable Negligence?". The Daily Witness (Newspaper). Vol. 18, no. 78 (John Dougall ed.). Montreal (QC), Canada. April 12, 1879. p. 8.
- "Vente par encan par Henry J. Shaw (Henry W. Atwater, 45 Belmont)". La Minerve (Newspaper) (in French). Vol. 51, no. 271 (Augustin-Norbert Morin ed.). Montreal (QC), Canada. August 11, 1879. p. 3.
- "The SS. "Sarmatian". Her Royal Passenger's Quarters. The Approaching Departure. The Programme at Quebec". Montreal Herald and Daily Commercial Gazette (Newspaper). Vol. 71, no. 247 (Robert Weir ed.). Montreal (QC), Canada. October 16, 1879. p. 2.
- "Vente par encan par M. Hicks & Cie (D. Butters, 749 Dorchester, Montréal)". La Minerve (Newspaper) (in French). Vol. 52, no. 75 (Augustin-Norbert Morin ed.). Montreal (QC), Canada. December 5, 1879. p. 3.
- "Assault Case at St. Lambert. Mr. John Beatty against Mr James Thomson". The Daily Witness (Newspaper). Vol. 9, no. 48 (John Dougall ed.). Montreal (QC), Canada. February 27, 1880. p. 8.
- "Court of Special Sessions: Beatty-Thomson Affair". Montreal Herald and Daily Commercial Gazette (Newspaper). Vol. 72, no. 58 (Robert Weir ed.). Montreal (QC), Canada. March 9, 1880. p. 4.
- "THOMSON'S (Ad)". Montreal Herald and Daily Commercial Gazette (Newspaper). Vol. 72, no. 98 (Robert Weir ed.). Montreal (QC), Canada. April 24, 1880. p. 3.
- "Our Exhibition. The Prize List. (Continued)". The Star (Newspaper). Vol. 12, no. 221 ([Unidentified],1877-1880 ed.). Montreal (QC), Canada. September 18, 1880. p. 1.
- "À travers l'Exposition. Marqueterie et Ébénisterie". La Minerve (Newspaper) (in French). Vol. 53, no. 11 (Augustin-Norbert Morin ed.). Montreal (QC), Canada. September 21, 1880. p. 2.
- "Sale of Valuable Furniture by C. F. Elwes. 394, St. Antoine Street". The Star (Newspaper). Vol. 12, no. 235 ([Unidentified],1877-1880 ed.). Montreal (QC), Canada. October 5, 1880. p. 2.
- "Suburban. Coming Municipal Elections in St. Lambert". The Star (Newspaper). Vol. 12, no. 309 ([Unidentified],1877-1880 ed.). Montreal (QC), Canada. December 31, 1880. p. 1.
- "Important Sale of Magnificent Furniture. (Ad)". Montreal Herald and Daily Commercial Gazette (Newspaper). Vol. 73, no. 81 (Robert Weir ed.). Montreal (QC), Canada. April 5, 1881. p. 3.
- "Municipal Affairs. St. Lambert". The Montreal Daily Star (Newspaper). Vol. 14, no. 31 ([Montreal daily star],1881-1951 ed.). Montreal (QC), Canada. February 7, 1882. p. 2.
- "The "Countess" Again". The Daily Witness (Newspaper). Vol. 21, no. 99 (John Dougall ed.). Montreal (QC), Canada. April 29, 1882. p. 8.
- "Mr. James Thomson, the Well-known Cabinet-Maker, Has instructed us to announce a Special Sale during the Exhibition [...] (Ad)". Montreal Herald and Daily Commercial Gazette (Newspaper). Vol. 74, no. 213 (Robert Weir ed.). Montreal (QC), Canada. September 6, 1882. p. 5.
- "Municipal Affairs. St. Lambert". The Montreal Daily Star (Newspaper). Vol. 15, no. 297 ([Montreal daily star],1881-1951 ed.). Montreal (QC), Canada. December 18, 1883. p. 7.
- "Municipal Elections. St. Lambert". The Montreal Daily Star (Newspaper). Vol. 16, no. 54 ([Montreal daily star],1881-1951 ed.). Montreal (QC), Canada. March 4, 1884. p. 4.
- "Montreal's Buildings: The mansion of Mr. Geo. Stephen, President of the Canadian Pacific Railway". Montreal weekly witness commercial review and family news paper (Newspaper). Vol. 38, no. 11 ([Unidentified] ed.). Montreal (QC), Canada. March 12, 1884. p. 1.
- "The Food Act. The First Case Under the New Act". Montreal Herald and Daily Commercial Gazette (Newspaper). Vol. 76, no. 119 (Robert Weir ed.). Montreal (QC), Canada. May 17, 1884. p. 7.
- "More Accidents by Tobogganing. A Leading Citizen Seriously Injured". Montreal Herald and Daily Commercial Gazette (Newspaper). Vol. 77, no. 33 (Robert Weir ed.). Montreal (QC), Canada. February 7, 1885. p. 8.
- "Local News. Government official car "Ottawa"". The Montreal Daily Star (Newspaper). Vol. 17, no. 48 ([Montreal daily star],1881-1951 ed.). Montreal (QC), Canada. February 28, 1885. p. 1.
- "Municipal Elections. St. Lambert". The Montreal Daily Star (Newspaper). Vol. 17, no. 54 ([Montreal daily star],1881-1951 ed.). Montreal (QC), Canada. March 5, 1885. p. 2.
- "Furntirue. James Thomson". The Evening Star (Newspaper). Vol. 18, no. 19 ([The evening star],1869-1877 ed.). Montreal (QC), Canada. January 23, 1886. p. 6.
- "It did not go. Colonial and Indian Exhibition". Montreal Herald and Daily Commercial Gazette (Newspaper). Vol. 78, no. 116 (Robert Weir ed.). Montreal (QC), Canada. May 15, 1885. p. 8.
- "James Thomson (Ad)". Montreal Herald and Daily Commercial Gazette (Newspaper). Vol. 79, no. 292 (Robert Weir ed.). Montreal (QC), Canada. December 8, 1887. p. 4.
- "Improving Granite Buildings". Montreal Herald and Daily Commercial Gazette (Newspaper). Vol. 81, no. 9 (Robert Weir ed.). Montreal (QC), Canada. January 11, 1888. p. 5.
- "Very Attractive Sale of House Hold Furniture: Sale at 944, Dorchester Street by M. Hicks & Co". The Montreal Daily Star (Newspaper). Vol. 20, no. 90 ([Montreal daily star],1881-1951 ed.). Montreal (QC), Canada. April 17, 1888. p. 4.
- "Action Sales, by W. H. Arnton. Estate Late Hon. Jno. Hamilton". The Montreal Herald (Newspaper). Vol. 81, no. 9 (The Herald Publishing Company ed.). Montreal (QC), Canada. April 8, 1889. p. 5.
- "The R. A. Smith Sale, by William H. Arnton". The Montreal Herald (Newspaper). Vol. 82, no. 85 (The Herald Publishing Company ed.). Montreal (QC), Canada. April 9, 1889. p. 5.
- "Attention is requested. Sale at 1821-1823, Notre-Dame Street by M. Hick & Co". The Daily Witness (Newspaper). Vol. 30, no. 106 (John Dougall ed.). Montreal (QC), Canada. June 6, 1889. p. 6.
- "Dead. Thomson (Marianne Stitt)". The Daily Witness (Newspaper). Vol. 30, no. 134 (John Dougall ed.). Montreal (QC), Canada. July 8, 1889. p. 1.
- "Auction sales by James Stewart & Co. Handsome Summer Residence, St. Lambert. James Thomson". The Montreal Herald (Newspaper). Vol. 83, no. 39 (The Herald Publishing Company ed.). Montreal (QC), Canada. February 14, 1890. p. 5.
- "Attention is requested. Sale at 808. Palace Street by M. Hick & Co". The Daily Witness (Newspaper). Vol. 31, no. 90 (John Dougall ed.). Montreal (QC), Canada. April 17, 1890. p. 8.
- "News. James Thomson". The Montreal Herald (Newspaper). Vol. 83, no. 135 (The Herald Publishing Company ed.). Montreal (QC), Canada. June 7, 1890. p. 2.
- "Jottings about town. W. A. Caldwell, curator of the estate of James Thomson". The Montreal Herald (Newspaper). Vol. 83, no. 168 (The Herald Publishing Company ed.). Montreal (QC), Canada. July 10, 1890. p. 5.
- "News. James Thomson". The Montreal Daily Star (Newspaper). Vol. 22, no. 209 ([Montreal daily star],1881-1951 ed.). Montreal (QC), Canada. September 5, 1890. p. 4.
- "Sale of Substantial Walnut Furniture. M. Hicks & Co". The Montreal Daily Star (Newspaper). Vol. 23, no. 94 ([Montreal daily star],1881-1951 ed.). Montreal (QC), Canada. April 22, 1891. p. 5.
- "A Larger Post Office. Some Changes and Purchases Which Will Interest Montrealers". The Montreal Daily Star (Newspaper). Vol. 85, no. 195 ([Montreal daily star],1881-1951 ed.). Montreal (QC), Canada. August 18, 1892. p. 8.
- "Death of an old citizen. James Thomson". The Daily Witness (Newspaper). Vol. 37, no. 191 (John Dougall ed.). Montreal (QC), Canada. August 15, 1896. p. 3.
- "Funeral of Mr. Thomson". The Daily Witness (Newspaper). Vol. 37, no. 192 (John Dougall ed.). Montreal (QC), Canada. August 17, 1896. p. 3.
- "Obituary. Mr. James Thomson". The Gazette (Newspaper). Vol. 125, no. 197 (Postmedia Network Inc. ed.). Montreal (QC), Canada. August 17, 1896. p. 3.
- "Nouveaux établissements". Le Prix courant (Newspaper) (in French). Vol. 9, no. 3 (Compagnie de Publications Commerciales ed.). Montreal (QC), Canada. August 18, 1896. p. 31.
- "James Thomson & Co. (Ad)". The Daily Witness (Newspaper). Vol. 37, no. 279 (John Dougall ed.). Montreal (QC), Canada. November 28, 1896. p. 13.
