= John Hilton (cricketer, born 1838) =

English cricketer

Personal information
- Full name: John Hilton
- Born: 19 April 1838; Mansfield, Nottinghamshire, England
- Died: 8 May 1910 (aged 72); Stafford, Staffordshire, England
- Batting: Unknown
- Relatives: John Hilton, Sr. (father)

Domestic team information
- Years: Team
- 1865: Nottinghamshire

Career statistics
Competition	First-class
Matches	1
Runs scored	7
Batting average	7.00
100s/50s	–/–
Top score	7
Balls bowled	–
Wickets	–
Bowling average	–
5 wickets in innings	–
10 wickets in match	–
Best bowling	–
Catches/stumpings	–/–
- Source: Cricinfo, 18 February 2013

John Hilton (19 April 1838 – 8 May 1910) was an English cricketer. Hilton's batting style is unknown. He was born at Mansfield, Nottinghamshire.

Hilton made a single first-class appearance for Nottinghamshire against Surrey in 1865 at Trent Bridge. He batted once in Nottinghamshire's nine wicket victory, opening the batting in their first-innings he scored 7 runs before he was dismissed by Tom Sewell. This was his only major appearance for Nottinghamshire.

He died at Stafford, Staffordshire on 8 May 1910. His father John Hilton senior also played first-class cricket.
