= John Hilton the younger =

English composer

John Hilton (ca. 1599 – 1657) was an English early Baroque composer. He is best known for his books Ayres or Fa-Las for Three Voices and Catch That Catch Can.

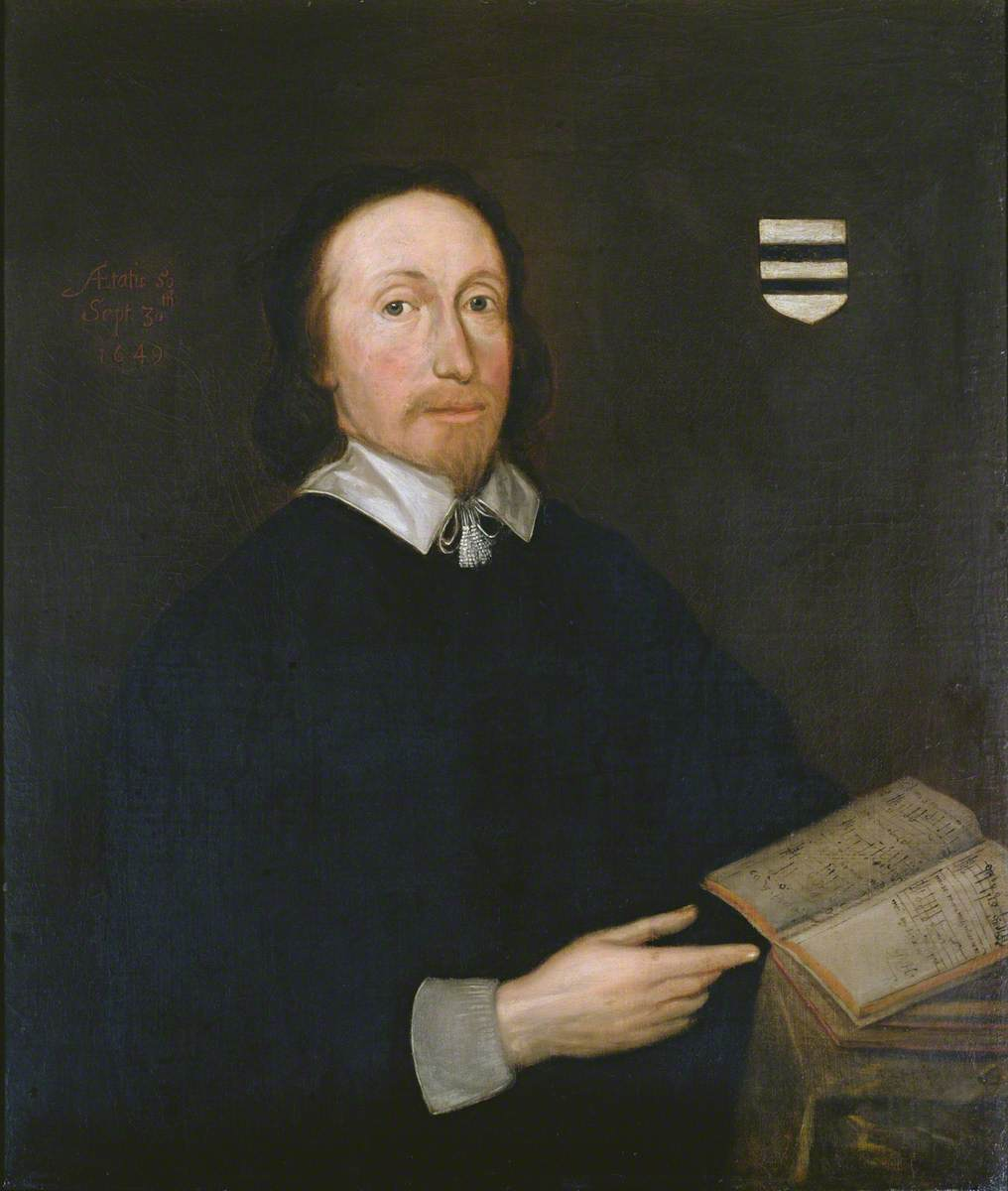
John Hilton

== Life ==
Hilton was born about 1599 in Cambridge. His father was probably the church musician and composer John Hilton the elder, who died in Cambridge in 1609. Hilton junior became organist at St. Margaret's Church, Westminster in 1628, having published his music book Ayres or Fa-Las for Three Voices in 1627. In 1635, Hilton was lutenist to Charles I. Some time in the 1630s, he composed The Judgement of Solomon, The Judgement of Paris, and The Temptation of Job. These are all similar to small-scale oratorios and operas. His collection of glees and catches, Catch That Catch Can, was published in 1652. He died in 1657 and was buried on 21 March 1657 at Westminster.

== Works ==
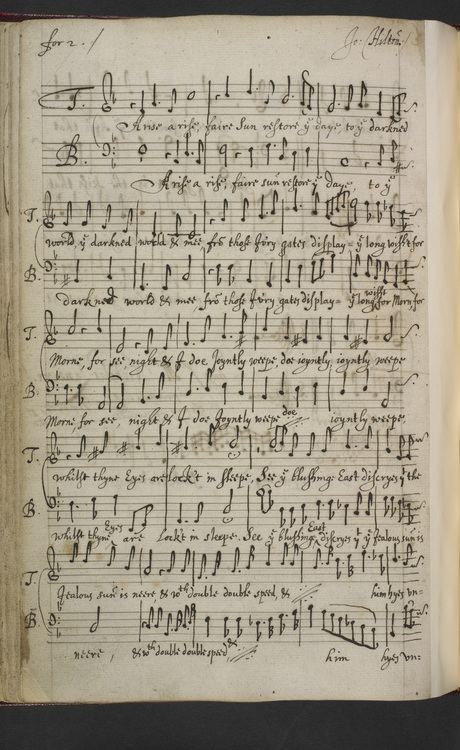
Manuscript of Hilton's duet "Arise, fair sun"

=== Catch That Catch Can ===
Catch That Catch Can was published by John Playford in 1652 and featured experiments in the catch musical form. It was reprinted in 1658 "with large additions." It was again republished in 1667 with the sub-title "The Musical Companion"; and also in 1672–1673. The diarist Samuel Pepys owned a copy of the 1667 edition and enjoyed it, writing on April 15, 1667, "Playford’s new Catch-book ... hath a great many new fooleries in it." A few days later, he wrote, "[I] tried two or three grace parts in Playford’s new book, my wife pleasing me in singing her part of the things she knew, which is a comfort to my very heart."

=== Ayres or Fa-Las for Three Voices ===
This book of music is largely overlooked by scholars. Many think the pieces are of low quality, while others are surprised that they do not get more attention. It is not known who composed the texts to the Ayres or Fa-Las. Most of the songs are about love. Published in 1627, it represented one of the last publications of English song until John Playford's Musical Banquet of 1651 (the one exception being Walter Porter's Madrigales and Ayres of 1632).
