= John Hilton the elder =

English countertenor, organist and composer

John Hilton (the elder) (1565 – 1609(?)) was an English countertenor, organist and composer of mainly sacred works.

== Works ==
Hilton is best known for his anthems "Lord, for Thy Tender Mercy's Sake" and "Call to Remembrance", both of which have also been attributed to Richard Farrant. In the case of the former, the Oxford Easy Anthem Book of 1939 noted, "This anthem has been attributed to Richard Farrant, but his name was never associated with it till late in the 18th century. The earlier MSS agree in ascribing it to the elder John Hilton, of Trinity College, Cambridge, and there is no good reason to doubt that he was the composer."

== Life ==
Hilton was born in 1565. By 1584 he was a countertenor at Lincoln Cathedral. At the start of 1594 he became organist at Trinity College, Cambridge.

He was the father of John Hilton the younger, also a composer, which makes definitive assignation of their combined sacred works problematic; whereas his only secular work appears to have been the madrigal Fair Oriana, beauty's Queen, which he wrote for The Triumphs of Oriana.

He died, probably in Cambridge, prior to 20 March 1609.
