= Jack Hilton (footballer) =

English footballer

Personal information
- Full name: John Hilton
- Date of birth: 20 February 1925
- Place of birth: Rochdale, Lancashire, England
- Date of death: 26 May 2007 (aged 82)
- Place of death: Rochdale, Greater Manchester, England
- Position: Forward

Senior career*
Years	Team	Apps	(Gls)
1949–1950	Hyde United	29	(27)
1950–1951	Wrexham	3	(0)
- Hyde United
- * Club domestic league appearances and goals

John Hilton (20 February 1925 - 26 May 2007) was an English professional footballer who played as a forward. He made three appearances in the English football League with Wrexham. He also played for Hyde United, where in the 1949–50 season, he scored 27 goals in 29 league games.
