= Walter Porter =

English composer (c.1587–1659)

Walter Porter (c.1587–1659) was an English composer and church musician. He travelled to Italy to study under Monteverdi, and shows Italian influence in madrigals and his one surviving anthem.

== Life ==
He was son of Henry Porter, who was musician of the sackbuts to James I. Walter. He was on 5 January 1616 sworn a gentleman of the Chapel Royal, to await a vacancy among the tenor singers; and on 1 February 1617 he succeeded Peter Wright.

In 1639, Porter was appointed master of the choristers of Westminster Abbey, Richard Portman being organist at the time. Among his patrons were John Digby, 1st Earl of Bristol, to whom he dedicated his Ayres. Dismissed from his post during the First English Civil War, Porter was supported by Sir Edward Spencer.

Porter was buried at St. Margaret's Church, Westminster, on 30 November 1659.

== Works ==
Porter's printed works are:

- Madrigales and Ayres of two, three, foure, and five voyces, with the continued bass, with Toccatos, Sinfonias, and Ritornelles to them after the manner of consort musique. To be performed with the Harpsechord, Lutes, Theorbos, Basse-violl, two Violins or two Viols, printed by William Stansby, 1632. The book contains 26 pieces.
- Ayres and Madrigals … with a thorough-bass base for the Organ or Theorbo-lute in the Italian way, 1639.
- Mottets of two voices for treble or tenor and bass, to be performed to an Organ, Harpsycon, Lute, or Bass-viol, 1657. Charles Burney found the words of some of these were taken from George Sandys's Paraphrase.
- Divine Hymns by W. Porter, advertised by John Playford, 1664, perhaps identical with Psalms of Sir George Sands, translation for two voices by Walter Porter, three books, advertised 1671.

Words of anthems set by Porter are in the Harleian MSS.
