= Edmond Baird =

Edmond Baird (9 July 1802 – 22 February 1859) was a cabinet-maker and upholsterer and achieved recognition as one of the best in British North America.

== Life ==
Edmund was born and trained in Scotland and came to Montreal where he quickly gained recognition as part of a partnership with John Hilton.

In May 1833, he began partnering with John Hilton, giving him immediate prominence in the cabinet trade in Montreal. They advertised furniture in the "modern style," which at the time, included Grecian style, and in the early 1840s, Gothic and Elizabethan styles as well. They often used rosewood or mahogany. Among customers were Quebec merchant J. Benjamin, Abraham Joseph of H. Joseph and Company. An arsonist set two fires in February 1843 which caused damage to their company, but Hilton and Baird continued to produce furniture.

Hilton by 1845 wished to go into partnership with his own son, and on May 17, 1845, he dissolved the partnership he had with Baird, who retained the premises on Place d'Armes, went into his own business. One of his early commissions was from the Christian Unitarian Society of Montreal, with Baird hired to do the pew linings, some draperies, and a large wall hanging for the church they opened in 1845, which was the first Unitarian church in Canada.

== Personal life ==
He married Anne Robinson in Montreal on December 21, 1833. They had a number of children. He was affiliated with the Methodist church, attending St James Street Methodist Church. His daughter Emmaline Edmond married a Methodist clergyman in 1860. His grandson, Edmond Baird Ryckman, in 1926 was federal minister of public works.
