= John Hilton (manufacturer) =

- Born: c. 1791; England
- Died: 19 June 1866; Montreal, Canada East
- Occupation: Furniture manufacturer

John Hilton, (c. 1791 – 19 June 1866), was an English-born furniture manufacturer who is known to have been active in Montreal by 1808. He became one of the most successful businessmen in the city and the quality and quantity of his product gave confidence and impetus to a developing Canadian industry. His partner for a time, Edmond Baird, was an important artisan in this competitive business.
