= List of people from London, Ontario =

Notable people from London, Ontario

This is a list of notable people who were born in, residents of, or are otherwise connected to the city of London, Ontario. A person from London is referred to as a Londoner.

== A-B ==
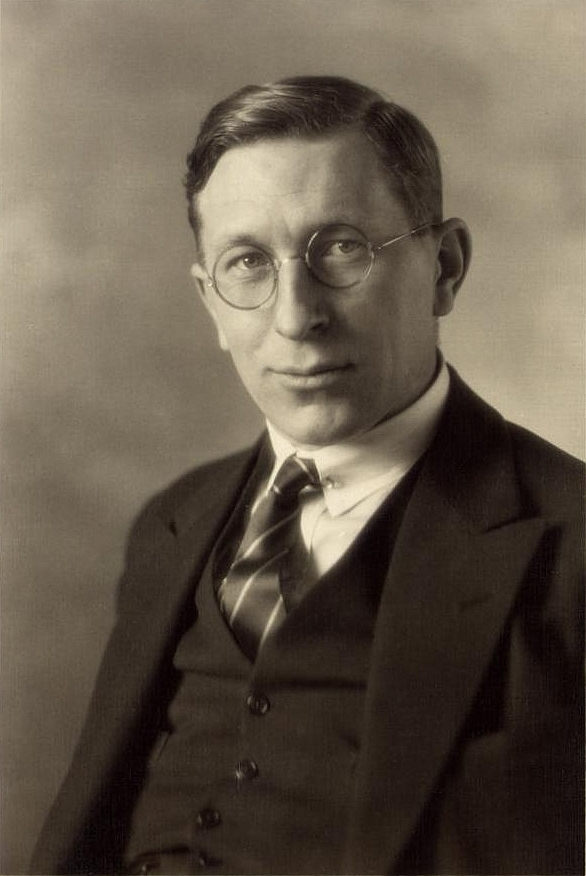
Frederick Banting

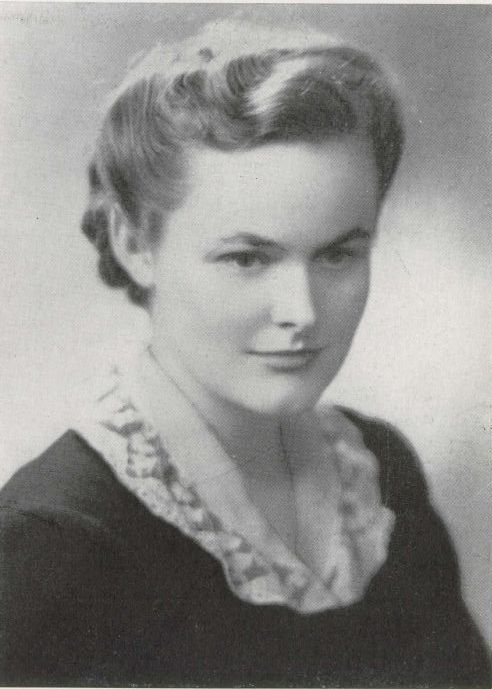
Damjana Bratuž

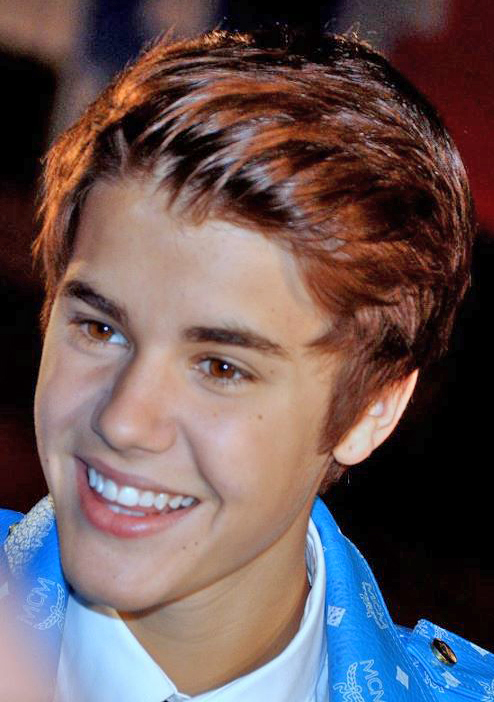
Justin Bieber

- Kelley Armstrong (born 1968), author of fantasy fiction
- Philip Aziz (1923–2009), painter and sculptor
- R. Scott Bakker (born 1967), author of fantasy fiction
- Karen Dianne Baldwin (born 1963), Miss Universe 1982
- Frederick Banting (1891–1941), co-discoverer of insulin
- Joan Barfoot (born 1946), novelist
- John Davis Barnett (1848–1926), curator-librarian
- Joe Bartoch (born 1983), Olympic swimmer
- Helen Battle (1903–1994), marine biologist
- Adam Beck (1857–1925), mayor of London, principal founder of Ontario Hydro
- Marc Bell, cartoonist
- Tom Benner, sculptor and painter
- Zachary Bennett, actor and musician
- Justin Bieber (born 1994), singer, songwriter, and actor
- Craig Richard Billington, NHL player and executive
- Victoria Grace Blackburn, journalist and writer
- Trevor Blumas, actor
- Bill Brady, broadcast journalist and media executive, Member of the Order of Canada, former national director of The Canadian Heart & Stroke Foundation
- Greg Brady, one-time sports radio personality, now at CFIQ
- Damjana Bratuž (1927 –2025), a Slovenian pianist, music educator, and university professor
- Eve Brodlique (1867–1949), British-born Canadian/American author, journalist
- Chase Brown and Sydney Brown, identical twin NFL players, Chase for the Cincinnati Bengals and Sydney for the Atlanta Falcons. In 2024, they became the first Canadian identical twins to play against each other in the NFL.
- Josh Brown, NHL player for the Arizona Coyotes
- Jacob Bryson, NHL player for the Buffalo Sabres
- Richard Maurice Bucke, psychiatrist and author

== C-D ==
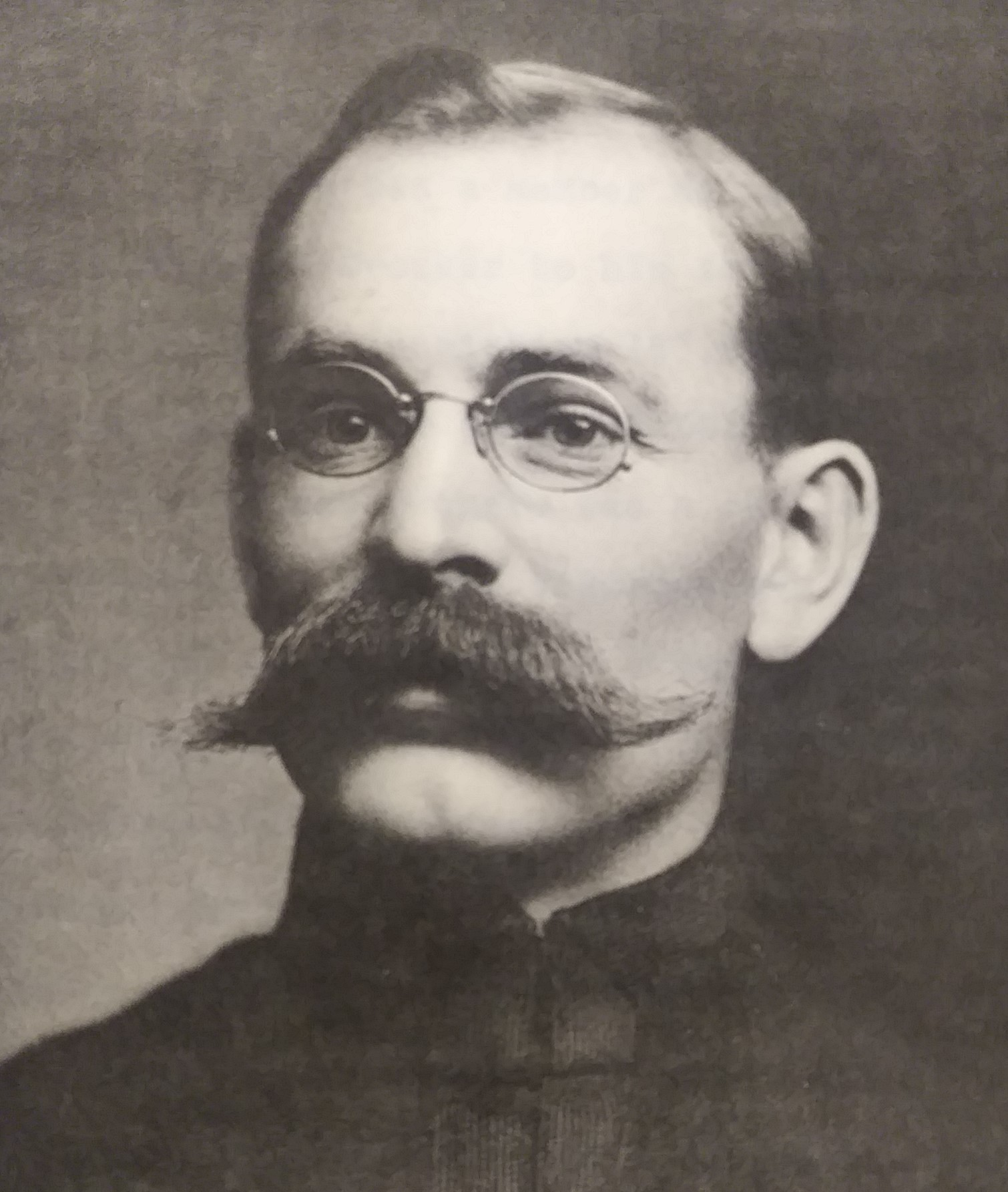
John Howard Crocker

- Gregory Campbell, retired NHL player and hockey executive with Charlotte Checkers
- John Carling, politician
- Jeff Carter, NHL forward for the Pittsburgh Penguins
- Eleanor Catton, author, winner of 2013 Man Booker Prize
- Jack Chambers, painter and filmmaker
- Margaret Chan, former director-general of the World Health Organization
- John H. Chapman, physicist and architect of the Canadian space program
- Al and Charles Christie, Canadian pioneers in early Hollywood who built their own film studio
- Warren Christie, television and film actor, known for role as Ray Cataldo on the ABC drama October Road and as Aidan "Greggy" Stiviletto on the ABC series Happy Town
- Nicole Coenen, author, social media influencer, and lumberjack
- Frank Colman, pro baseball player in 1940s with Pittsburgh Pirates and New York Yankees; co-founded Eager Beaver Baseball Association in 1955
- Patrick Colovin, president of the university University of Notre Dame
- Ward Cornell, host of Hockey Night in Canada
- Logan Couture, NHL forward and Captain for the San Jose Sharks
- J. Howard Crocker, educator and sports executive with the YMCA, the University of Western Ontario, and the Amateur Athletic Union of Canada
- Hume Cronyn, Sr., politician
- Hume Cronyn, actor
- Greg Curnoe, visual artist and member of the Nihilist Spasm Band, and author
- Lolita Davidovich, actress, voice actress
- Chris Daw, gold medalist in Turin 2006 Paralympics; wheelchair curling (skip)
- John Dearness, botanist, mycologist, and educator
- Dylan DeMelo, NHL hockey player
- Dylan De Melo, soccer player
- Laura Dennis, professional wrestler better known as Cherry Bomb
- Peter Desbarats, former Global TV anchor, author, former dean of the Graduate School of Journalism at the University of Western Ontario
- Alexander Dewdney, mathematician
- Christopher Dewdney, poet and writer
- Selma Diamond (1920–1985), actress, TV show Night Court
- Brett Dier, actor
- Annie Le Porte Diggs (1853–1916), writer, temperance worker, and Populist advocate
- Chris Doty (1966–2006), award-winning documentary filmmaker, author and playwright
- Drew Doughty, NHL defenseman with the Los Angeles Kings
- Michael Dowse, film director
- George F. Durand (1850–1889), architect

== E-J ==
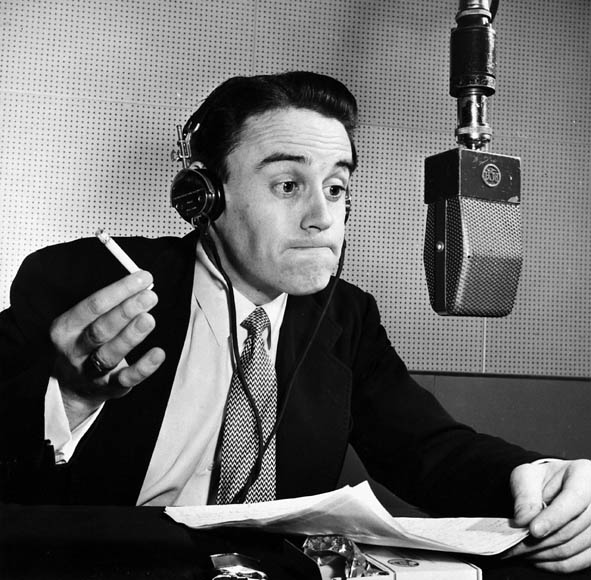
Max Ferguson

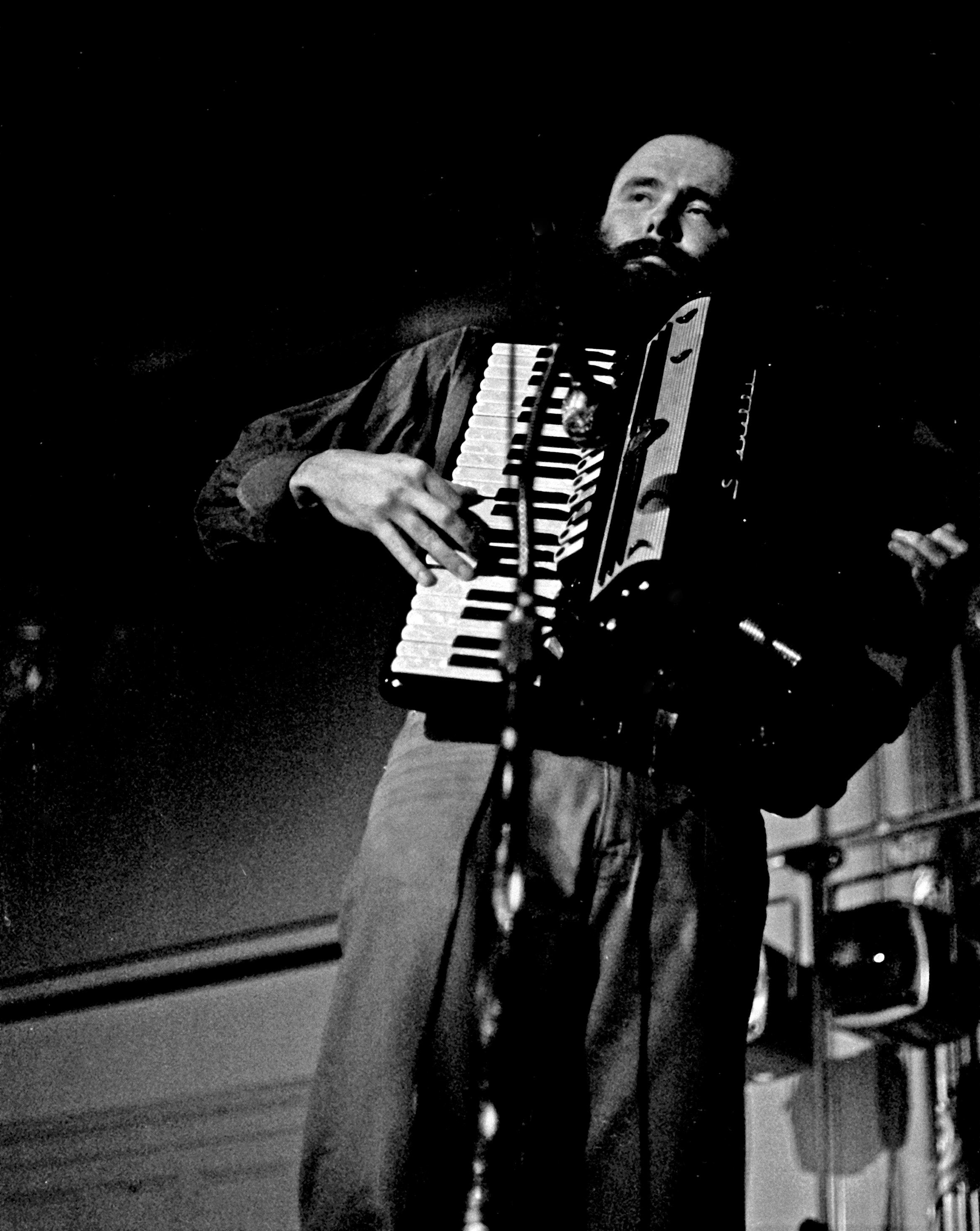
Garth Hudson

- Emanuel, rhythm and blues singer
- Marc Emery, marijuana activist and libertarian
- Paterson Ewen, painter
- Robert W. Fassold, 29th Canadian Surgeon General
- Murray Favro, artist and musician in the Nihilist Spasm Band
- Bob Ferguson, sports journalist and writer
- Max Ferguson, CBC radio and TV personality, 1950s and 1960s
- Jessie Fleming, player on the Canada Women's National Soccer Team, Olympic Gold Medalist
- Charley Fox, Royal Canadian Air Force Flight Lieutenant credited with strafing German field marshal Erwin Rommel's car and seriously injuring him in the process
- Sam Gagner, former ice hockey player
- Victor Garber, actor
- George Georgallidis, professional gamer
- Shuman Ghosemajumder, entrepreneur and author
- Ted Giannoulas, player of the San Diego Chicken mascot
- George Gibson (Mooney) (1880–1967), catcher, Pittsburgh Pirates, won the World Series in 1909; manager in MLB
- Julia Gosling, professional women's ice hockey player
- Nicole Gosling, professional women's ice hockey player
- Ryan Gosling, actor
- Jerry Grafstein, lawyer
- O. E. L. "Bud" Graves, artist and painter/sculptor
- Jeff Hackett, former NHL hockey goaltender
- Matt Hackett, nephew of Jeff, NHL goaltender in 2010s.
- Paul Haggis, TV and film writer, director and producer
- Jeremy Hansen, astronaut
- Richard Berry Harrison (1864–1935), groundbreaking Black actor
- Gary Harvey, director television and producer
- Jamelie Hassan, artist
- Frank Hawley (b. 1954), two-time world champion drag racing driver
- Robert Hall Haynes (1931–1998), scientist, first chair of the Department of Biology at York University, who coined the term ecopoeisis
- William C. Heine, author and newspaper editor
- Andrew Herr, actor
- Mark Hominick (b. 1982), mixed martial artist
- Chris Horodecki (b. 1987), mixed martial artist
- Bo Horvat, NHL player
- Garth Hudson, keyboard player in The Band
- Kenneth Adams Hunter, 17th and 20th Canadian Surgeon General
- Tommy Hunter, country singer and television host
- J.D. Jackson, physicist
- Doug Jarrett, former NHL defenceman (ret. 1976)
- Joseph Jeffery (1829–1894), banker
- Jenny Jones, TV talk show host

== K-M ==
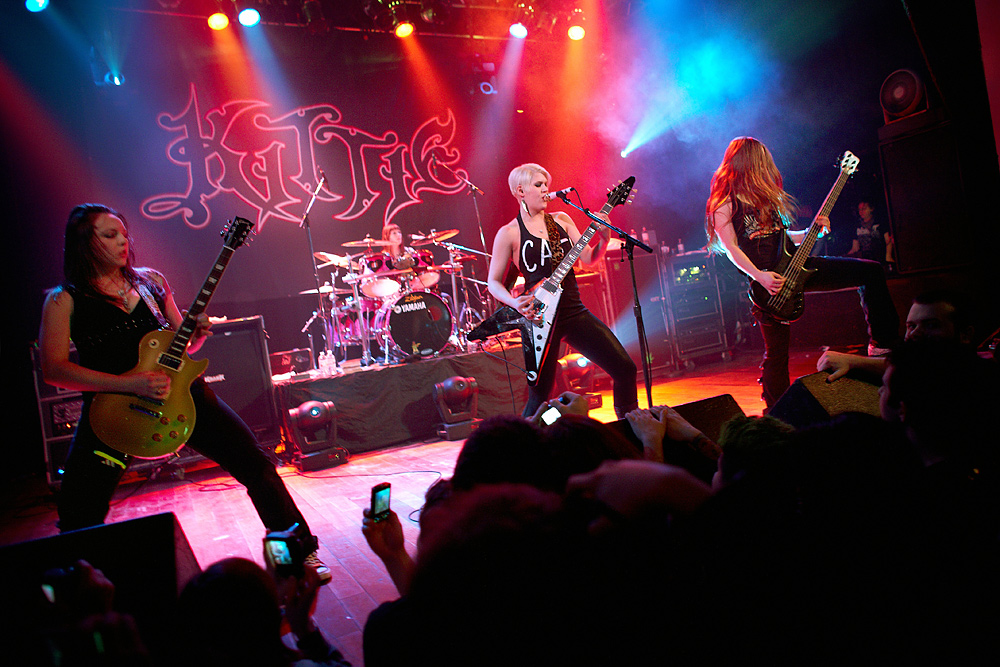
Kittie

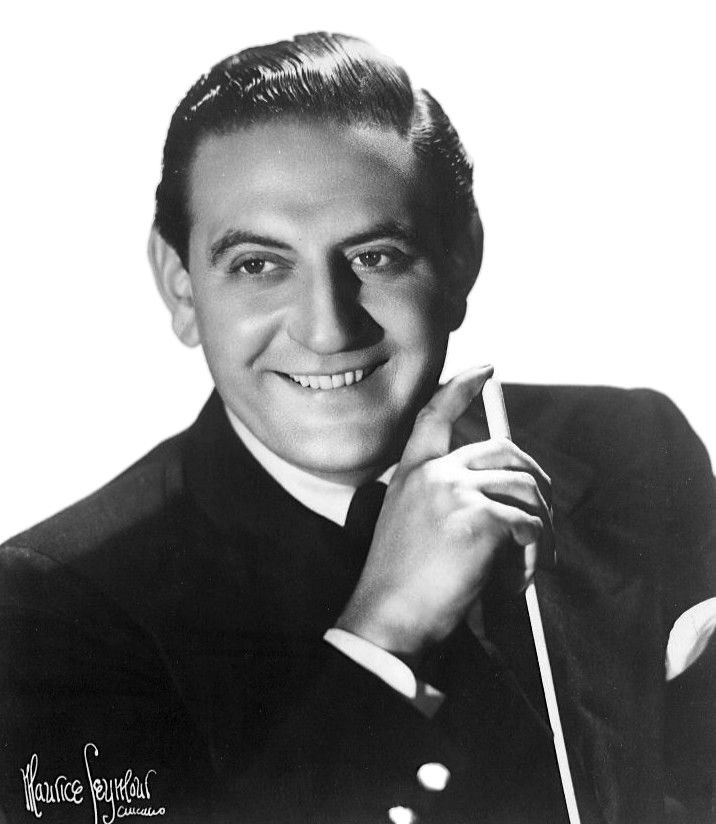
Guy Lombardo

- Nazem Kadri, NHL centre with the Calgary flames
- John Kapelos, character actor, frequently featured in John Hughes' films
- Ingrid Kavelaars, actress
- Penn Kemp, writer and former poet laureate of London
- Kittie, all-female heavy metal band
- Travis Konecny, NHL forward with the Philadelphia Flyers
- John Labatt, pioneer brewer
- Sarah Lafleur, actress and voice actress
- Cecil Lean, actor, lyricist, composer, singer
- Graham Lear, drummer
- Brett Lindros, former NHL hockey forward, brother of Eric Lindros
- Eric Lindros, Hockey Hall of Fame member, drafted 1st overall in the 1991 Entry Draft by Quebec, brother of Brett Lindros
- John William Little, businessman and former mayor of London
- Gene Lockhart, actor
- Lawrence Loh, physician and Medical Officer of Health for the Region of Peel during the COVID-19 pandemic
- Guy Lombardo, bandleader and violinist
- Carmen Lombardo, saxophonist, singer, and songwriter
- Lebert Lombardo, trumpeter
- Victor Lombardo, musician and brother of Guy Lombardo
- Donald Luce, NHL player, executive, and scout.
- Luke Macfarlane, actor
- Maggie Mac Neil, swimmer and Olympic gold medalist
- Craig MacTavish, NHL hockey player, and Edmonton Oilers head coach and GM (2000–2015)
- Sam Maggs, author and comic book and video game writer (b. 1988)
- Joseph Marks, labour activist and creator of the newspaper the Industrial Banner
- Brad Marsh, former NHL defenceman (ret. 1993)
- Amber Marshall, actress
- Vaughn Martin, 2009 draft pick by the NFL's San Diego Chargers
- Rachel McAdams, actress
- Emilia McCarthy, actress
- Rob McConnell, Music Hall of Fame jazz musician of Boss Brass fame
- Cody McCormick, retired NHL player from the Buffalo Sabres
- Roy McDonald, poet, diarist, local street-person and personality
- David McLellan, Olympic freestyle swimmer
- Tammy McLeod, boccia player
- Charles Meredith, President of the Montreal Stock Exchange, 1902
- John Walsingham Cooke Meredith, father of the "Eight London Merediths"
- Richard Martin Meredith, founder of The University of Western Ontario, president of the High Court of the Supreme Court of Ontario, and chief justice of the Ontario Court of Common Pleas
- Thomas Graves Meredith, president of Canada Life Assurance Company, lawyer
- Vincent Meredith, president of the Bank of Montreal
- William Ralph Meredith, chief justice of Ontario, chancellor of the University of Toronto, and leader of the Ontario Conservatives
- Orlo Miller, author
- Evan van Moerkerke, Olympic swimmer at the 2016 Summer Olympics
- Scott Moir, figure skater
- John Mackenzie Moore, architect and mayor of London (1926–1927)
- Simeon Morrill (1793–1871), mayor of London
- Trevor Morris, Emmy award winning composer and music producer

== N-P ==
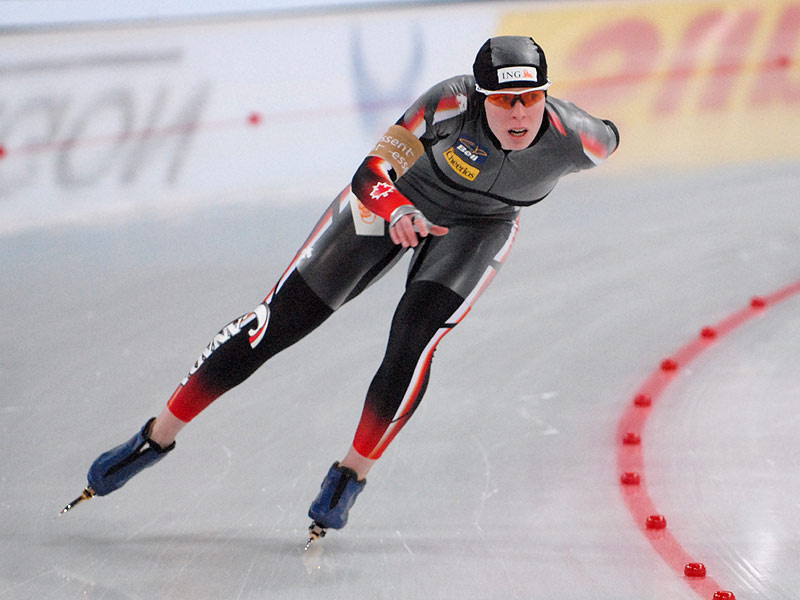
Christine Nesbitt

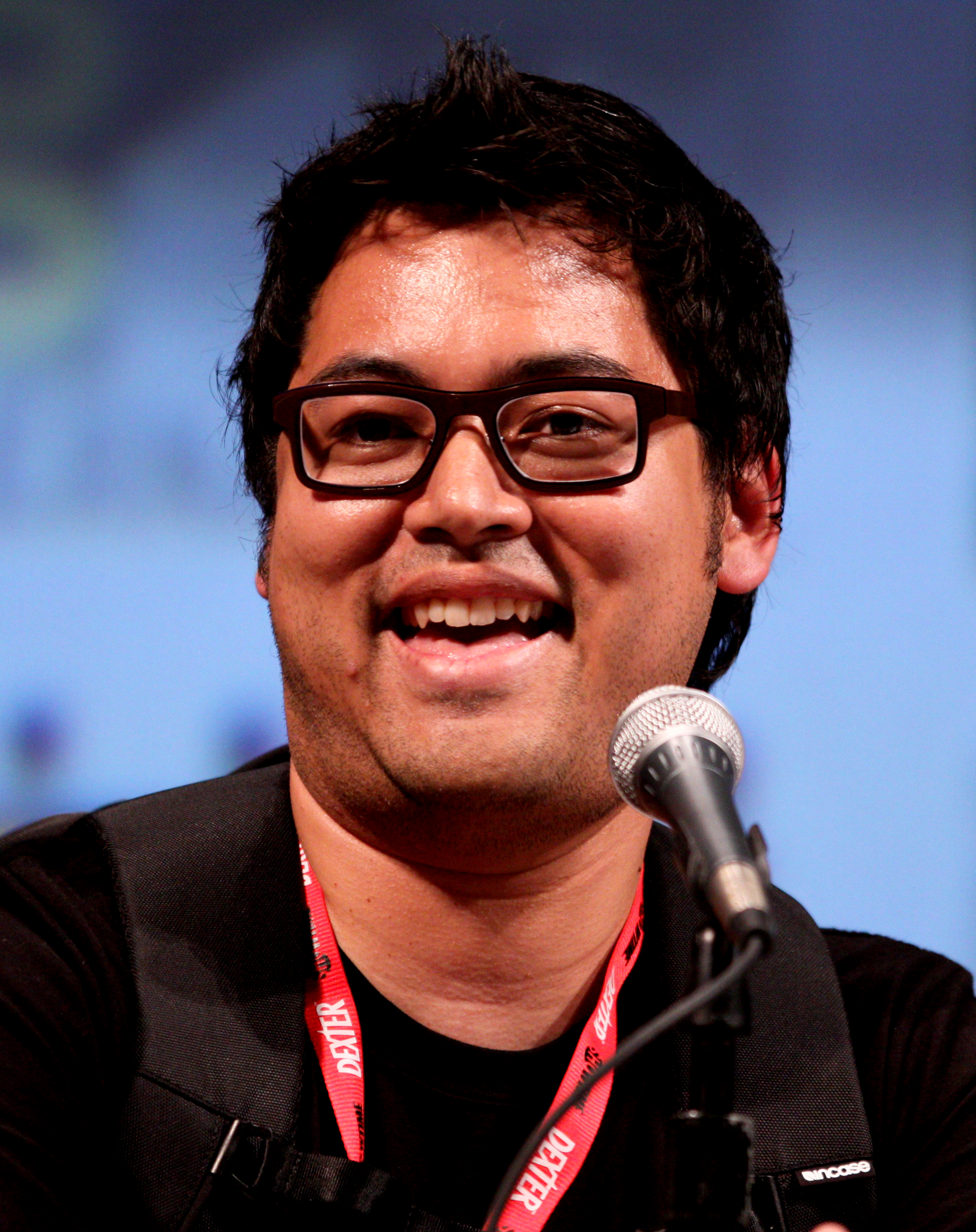
Bryan Lee O'Malley

- Kate Nelligan, actress
- Christine Nesbitt, Olympic gold and silver medal-winning speed-skater (women's 1000m, and women's team pursuit, respectively)
- Bert and Joe Niosi (brothers), band members of radio's Happy Gang
- Ocean, Christian folk rock band
- Bryan Lee O'Malley, comic book artist and writer, award-winning cartoonist and creator of Scott Pilgrim
- Megan Park, actress
- Casey Patton, boxer
- Paul Peel, painter
- David Peterson, Premier of Ontario, 1985–1990
- Ed Pien, artist
- Chris Potter, actor
- Chad Price, singer-songwriter
- Skip Prokop, rock drummer and songwriter, founder of the band Lighthouse
- Brandon Prust, former NHL forward.

== R-S ==
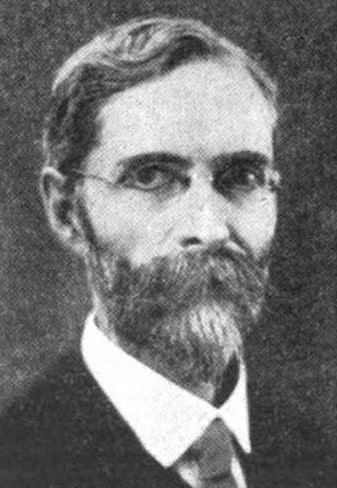
Charles Edward Saunders

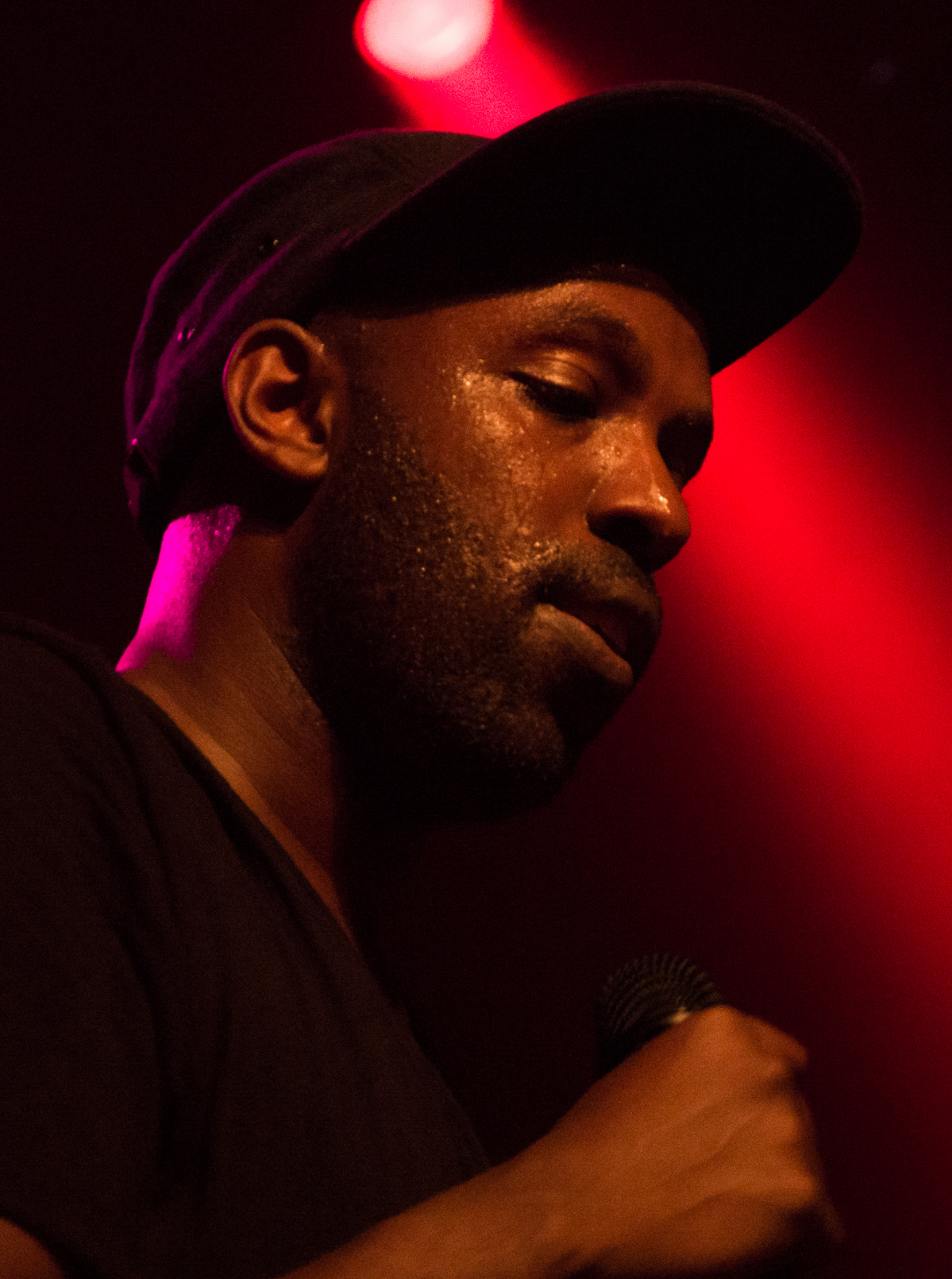
Shad

- Jack Richardson, award-winning record producer, Lifetime Achievement Juno Award recipient, Order of Canada recipient, and educator at Fanshawe College
- Michael Riley, television actor
- John P. Robarts, premier of Ontario, 1961–1971
- Jesse Ronson, professional mixed martial artist
- Ryan Roobroeck, hockey player
- Vic Roschkov Sr., newspaper editorial cartoonist/illustrator
- Jacob Ruby, football player Edmonton Eskimos
- J. Philippe Rushton, researcher and academician at University of Western Ontario
- Morley Safer, journalist
- Charles Edward Saunders, agricultural scientist, principal developer of Marquis wheat
- William Saunders, agricultural scientist, founder of Canada's Experimental Farm system
- Brett Seney, hockey player
- Shad, hip-hop musician
- Shaedon Sharpe, NBA player for the Portland Trail Blazers
- David Shore, television writer best known for House
- Christine Simpson, sports broadcaster, and sibling of Craig and Dave,
- Craig Simpson, NHL player, coach, and broadcaster.
- Dave Simpson, hockey player with the London Knights and professor at the Richard Ivey School of Business
- George Sipos, writer
- Jason Slaughter, creator of urbanist YouTube channel Not Just Bikes
- Meaghan Smith, singer-songwriter
- Timothy Snelgrove, founder of Timothy's World Coffee
- Ross Somerville, six-time Canadian Amateur Championship winner in golf, first Canadian to win U.S. Amateur in 1932
- Clara Sorrenti, Twitch streamer and transgender activist
- Jonny Staub, radio personality
- Barry Steers, Canadian Ambassador to Brazil (1971–1976), High Commissioner to Bermuda (1976–1979), Ambassador to Japan (1981–1989)
- Janaya Stephens, actress, star of the Left Behind movie series
- Adam Stern, Major League Baseball player with the Baltimore Orioles
- Jude St. John, veteran, all-star player with Toronto Argonauts
- Lara St. John, violinist
- Scott St. John, violinist and violist
- Sam Stout, Ultimate Fighting Championship competitor
- David Suzuki, geneticist, environmentalist, writer and broadcaster
- Nick Suzuki, NHL player for the Montreal Canadiens
- Ryan Suzuki, NHL prospect for the Carolina Hurricanes, with the Chicago Wolves

== T-Z ==
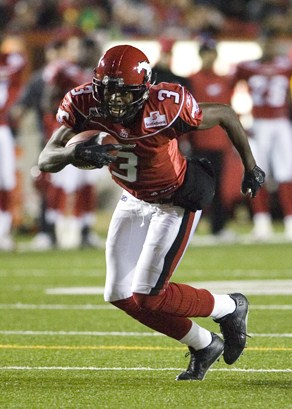
Ryan Thelwell

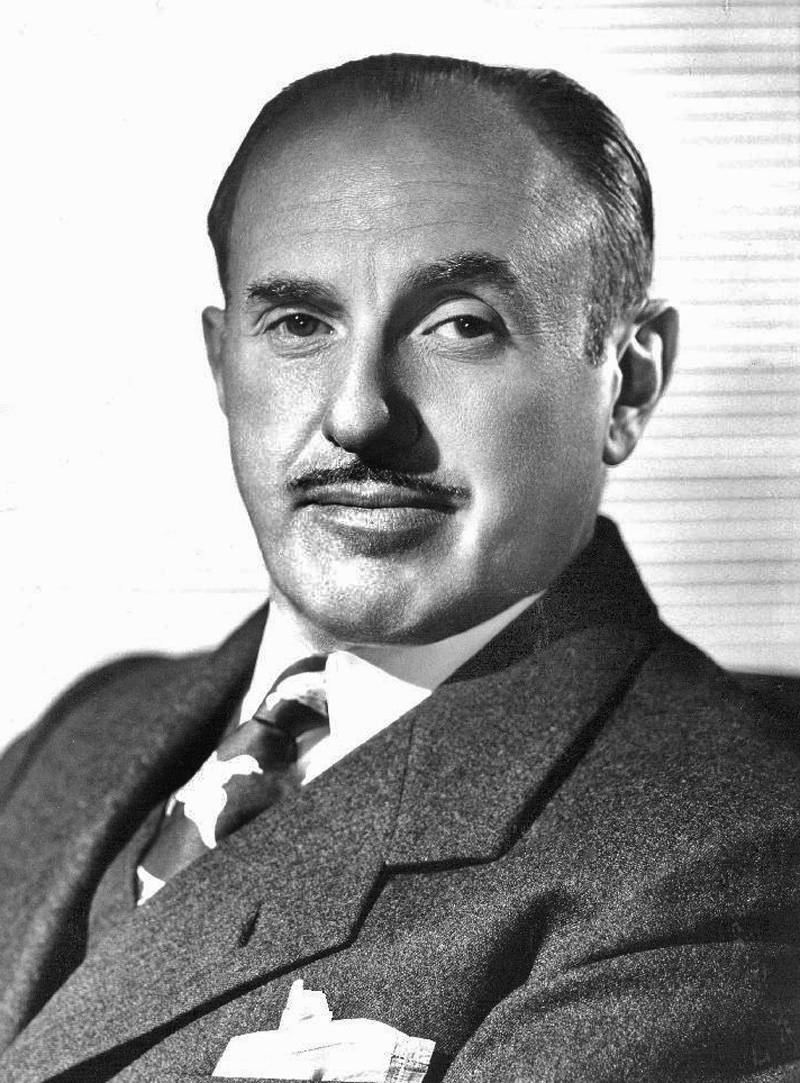
Jack L. Warner

- Salli Terri, mezzo-soprano
- Merle Tingley, cartoonist
- Ryan Thelwell, former National Football League player with San Diego Chargers and Pittsburgh Steelers, 3 time Grey Cup Champion BC Lions and Calgary Stampeders
- Thine Eyes Bleed, metal band featuring Johnny Araya, brother of Slayer bassist and vocalist Tom Araya
- Jim Thompson, businessman, philanthropist, and sportsman
- Scott Thornton, former NHL player (ret. 2008)
- Tim Tindale, former American football player with Buffalo Bills and Chicago Bears
- Five of the six Tolpuddle Martyrs, convicted in England for forming the first trade union there, settled in London
- Thomas Henry Tracy, architect and engineer
- Jason Tunks, Olympian, discus thrower
- Mike Van Ryn, retired NHL player and Assistant Coach with St. Louis Blues.
- Tessa Virtue, figure skater
- Brian Vollmer, lead singer of Helix
- Jolene Van Vugt, first woman to perform a backflip on a dirt bike
- Shannon Walsh, documentary filmmaker
- Damian Warner, Gold Medal Olympian from the 2020 Summer Olympics in the Men's Decathlon
- Jack L. Warner, co-founder of Warner Brothers Studios
- Colton White, NHL player for the Anaheim Ducks
- Jeff Willmore, visual and performance artist
- Tomasz Winnicki, white supremacist, antisemite and subject of complaints before the Canadian Human Rights Tribunal
- Marion Woodman, Jungian and feminist writer
- Sarah Rowell Wright (1862–1930), temperance reformer, newspaper editor, suffragist
- Shelina Zadorsky, member of the Canadian Women's National Soccer Team, Bronze Olympic Medalist
- Jessica Zelinka, former Olympic athlete (heptathlon).
