= Meredith baronets =

Extinct baronetcy in the Baronetage of the United Kingdom

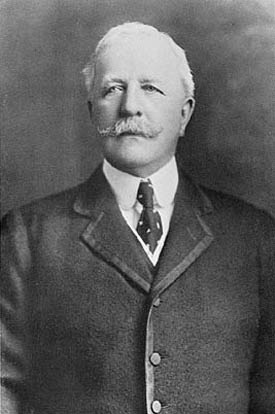
Sir Vincent Meredith, 1st Baronet

There have been three baronetcies created for persons with the surname Meredith, one in the Baronetage of England, one in the Baronetage of Nova Scotia and one in the Baronetage of the United Kingdom. Two of the creations are extinct while one is dormant.

The Meredith Baronetcy, of Stansty in the County of Denbigh, was created in the Baronetage of England on 13 August 1622 for Sir William Meredith Kt., of Leeds Abbey, Kent; Treasurer and Paymaster of the Army under Elizabeth I and James I. The second Baronet sat as member of parliament for Kent and Sandwich. The fifth Baronet was member of parliament for Kent. The title became extinct on the death of the third son of the second Baronet in 1739. Thomas Meredith, a younger son of the second Baronet, briefly represented Kent in Parliament in 1701.

The Meredith Baronetcy, of Marston in the County of Devon, was created in the Baronetage of Nova Scotia on 2 January 1639 for Amos Meredith, Gentleman of the Privy Chamber in Extraordinary to Charles I and Commissioner of the Customs and Excise in Ireland. The third Baronet was a politician and served as Comptroller of the Household from 1774 to 1777. The title became dormant on his death in 1790.

The Meredith Baronetcy, of Montreal in the Dominion of Canada, was created in the Baronetage of the United Kingdom on 14 November 1916 for the Canadian banker and philanthropist Vincent Meredith. The title became extinct on his death in 1929. Meredith was the son of John Walsingham Cooke Meredith and the brother of Sir William Ralph Meredith, Richard Martin Meredith, Thomas Graves Meredith and Charles Meredith.

== Meredith baronets, of Stansty (1622) ==
Escutcheon of the Meredith baronets of Stansty

- Sir William Meredith, 1st Baronet (c. 1596–1675), of Leeds Abbey, Kent
- Sir Richard Meredith, 2nd Baronet (died 1679), of Leeds Abbey, Kent
- Sir William Meredith, 3rd Baronet (c. 1666–1681)
- Sir Richard Meredith, 4th Baronet (died 1723)
- Sir Roger Meredith, 5th Baronet (c. 1677–1738), youngest brother of the 3rd and 4th Baronets

== Meredith baronets, of Marston (1639) ==
- Sir Amos Meredith, 1st Baronet (died 1669)
- Sir William Meredith, 2nd Baronet (1665–1752)
- Sir William Meredith, 3rd Baronet (c. 1725–1790)

== Meredith baronets, of Montreal (1916) ==
- Sir (Henry) Vincent Meredith, 1st Baronet (1850–1929)

== See also ==
- Meredyth baronets
