= Vincent Meredith =

Canadian banker and philanthropist

Sir Vincent Meredith Bt
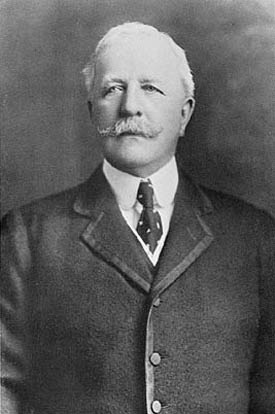
- H. Vincent Meredith, 1915

14th President of the Bank of Montreal
- In office 1913–1927
- Preceded by: Richard B. Angus
- Succeeded by: Sir Charles Gordon

Personal details
- Born: Henry Vincent Meredith; February 28, 1850 London, Upper Canada
- Died: February 24, 1929 (aged 78) Montreal, Quebec
- Resting place: Mount Royal Cemetery
- Spouse: Isabella Brenda Allan
- Relations: John Walsingham Cooke Meredith (father); Sir William Ralph Meredith (brother); Richard Martin Meredith (brother); Thomas Graves Meredith (brother); Charles Meredith (brother); Frederick Edmund Meredith (second cousin)
- Occupation: Banker, philanthropist

Sir Henry Vincent Meredith, 1st Baronet (February 28, 1850 – February 24, 1929), was a Canadian banker and philanthropist. He was president of the Bank of Montreal, the Royal Victoria Hospital and the Montreal Museum of Fine Arts. He was governor of McGill University and on the board of the Canadian Pacific Railway. His home in Montreal's Golden Square Mile was made a National Historic Site of Canada in 1990 and is today part of McGill University, named Lady Meredith House for his wife.

== Family ==
(Henry) Vincent Meredith was born in London, Ontario, the fifth son of John Walsingham Cooke Meredith and Sarah Pegler. One of his great-uncles, Boyle Meredith (1788–1873), married Eliza Gough Vincent (1797–1870), a niece of General John Vincent and a cousin of Hugh Gough, 1st Viscount Gough. It was after her family that he was given his middle name, which he chose to use as his first. He was one of a group of brothers collectively referred to as 'The Eight London Merediths'. They included Sir William Ralph Meredith, Chief Justice Richard Martin Meredith, Thomas Graves Meredith and Charles Meredith. The Eight London Merediths were close to their cousins Judge Richard Edmund Meredith, Frederick Edmund Meredith, William Archer Redmond and Judge James Creed Meredith.

== Bank of Montreal ==
After an initial education at "a home rich in cultural elements", he briefly attended the Hellmuth Boys College at London, Ontario, before joining the Bank of Montreal as a clerk in 1867. He steadily rose through the ranks to become the first Canadian-born president of the bank from 1913 to 1927. From his retirement until his death two years later, he served as chairman of the board. In Meredith's time, before the creation of the Bank of Canada in 1934, the Bank of Montreal acted as Canada's national bank, and Meredith successfully guided the nation's economy through the First World War.

When Meredith was elected president in 1913, the bank had assets worth $244 million, which had tripled to $831 million when he resigned his presidency in 1927 in favour of Sir Charles Gordon. Along with his cousins – the brothers William Henry Meredith (1849–1895) and Frederick Edmund Meredith – he was one of three Merediths to have attained high position within the bank. As president, Sir Vincent's office was at the bank's headquarters at 119 St. James Street in Montreal, Quebec. When he retired as president of the bank in 1927, The Banker, published in London, England, summed up the effect he had had on Canadian financial affairs during his time at the bank,

It is now sixty years since Sir Vincent Meredith entered the service of the Bank of Montreal, and it is only barely true to say that much of its present power and prosperity is due to his zeal and capacity. To form a just idea of his achievements, it is necessary to take a view of the resources of the Bank of Montreal sixty years ago. It was then a comparatively small bank, with no great influence upon the industrial and financial affairs of Canada. Doubtlessly the main cause of its growth is the extraordinary growth of Canada. Many tell us that no one man, however zealous and competent, can multiply the resources and influence of a bank or of any other business. They tell us the truth. Such mighty work can only be done by a great company of men of divers parts. Many of them must remain in important but inconspicuous employments, receiving little reward for their labors, the chief credit being given to those at the head of affairs. But this does not diminish the work of a man such as Sir Vincent Meredith. All the eminent offices he acquired and holds in the Bank of Montreal were won by no other means than he derived from his native abilities, integrity and constancy. He had little academic education, but he formed his mind and character in the school of a long and complex experience. He has not only grown with Canada, and the Bank of Montreal, but has helped to strengthen and fashion both. There is nothing of more consequence to a nation, a bank, or any other institution than the character of its rulers and leaders. This is especially true of a new country, such as Canada. If any man were asked to account for the influence of Sir Vincent Meredith upon Canadian affairs, he would unhesitatingly ascribe it to rare force of character. When one considers the work of Sir Vincent Meredith, it is impossible to refuse him the praise of being the most eminent of living Canadian bankers

Among many other positions, Vincent Meredith was a member of the Montreal Board of Trade, a member of the board of directors of Canadian Pacific Railway; the Royal Exchange Assurance Co., of London, England; the Royal Trust Assurance Co., of Montreal (also serving as that company's president for a time); the Standard Life Assurance Company of Edinburgh and Dominion Textile. He served as governor of McGill University, president of the Montreal Museum of Fine Arts, and president of the Royal Victoria Hospital. He was created a hereditary Baronet of the United Kingdom by King George V for his wartime services to Canada and the British Empire in 1916.

== Lady Meredith ==
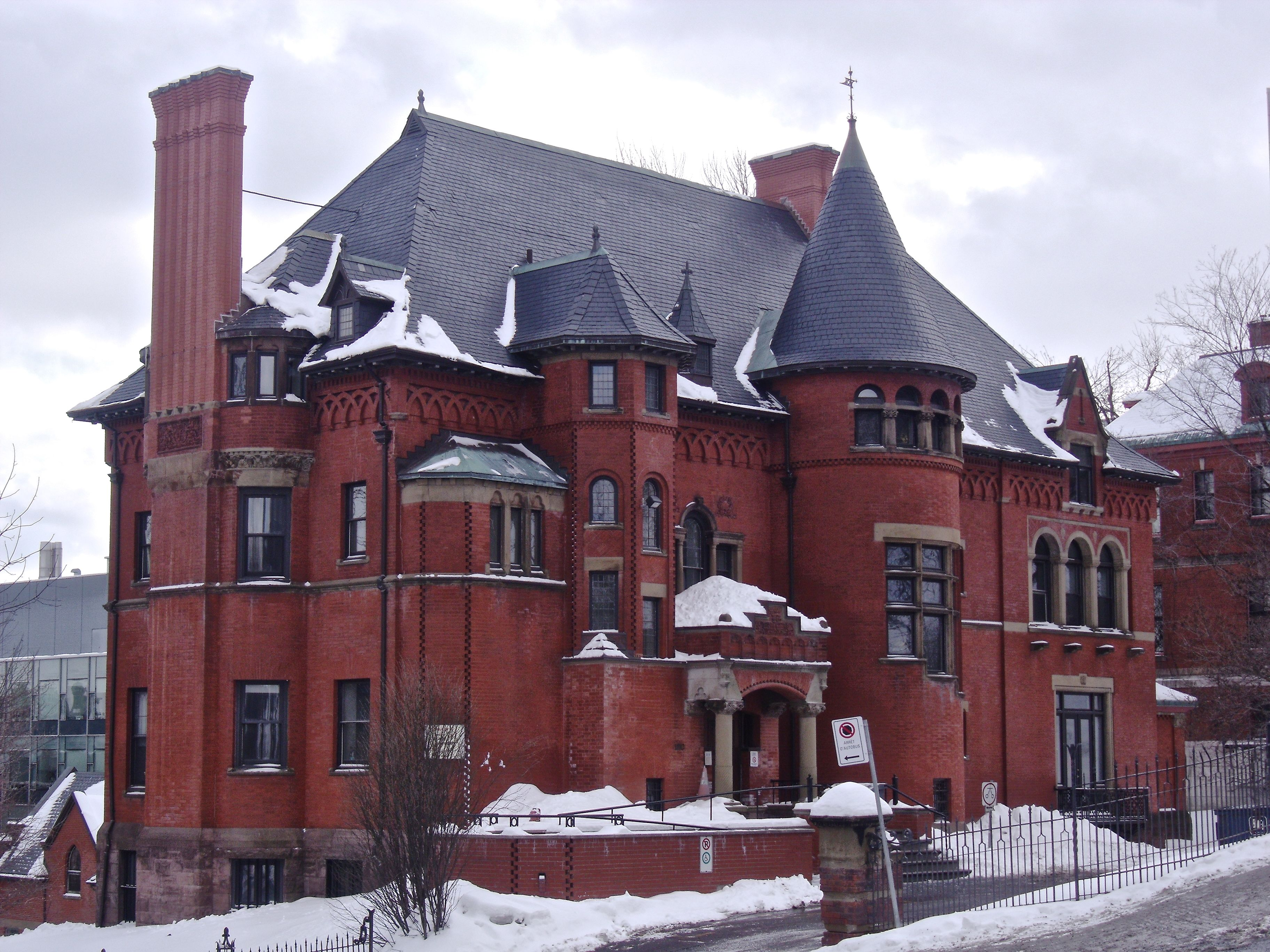
Ardvarna in Montreal

In 1888, Vincent Meredith married (Isabella) Brenda Allan (1867–1959), the youngest daughter of Andrew Allan, who had then succeeded his elder brother, Sir Hugh Allan, as president of the Allan Line and the Merchant's Bank etc. This marriage brought Meredith additional wealth and powerful connections. As a wedding gift, his father-in-law gave him and his wife a parcel of land on the corner of Pine Avenue and Peel Street in the Golden Square Mile, just across from Ravenscrag, where Lady Meredith's cousin, Sir Montagu Allan, lived. In 1894, they employed the architect Edward Maxwell to build them a house there, "Ardvarna", a turreted, red brick mansion, now known as Lady Meredith House. Maxwell had also previously designed their summer house at Mont Saint-Bruno, Quebec. Lady Meredith House was designated a National Historic Site of Canada in 1990. Following the First World War, when wounded Canadian soldiers started to return from the Front in 1918, Lady Meredith set up a rehabilitation centre for officers at her and Vincent's Montreal home. During their 1939 Royal Tour of Canada, Lady Meredith was the hostess to King George VI and Queen Elizabeth The Queen Mother during their stay in Montreal, Quebec. In 1942, Lady Meredith donated the house to the Royal Victoria Hospital, Montreal, as a residence for the nurses.

Brenda Meredith donated the Lady Meredith Cup for the Quebec Ladies' Hockey Association in 1920, the first ice hockey trophy in Canada to be competed for between women in ankle-length skirts. On the 100th anniversary of the Montreal Thistle Curling Club in 1943, the Montreal Gazette of the day reported that on Christmas Eve, 1870, she was "probably the first lady in Canada to put up an iron". She served as president of the Purple Cross (a service for the care of wounded and disabled horses on the battlefield during World War I); president of the Canadian Women's Army Auxiliary Corps; governor of the Royal Victoria's Maternity Hospital; director of the Society for the Prevention of Cruelty to Animals; vice president of the Women's National Immigration Society, and honorary patroness of the Imperial Order Daughters of the Empire with Lady Eugène Fiset and Lady H. Montagu Allan. She was a member and benefactor of the Presbyterian Church of St. Andrew and St. Paul, Montreal, and was one of the founders of the Montreal Ladies Golf Club.

They left no children, but along with Prince Arthur, Duke of Connaught and Strathearn, and George Curzon, 1st Marquess Curzon of Kedleston, Vincent Meredith was the godfather to Robert Henry Arthur Rivers-Bulkeley (1914–2007), son of Colonel Charles Rivers-Bulkeley and Annie Evelyn Pelly. Lady Meredith was the godmother of Frederick Edmund Meredith's only grandson, and the only son of her first cousin, Sir Montagu Allan.

== Philanthropy ==
Sir Vincent Meredith was a generous philanthropist. A founding member of the Canadian Mental Health Association he served on its board of directors and was one of its chief benefactors. In 1909 he gave the Royal Victoria Hospital, Montreal (where he solely sponsored an annual ball for the nurses) an automobile, Canada's first motor ambulance, but as with all his gifts and donations, refused to allow anything of it to be mentioned in the papers. It was also his idea to bring the famous neuro-surgeon Wilder Penfield to the Royal Victoria Hospital. At the Bank of Montreal he introduced the 'Sir Vincent Meredith Fund', which was set up for the female employees of the bank to relieve them in a financial crisis, which is still in operation today. In his will he left just under six hundred thousand dollars to be shared between the Royal Victoria Hospital, McGill University and Bishop's University, Lennoxville. It was said that Sir Vincent took every opportunity to relieve suffering in Montreal and advance that city.

As well as giving financial backing and donations from his own art collection to the Montreal Museum of Fine Arts, he also donated a set of four Louis Comfort Tiffany windows to the museum's new building. In sports, he donated the 'Sir Vincent Meredith Trophy' awarded to the best all-round athlete of the Montreal Amateur Athletic Association, as well as giving the Meredith Cup for the Waltzing Competition held at the Winter Club, and the Meredith Trophy awarded at the Dominion Drama Festival.

== Private life ==
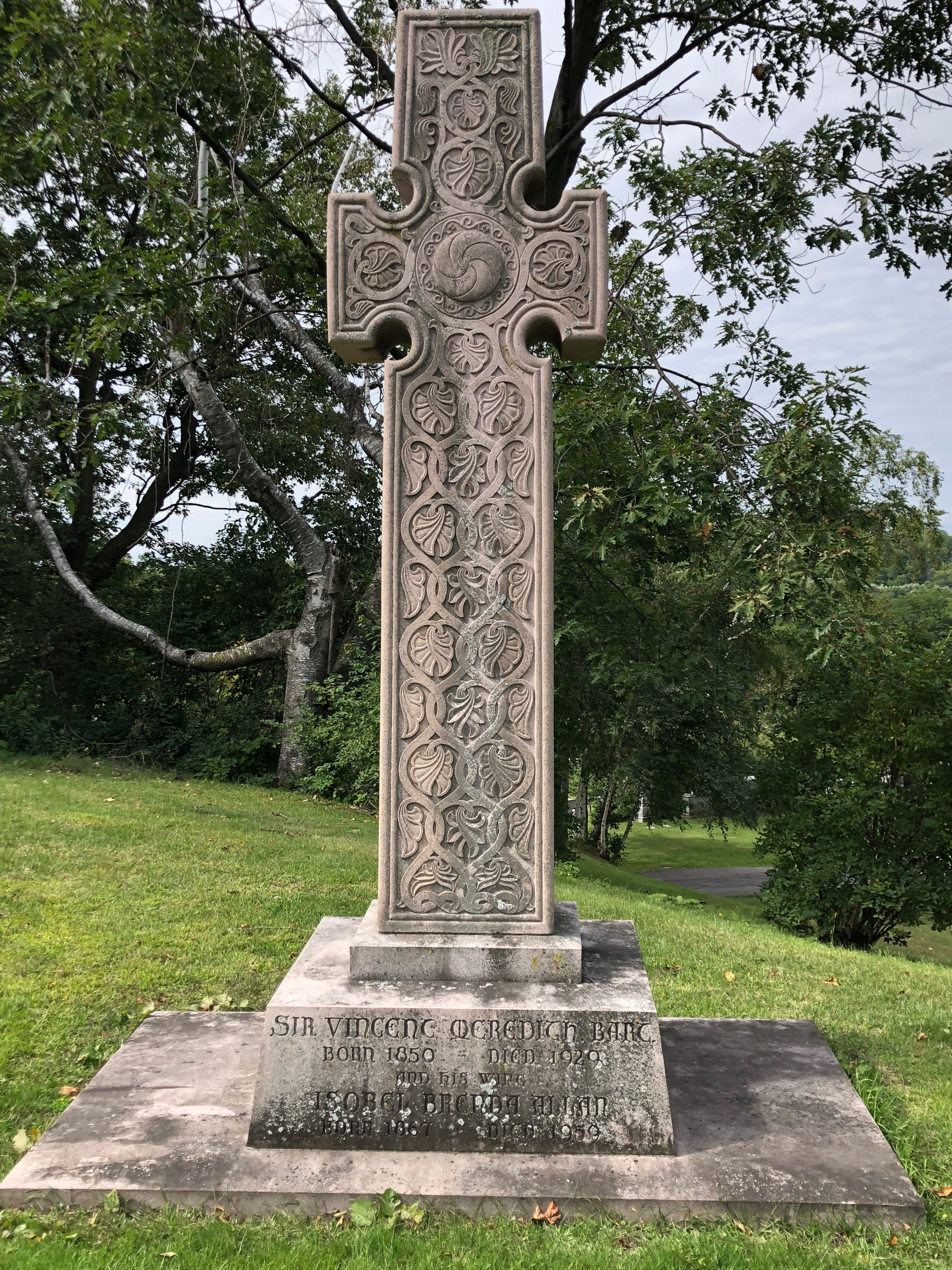
Meredith's funeral monument in Mount Royal Cemetery.

The Merediths shared a passion for horses, and were said to have had a fine eye for them. Vincent rode with the Montreal Hunt, played polo in Senneville, Quebec, and they both imported many fine horses from Ireland and England. His youngest brother, Llewellyn Meredith (1860–1933) J.P., was a highly respected judge at the Olympia, London, Horse Show in England, and also bred his own horses at his farm outside London, Ontario. Sir Vincent was also a keen fisherman. Both he and Lady Meredith had a great interest in music and art and were one of the most enthusiastic supporters of Grand Opera in Montreal, Quebec. He belonged to many clubs in Montreal and England, and he was amongst the founding members of the Mount Royal Club in Montreal, the Ritz-Carlton Montreal Hotel and the Montreal Winter Club. The Montreal Gazette said of him :

Outwardly stern and commanding in appearance, he was really kind-hearted, considerate and tolerant. No situation ever deprived him of his poise. He never gave way to violent anger, preferring the rapier to the bludgeon as a weapon. A flash of his eye and a sarcastic phrase was sufficient to puncture conceit, rebuke stupidity or quell insubordination

Sir Vincent Meredith died in 1929 without children, and thus his short-lived baronetcy became extinct. His wife continued to live in their Montreal home until 1941, when she gave it to the Royal Victoria Hospital to use as a nurses residence. McGill University acquired the use of the property in 1975, and today it is known as Lady Meredith House, home to the McGill Centre for Medicine, Ethics, and Law. Meredith and his wife are buried in a plot reserved for the Meredith family at Mount Royal Cemetery. Buried there also is one of his younger brothers, Charles Meredith, with his wife, a daughter of Richard B. Angus, and his cousin, a close friend of both of the brothers, Frederick Edmund Meredith. This generation of his family in Canada, and Ireland, was a remarkably distinguished group.

== Coat of arms ==
Coat of arms of Vincent Meredith
Adopted 1917 Crest A demi-lion Sable gorged with a collar, a chain attached thereto reflexed over the back and holding a sprig of maple Or Escutcheon Argent a lion rampant Sable gorged with a collar, a chain attached thereto reflexed over the back Or, on a chief Sable two maple leaves Or Motto SUB SPE VIRTUTIS PRӔMIUM (French for 'Beneath hope, virtue’s reward') Other elements Red hand of Ulster baronet badge

== See also ==
- Canadian peers and baronets
- Meredith baronets

Baronetage of the United Kingdom
New creation	Baronet (of Montreal); 1916–1929	Extinct
