= William Ralph Meredith =

Canadian politician (1840–1923)

The Honourable Sir William Ralph Meredith KC
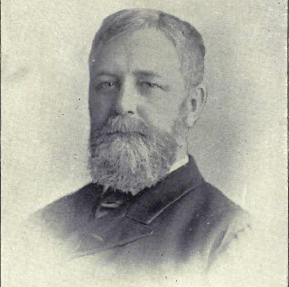
- Portrait of Meredith in the 1890s

Chief Justice of Ontario
- In office 1913–1923
- Preceded by: Sir Charles Moss
- Succeeded by: Sir William Mulock

16th Chancellor of the University of Toronto
- In office 1900–1923
- President: James Loudon; Robert Falconer
- Preceded by: Edward Blake
- Succeeded by: Byron Edmund Walker

Member of the Ontario Legislative Assembly for London
- In office 1872–1894
- Preceded by: Sir John Carling
- Succeeded by: Francis Baxter Leys

Personal details
- Born: March 31, 1840 Westminster Township, Upper Canada
- Died: August 21, 1923 (aged 83) Montreal, Quebec
- Party: Conservative
- Spouse: Mary Holmes
- Children: 4
- Relatives: Sir Vincent Meredith, Richard Martin Meredith, Charles Meredith, Thomas Graves Meredith

Sir William Ralph Meredith, KC (March 31, 1840 – August 21, 1923) was a Canadian lawyer, politician and judge. He served as Leader of the Ontario Conservatives from 1878 to 1894, Chancellor of the University of Toronto from 1900 until his death, and Chief Justice of Ontario from 1913 until his death. Through his principles, known as the "Meredith Principles", he is regarded as the founding father of the Workers' Compensation System in Ontario, the impact of which was felt throughout Canada and the United States.

== Background ==
Born March 31, 1840, at Westminster Township, Upper Canada, he was the eldest son of John Walsingham Cooke Meredith and a member of a well-known legal family in Ireland and Canada. His middle name was for his great-grandfather, Ralph Meredith (1748–1799), Attorney Exchequer and Justice of the Peace for County Dublin.

William R. Meredith and his well-known brothers were collectively known as "The Eight London Merediths", who included among them Chief Justice Richard Martin Meredith, Sir Vincent Meredith, Thomas Graves Meredith and Charles Meredith. The brothers were first cousins of The Rt. Hon. Richard Edmund Meredith, Master of the Rolls in Ireland, and Frederick Walsingham Meredith (1859–1924), President of the Law Society of Ireland. Meredith's father was a first cousin of Chief Justice Sir William Collis Meredith, Edmund Allen Meredith and Sir James Creed Meredith. The last named was the father of Judge James Creed Meredith, uncle of Chief Justice Sir Herbert Ribton Meredith.

== Early career ==
Educated at home, he afterwards briefly attended Hellmuth College, the grammar school in London, Ontario. He articled with Thomas Scatcherd before winning a two-year scholarship to the University of Toronto to study law. At this time, he also served as an officer in the London Light Infantry militia. He was called to the Bar in 1861 and entered into partnership with Scatcherd. Not before long he was considered to be "the acknowledged leader of the London Bar".

In 1871, he was elected a Bencher of the Law Society of Upper Canada, and the following year, he was awarded his Bachelor of Laws degree from the University of Toronto.

In 1875, he became a Queen's Counsel (which became King's Counsel on 22 January 1901 upon the death of Queen Victoria) .

After the death of his legal partner, Thomas Scatcherd, he succeeded him as London's city solicitor, a position another brother, Thomas Graves Meredith, would hold after him.

From 1879 to 1888, he served as the first president of the Middlesex Law Association. In 1888, he left London to take over William Alexander Foster's successful law firm in Toronto. That same year saw him become an honorary member of the University of Toronto Faculty of Law, which granted him an honorary Doctor of Laws in 1889.

== Political life ==
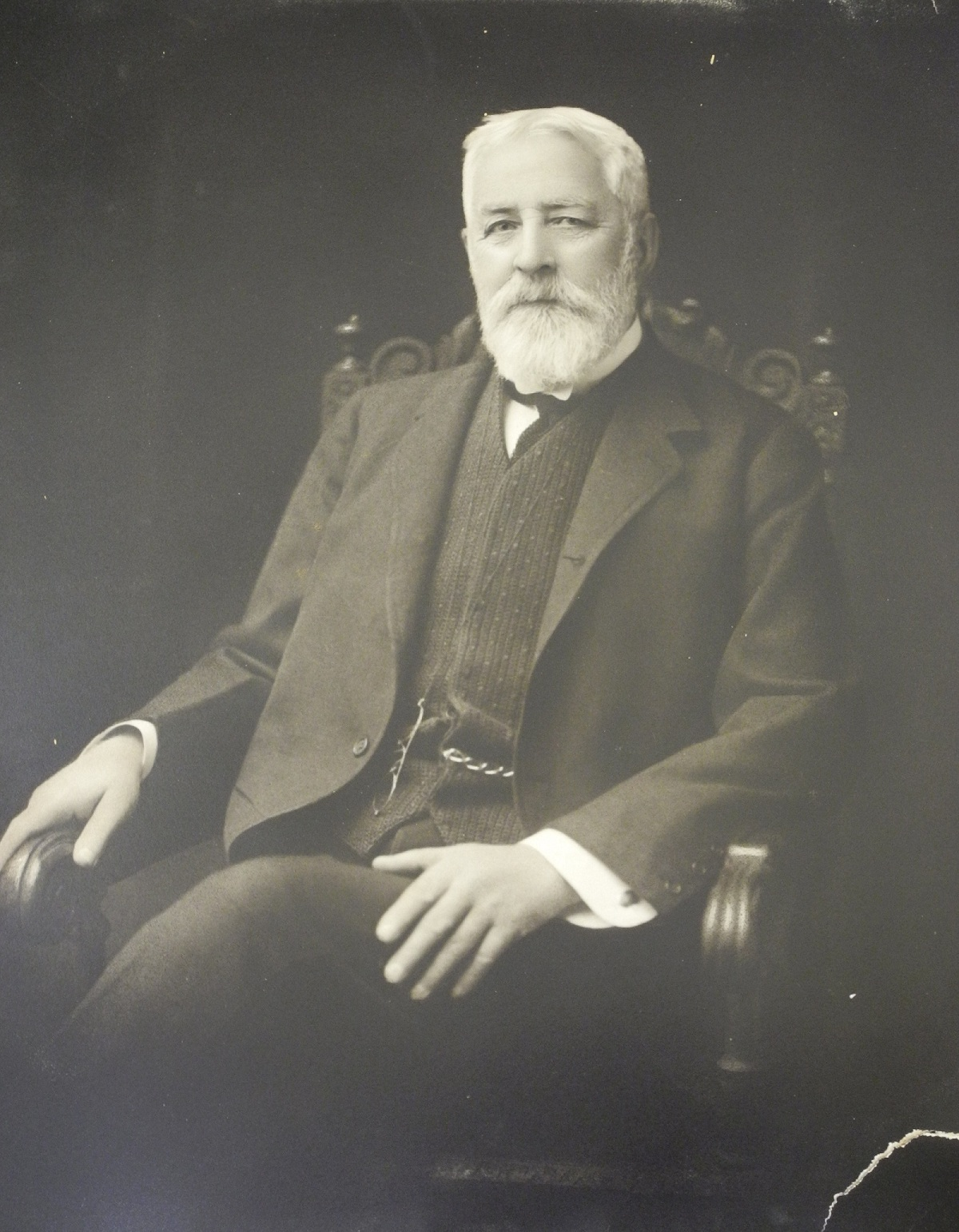
William Ralph Meredith, early 1900s, collection of the Law Society of Upper Canada

Meredith had entered politics in 1872 as a Conservative, when he succeeded Sir John Carling (whose daughter, Jessie, married his brother Thomas) as London's representative to the Legislative Assembly of Ontario. He was considered a radical by many Tories, but that did not prevent him being named deputy leader of the party in 1878. After Matthew Crooks Cameron's appointment to the bench, without even the formality of a ballot, he was chosen as the party's leader. Charles Biggar, the biographer of Meredith's chief political rival, Sir Oliver Mowat, wrote,

"There was no man in the ranks of the Opposition upon whom the choice could more worthily have fallen... Always ready in debate, and judicial in the tone of his arguments, he was a generous and formidable opponent. Especially in Committee of the Whole House, where details of legislation are worked out and party issues are for the moment forgotten, Mr. Meredith's services to the province were simply invaluable. His personal popularity was great. The Montreal Witness, a Liberal journal, declared him to be 'perhaps the most popular public man personally we have ever had in Canada'; and the House testified its appreciation of his services by voting him a salary of $2,000 per annum, which, however he declined to accept."

However, he was actively against women's rights, but that was somewhat counterbalanced by his progressive political philosophy towards the (albeit male) Native Americans, and the relief of male suffrage in his legislation in favour of worker's rights. (See section on Workers' compensation and Meredith Principles.) Despite that and other successes under Meredith's leadership, the Conservatives never reached power. Meredith saw his position as a part-time commitment (he had a full-time legal practice in Toronto) and Prime Minister Sir John A. Macdonald's conservative hard-line approach caused Meredith many embarrassments. But, to a greater extent his lack of real political success was a direct result of the superior political skill of the Liberal leader in power, Sir Oliver Mowat.

Meredith's disagreements with Macdonald culminated in his and his immediate friends refusing to take part in Macdonald's electoral campaign of 1891. Considered as one of the best campaign orators, Meredith's decision caused both shock and disappointment within the Tory ranks. Meredith saw Macdonald's campaign, led by Sir Charles Tupper, as "a slanderous crusade against his fellow countrymen".

Though the Merediths were Anglo-Irish, his paternal grandmother was from a prominent Catholic family in Ireland and so the Catholic population in Ontario had initially hailed Meredith as one of their own. However, in his later political years, Meredith felt that Mowat's Liberals were granting 'humiliating concessions' to the Catholic minority, and this led to his final political demise. As a matter of conscience and increasingly frustrated by Macdonald's refusal to listen to him, Meredith launched an attack on what he saw as unfair advantages enjoyed by the separate Catholic schools. He denounced the Catholics' rights to a guaranteed seat on all secondary school boards and the use of unapproved texts in separate schools. In comparison to The Toronto Mail, his attacks were measured, but it was enough to draw the wrath of the Catholic population, which immediately swung their support firmly behind the Liberals.

== Judicial appointments ==
His dispute with the Catholic Church led to another embarrassing electoral defeat, and the government in Ottawa now viewed him as a "governmental impossibility" in Ontario and decided it might be more prudent to put Meredith in a position that enabled him to put his real talents to work. In 1894, he retired from politics and accepted the position of Chief Justice of the Common Pleas and of the Ontario High Court of Justice, and was knighted in that capacity two years later. In 1913, he was succeeded by one of his brothers, Richard Martin Meredith, and appointed Chief Justice of the Ontario Court of Appeal. On the reorganization of the Ontario judiciary he was made Chief Justice of Ontario, in which office he died.

Meredith stuck rigidly to the doctrine of applying precedents, avoiding narrow or restrictive interpretations of the law. In his obituary, Toronto City Solicitor William Johnston praised him for being 'one of the best versed judges in Municipal law.' Occasionally he found himself presiding over cases in which two of his brothers (Edmund and Richard) stood before him. In 1913, the Toronto World reported,

"As a family the Merediths, whilst agreeable enough to those they meet have always held themselves aloof and have mixed little in society. In Sir William this characteristic is noticeable. He is a man with very few intimates. He has climbed to his present eminence by sheer ability, not by means of wirepulling. Kindly at heart and sympathetic, he is yet so sharp-witted that he cannot resist an occasional biting word or innuendo, a habit which has gained him not a few enemies. On the bench he is severe, demanding much from those who appear before him. He is in effect a judicial autocrat. In private life on the other hand he can be one of the most delightful of conversationalists with a rich store of knowledge and anecdote."

== Invitation to return to politics ==
Though on the face of it, Meredith's political career had been unsuccessful, when the powerfully persuasive Sir Charles Tupper became Prime Minister of Canada in 1896, he and the former Prime Minister, Sir Mackenzie Bowell, tried valiantly but in vain to persuade Meredith to leave the bench and join Tupper's cabinet. In his book on Sir Wilfrid Laurier and the Liberal Party, Sir John Willison writes of Meredith that "there have been few more useful and honourable in our history, and it can hardly be questioned that if he had joined Sir Charles Tupper he would have sensibly improved the prospects of the Conservative party".

== Public service ==
Outside of court Meredith still exercised great political influence, and his "legislative and forensic skills were frequently enlisted by various governments". It was widely believed that Meredith was the political mentor of Sir James Whitney, and that he had a hand in framing some of the progressive measures put through by him. Meredith also mediated between Whitney and Sir Adam Beck, suggesting and even wording many of the bills that established the Hydro-Electric Power Commission of Ontario. The Toronto Daily Star stated that Meredith's "revision of the statutes of Ontario was masterful".

In 1895, Meredith was appointed a Senator of the University of Toronto, and five years later he was unanimously elected Chancellor of that university, a position he held until his death. He was a member of the Royal Commission that investigated the affairs of the University of Toronto in 1905. He was also called upon to lead commissions into the causes for the collapse of the Farmer's Bank of York, Upper Canada and to investigate the worth of the Canadian Northern Railway prior to its takeover by the government of Sir Arthur Meighen. He was President of the South African Memorial Association and joint Chairman of Toronto's Civic Improvement Committee.

== Workers' compensation and Meredith Principles ==
Sir William Meredith is regarded as the founding father of workers' compensation in Ontario and, by extension, Canada. As the Industrial Revolution created crowded factories and unsafe working conditions, injured workers and their families had few choices when it came to receiving benefits or compensation for their injuries.

The Government of Ontario realized that changes to the compensation laws were essential. In 1910, Sir James Whitney appointed Meredith to head the first Royal Commission to study workers' compensation systems throughout the world and to make recommendations. In his royal commission report, Meredith said that the true aim of compensation law was to provide for the workman and his dependents and prevent their becoming a charge upon their relatives or friends, or the community at large. He identified five basic principles for a compassionate compensation system, the most important of which was the idea of 'no-fault insurance'. That meant that workers would give up their right to sue their employers in exchange for guaranteed no-fault income security in the event of a workplace injury. Also, employers would pay for the system in return for protection against liability.

In 1913, Meredith presented his recommendations and his draft legislation came into effect the following year. The impact of Meredith's new system was felt throughout Canada and the United States and as such his five principal ideas (no-fault compensation, security of benefits, collective liability, exclusive jurisdiction and administration by independent boards) became known as and are still known as the "Meredith Principles".

== Family and private life ==
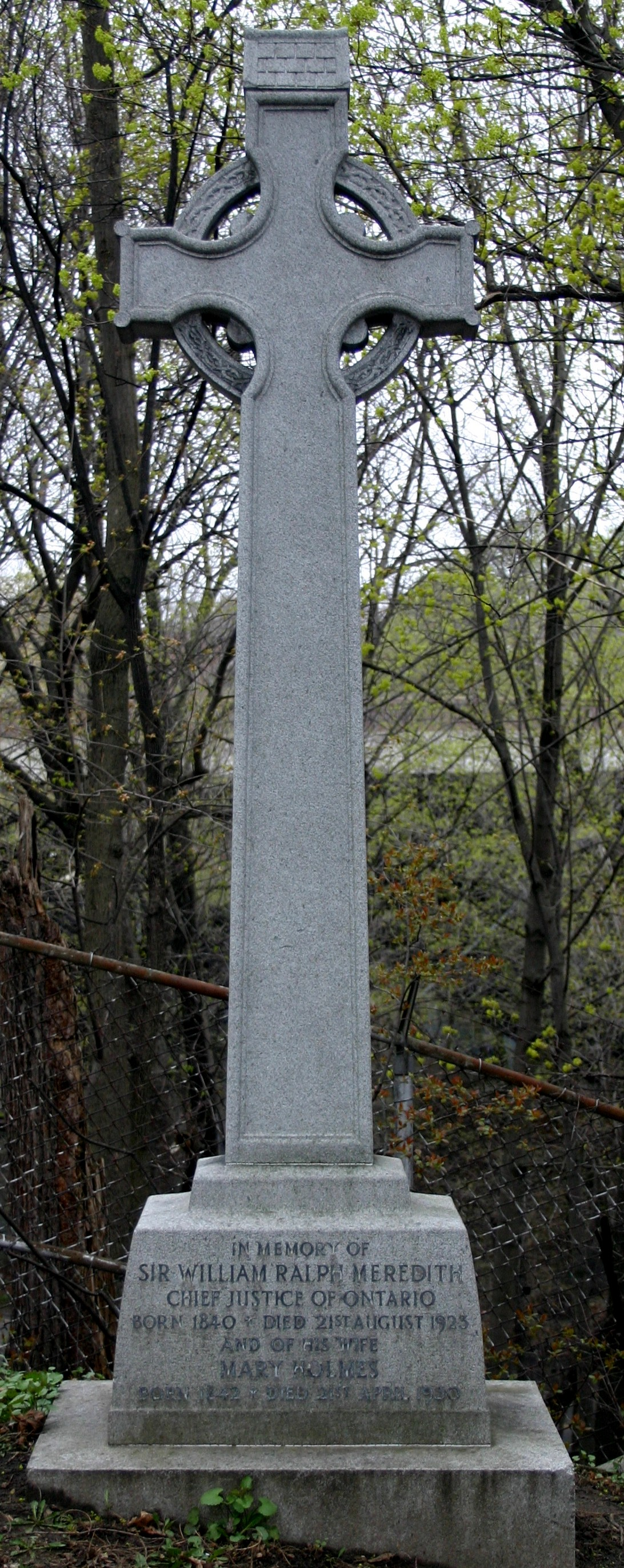
Grave marker

In 1862, Meredith married Mary Holmes (1842–1930), daughter of Marcus Holmes, Mayor of London, director of the London & Lake Huron Railway Company and president of the Horticultural Society. The Merediths lived at 41 Binscarth Road in Rosedale, Toronto, and they were parents of three daughters and one son who lived to adulthood. Their eldest daughter, Maude, married William Thompson Ramsay, for whom Ramsay, Calgary is named. The next daughter, Constance, married George Armstrong Peters, and their daughter, Ruth Meredith Peters, married Claude Spaak, widower of Suzanne Spaak. The youngest daughter, Isabel, married Dr. James David Thorburn, son of James Thorburn. The Merediths' son, Major John Redmond Walsingham Meredith (1878–1916), married a daughter of I.F. Hellmuth but predeceased his parents in England during World War I, leaving two daughters.

The Dictionary of Canadian Biography noted that, although severe, Meredith was considered dignified and courteous on the bench, and he was affectionately known as 'The Chief' among his fellow judges. Like most of his brothers, his favorite pastime was gardening. In 1913, The Toronto World reported:

"Despite his seventy three years, Sir William is still a fine, erect and handsome man. His favorite pastime is gardening and in his beautiful grounds in Rosedale he spends much time. Donning a straw hat and gloves he delights to move about among his plants and bushes, weeding and clipping, or else to dig out dandelion roots from his lawn. Even in this pursuit he shows himself a man of solitary habits."

Following a swim off the coast of Maine, Meredith became ill and died a few weeks later whilst staying with relatives in Montreal. He and his wife are interred at the St. James Cemetery in Toronto.

== Electoral history ==
Ontario provincial by-election, September 4, 1872: London Resignation of John Carling
Party	Candidate	Votes	%	±%
Conservative	William Ralph Meredith	932	51.12	−12.71
Liberal	J. Durand	891	48.88	+12.71
Total valid votes		1,823	100.0	+18.15
Conservative hold		Swing		−12.71
Source: History of the Electoral Districts, Legislatures and Ministries of the Province of Ontario

1875 Ontario general election: London
Party	Candidate	Votes	%	±%
Conservative	William Ralph Meredith	1,311	52.84	+1.72
Liberal	J. Durand	1,170	47.16	−1.72
Turnout		2,481	60.39	
Eligible voters		4,108		
Conservative hold		Swing		+1.72
Source: Elections Ontario

1879 Ontario general election: London
Party	Candidate	Votes	%	±%
Conservative	William Ralph Meredith	1,578	58.25	+5.41
Liberal	Mr. Magee	1,131	41.75	−5.41
Total valid votes		2,709	55.24	−5.15
Eligible voters		4,904		
Conservative hold		Swing		+5.41
Source: Elections Ontario

== Related newspaper articles ==
- The Irish Standard Bearer, The Irish Canadian, May 28, 1879
- Must Meredith Go
- The Complex Personality of Ontarios Chief Justice The Toronto World, July 27, 1913
- Sir William Meredith May Be New Lieutenant-Governor
- Sir William Meredith May Have Resigned to Accept Chairmanship of Ontario Railway Commission
- Chief Justice of Supreme Court of Ontario is Dead
- Notable Career Ended by Death, The Quebec Daily Telegraph, August 18, 1923

Academic offices
Preceded by Edward Blake	Chancellor of the University of Toronto; 1900–1923	Succeeded by Byron Edmund Walker
