= Charles Meredith (banker) =

Canadian businessman and banker

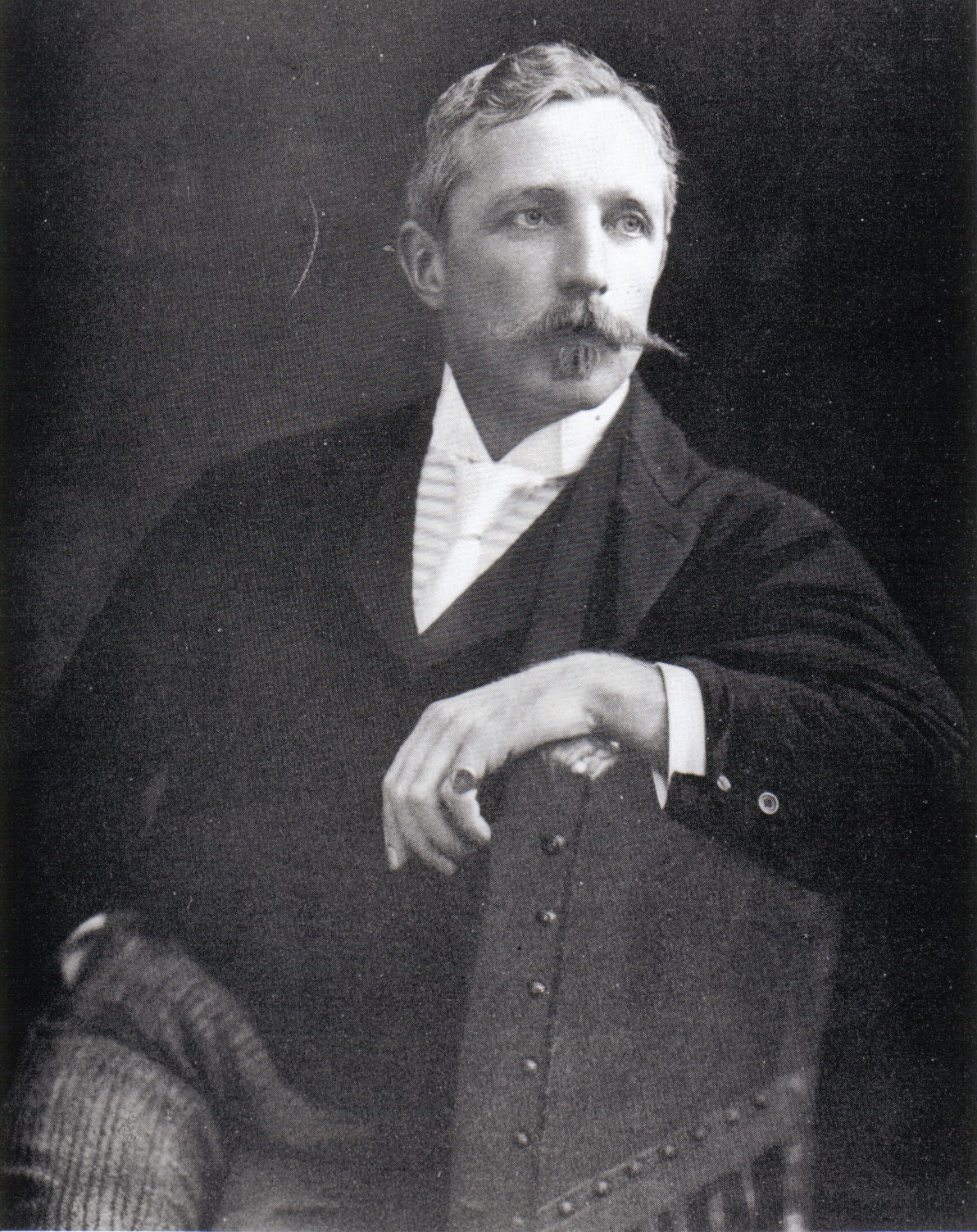
- Born: 17 December 1854; London, Canada West
- Died: 7 January 1928 (aged 73); Montreal, Quebec
- Resting place: Mount Royal Cemetery, Montreal
- Occupation: Businessman
- Known for: President of C. Meredith & Co. and Montreal Stock Exchange
- Spouse: Elspeth Hudson Angus

Charles Meredith (December 17, 1854 – January 7, 1928) was a Canadian businessman. He was president of the Montreal Stock Exchange and president of C. Meredith & Co., Montreal's leading brokerage firm in the early 20th century. He was a co-founder of the Mount Royal Club, and he had owned the land on which the Ritz-Carlton Hotel in Montreal was built, becoming a principal shareholder with a significant influence on its image and future. His mansion in Montreal's Golden Square Mile, now known as Charles Meredith House, is currently part of McGill University.

== Early life ==
He was born in 1854 at London, Canada West, the seventh son of John Walsingham Cooke Meredith and his wife, Sarah Pegler (1818–1900). Charles and his well-known brothers were collectively known as the "Eight London Merediths", which included Sir William Ralph Meredith, Chief Justice Richard Martin Meredith, Sir Vincent Meredith and Thomas Graves Meredith. Charles Meredith and his brothers were cousins of, and well known to, Judge Richard Edmund Meredith, Frederick Edmund Meredith, William Archer Redmond and Judge James Creed Meredith. Charles Meredith was privately educated at home before briefly attending Hellmuth College, London, and then embarking on his business career.

== C. Meredith & Co. ==
In 1872, Meredith started his business career with Sir Hugh Allan's Merchant's Bank, rising to the position of manager of the Western branches at Regina and Brandon. In 1887, he came to Montreal and purchased a seat on the Montreal Stock Exchange, founding C. Meredith & Co. Ltd, Stock and Bond Brokers with offices on St-Francois-Xavier Street. The company, which soon established itself as the leading bond house in Montreal, was taken over by the United Financial Corporation Ltd. Meredith was president of both of these institutions until they amalgamated with the National City Company.

When Gerald Farrell became the secretary-treasurer of C. Meredith & Co. in 1908, with the expansion of the Canadian West, the firm had started to engage in industrial merger promotion. By 1910, C. Meredith & Co. had opened an office in London and was acting as an issue house in England by at least 1913. After Dominion Securities of Toronto, C. Meredith & Co. was the first Canadian stockbrokerage to open an office in London, enjoying excellent connections mainly through the firm's close relationship with the Bank of Montreal (of which his brother, Sir Vincent Meredith, was president), Canada's largest and most powerful commercial bank. Many of the directors of the Bank of Montreal were also directors and principal shareholders in C. Meredith & Co.

In 1902, Meredith was elected president of the Montreal Stock Exchange, a position he held until 1905. In 1910, he became president of Hillcress Collieries Ltd., and he was a director of Tuckett Tobacco and the British & Colonial Press Service. He also sat on the Board of Arbitration and the Montreal Board of Trade. Meredith worked on the exchange for nearly twenty years, and at his retirement was one of its oldest members. His business was largely of an investment class, and he discouraged speculative ventures on the part of his clients, grounding his reputation in financial circles as one of the highest integrity. Due to failing health, Meredith was forced to retire from business life in 1924. He maintained a considerable financial interest and a friendly connection with his successors.

== Ritz-Carlton Hotel ==
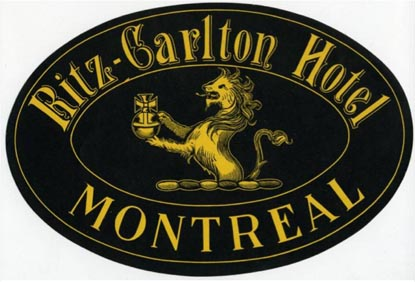
Original emblem of the Ritz-Carlton, depicting the lion rampant that was also Charles Meredith's family crest

Meredith owned a plot of land at Drummond Street and Sherbrooke Street in Montreal, valued at "one dollar, but with good and valuable considerations". In 1909, he sold the land to the recently created Carlton Hotel Company of Montreal. The principal investors in the company (led by Charles Hosmer, a personal friend of César Ritz) were Sir Charles Gordon (vice-president of C. Meredith & Co., and later president of the Bank of Montreal), Sir Montagu Allan and Sir Herbert Holt.

Aside from the cursory one dollar, Meredith received $787,500 in preferred shares in the Carlton Hotel Company, of which $314,404 was paid to him in cash and the balance of $469,096 was covered by "goodwill, benefits and advantages". Meredith's share made him a principal shareholder, and he had a major influence on how the Ritz-Carlton Hotel was run, and its future.

== Marriage and residences ==
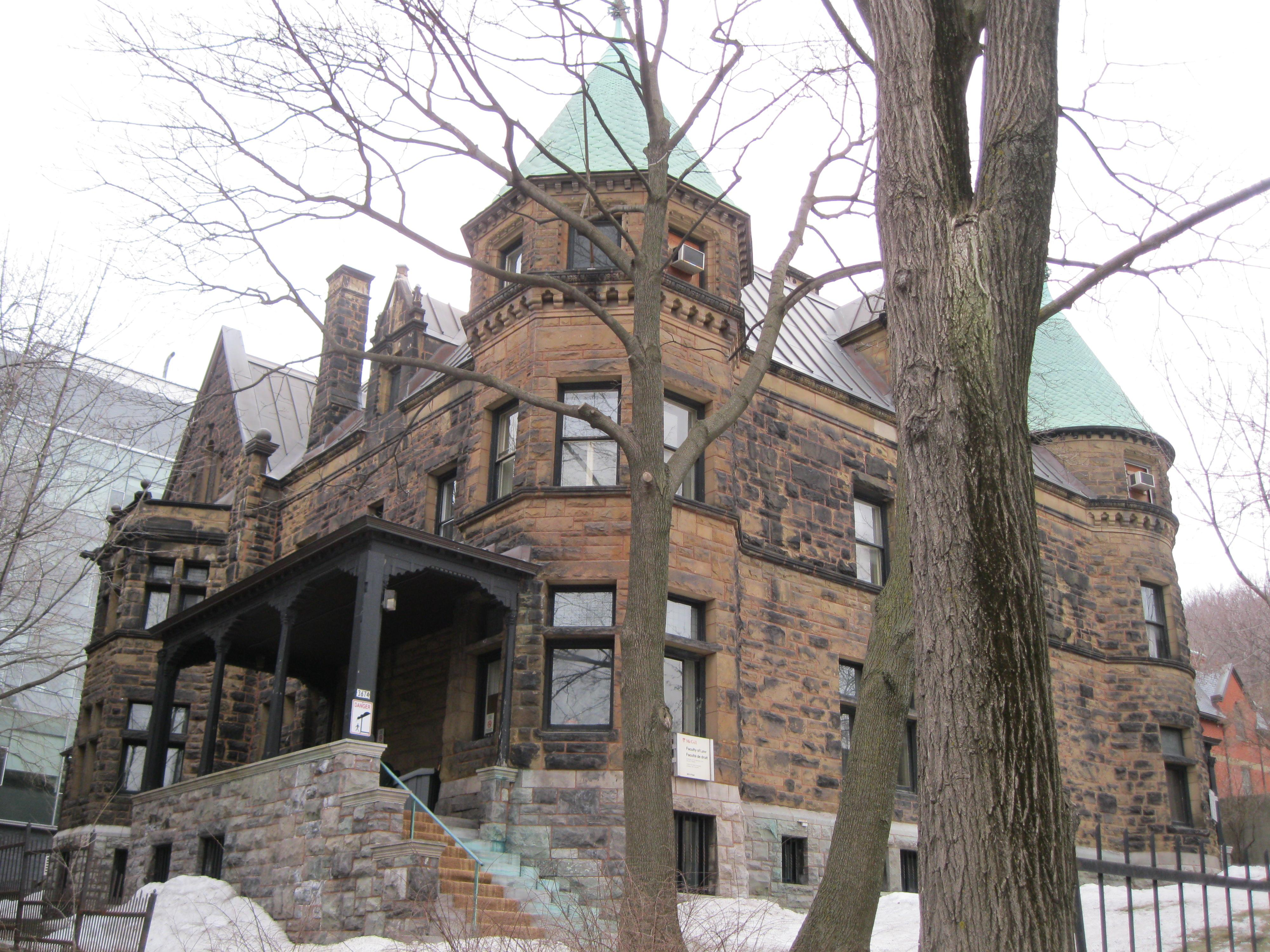
3674 Peel Street in Montreal

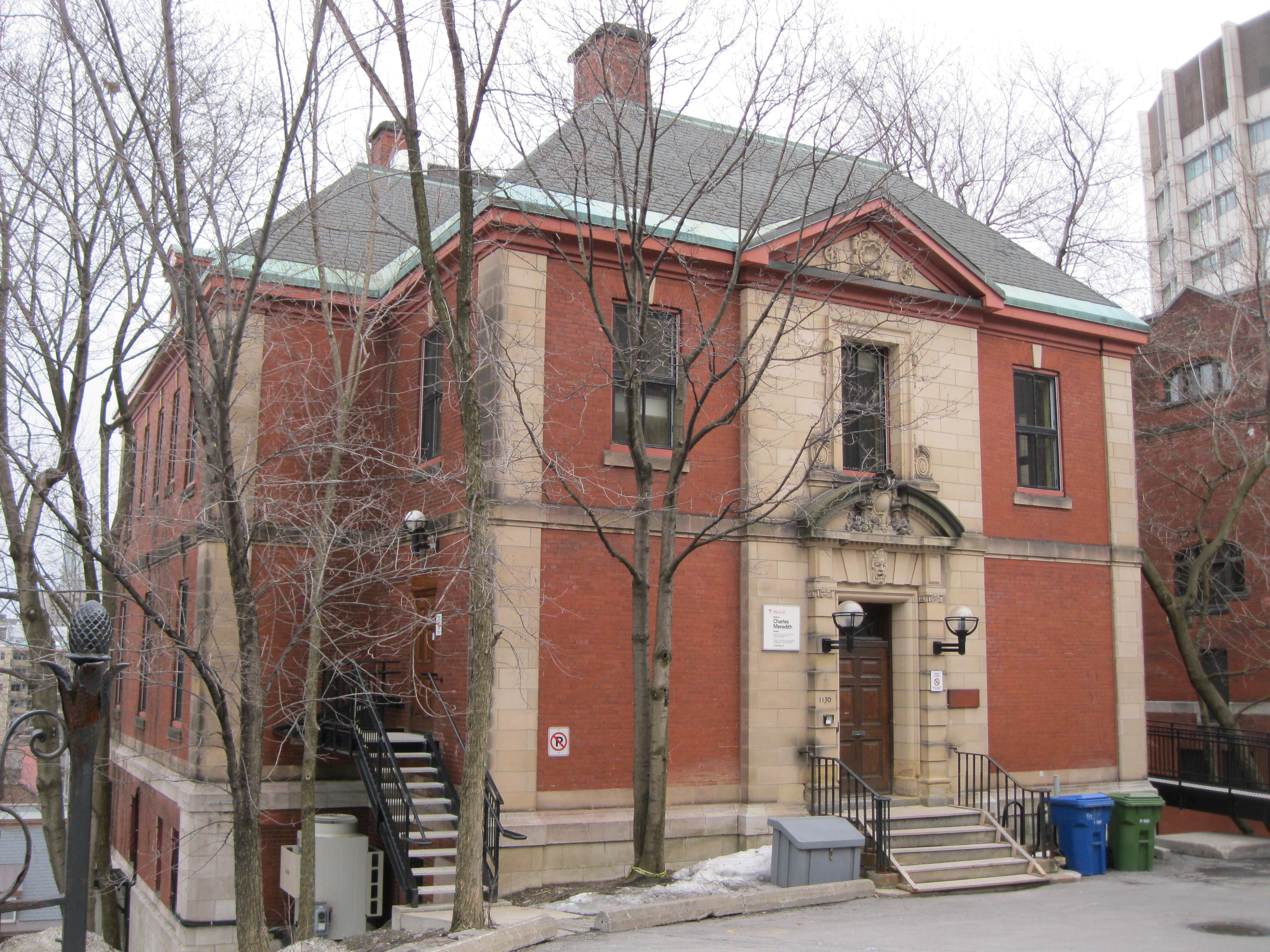
Charles Meredith House at 1130 Pine Avenue West in Montreal

In 1893, Meredith married Elspeth Hudson Angus (1858–1936), the eldest daughter of Richard B. Angus, who was a co-founder of the Canadian Pacific Railway and served as president of the Bank of Montreal. As a wedding present, Richard Angus commissioned architect Edward Maxwell to build the newlyweds a home known as "The Gatehouse" at 3674 Peel Street in Montreal (which still stands as part of the McGill Faculty of Law, known as the Angus-McIntyre House).

In 1904, the Merediths asked Edward Maxwell to design a large home for them at 1130 Pine Avenue West in Montreal, which was completed a year later. The house is located beside Ardvarna, which was built for Meredith's brother Vincent. After Meredith died in 1928, his widow continued to live there until her death in 1936, when she bequeathed the house to be used as a residence for nurses of the Royal Victoria Hospital. In 1975, the building was acquired by McGill University and serves today as part of the McGill Faculty of Medicine, known as Charles Meredith House. The couple's former home at 3674 Peel Street was afterwards lived in by another of the "Eight London Merediths", John Stanley Meredith (1843–1920), general manager of the Merchant's Bank in Montreal.

In 1897, the Merediths had bought Bally Bawn, a Gothic Revival country house that was built in 1864 around a Sulpician library from 1750, at 202 Senneville Road in Senneville, Quebec. They employed Edward Maxwell to design some additions and alterations to the house, which was added to again in 1909 by architect Robert Findlay, giving the house its present size: "An impressive country residence marked by three high gables... Hidden behind the estate's foliage, amidst many flowerbeds, was a tennis court, garages, cottages for the chauffeurs and gardeners, henhouses, greenhouses and various other auxiliary buildings."

== Private life ==
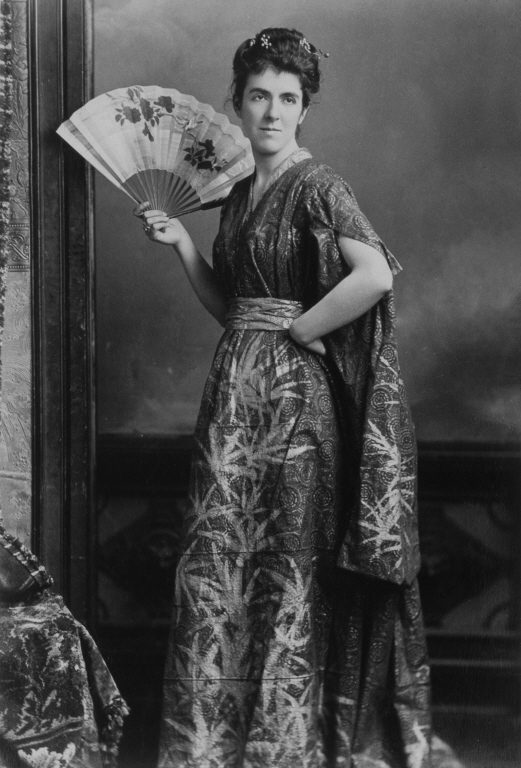
Elspeth Angus in 1886 before the Castanet Club Ball, Montreal

Like many of his brothers, Meredith shared an enthusiasm for floriculture. His home in Montreal had a large conservatory, where on one occasion he chose to have his portrait taken. His knowledge of gardening and tree culture was said to have been "comparable to a good professional gardener".

In his earlier years, Meredith had been "an athlete of renown". He was a good rower and boxer, and very fond of outdoor exercise of all descriptions. He loved to fish and was an excellent shot. He was a director of the Quebec Fish and Game Association, and the Montreal Parks and Playgrounds Association. His clubs included the Mount Royal Club, St. James's Club, Montreal Racquet Club, Royal Montreal Golf Club, Empire Club of Canada, Montreal Jockey Club, Royal St. Lawrence Yacht Club and the Montreal Hunt.

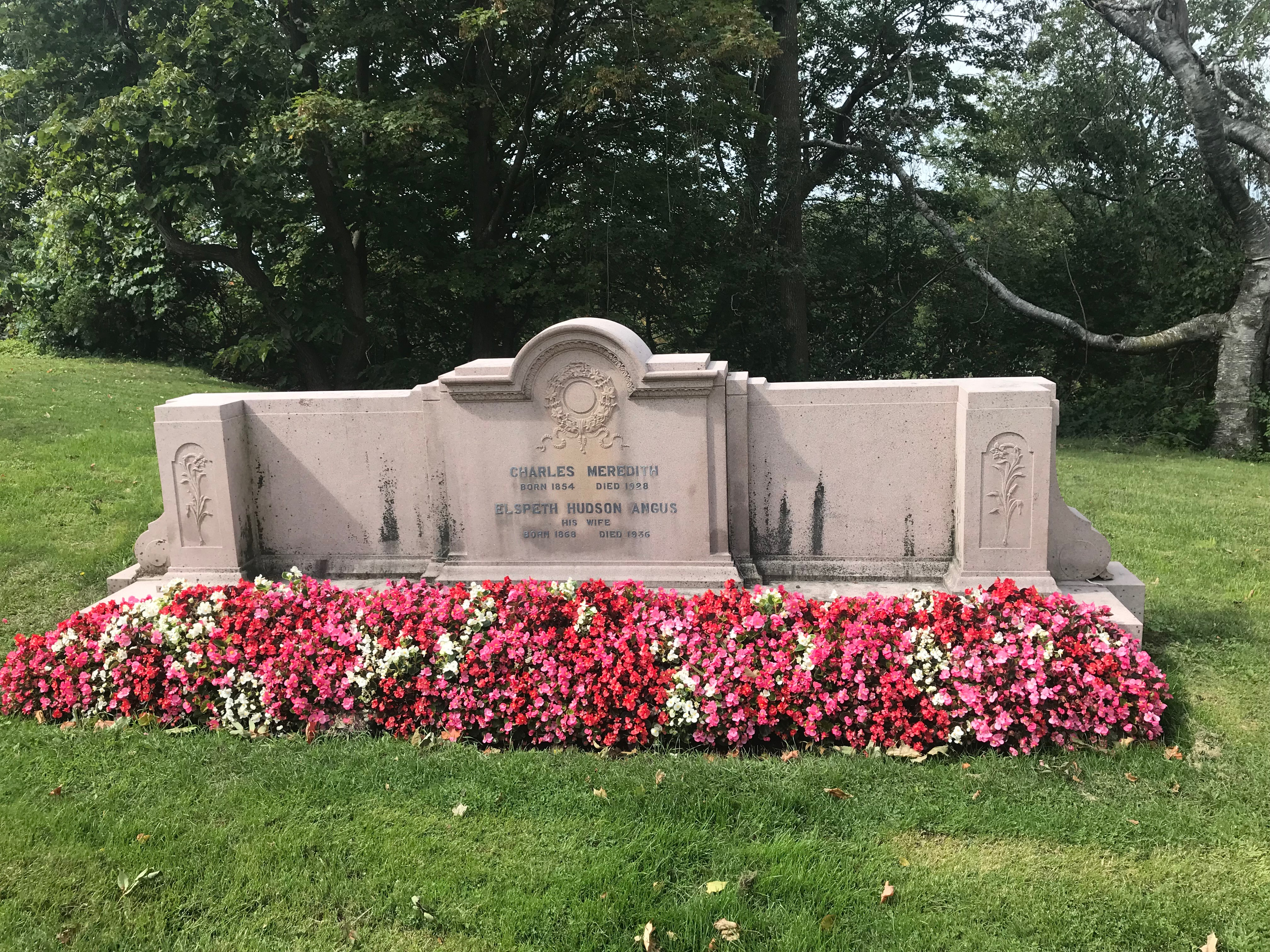
Meredith's funeral monument in Mount Royal Cemetery

Charles and Elspeth Meredith died without children. Meredith was said to have enjoyed a relationship "like that of father and son" with a long-time employee of C. Meredith & Co., Hartland MacDougall. Mrs. Meredith was a godmother to some of her Angus nephews and nieces as well as to "the Montreal English theatre icon", Roseanna Seaborn Todd, granddaughter of Sir Edward Clouston, 1st Baronet. Charles and Elspeth Meredith were buried at Mount Royal Cemetery, next to Sir Vincent and Lady Meredith and Frederick Edmund Meredith.

== Related newspaper articles ==
- Charles Meredith's Retirement from the Merchant's Bank
- Meredith Estate Case Appeal Filed
- Appeal for Share of Estate worth $2,500,000 fails
