= Richard Martin Meredith =

Canadian judge (1847–1934)

Richard Martin Meredith QC (27 March 1847 – 20 May 1934) was a co-founder and the first Chancellor of The University of Western Ontario; vice-chancellor of Ontario; President of the High Court of the Supreme Court of Ontario and Chief Justice of the Ontario Court of Common Pleas.

== Family ==
Born at 565 Talbot Street, London, Canada West, he was one of the eight sons of John Walsingham Cooke Meredith, a first cousin of Chief Justice Sir William Collis Meredith, Edmund Allen Meredith and James Creed Meredith. He shared the same name as one of his great uncles (the father of James Creed Meredith), who was named for Richard Martin, a contemporary of Meredith's great-grandfather, Ralph Meredith (1748–1799), Attorney Exchequer and Justice of the Peace for County Dublin. His brothers, known as The Eight London Merediths, included Chief Justice William Ralph Meredith, Vincent Meredith, Thomas Graves Meredith Q.C., and Charles Meredith, first cousins of Richard Edmund Meredith and Frederick Walsingham Meredith, President of the Law Society of Ireland.

== Legal career ==
Educated at Hellmuth Boys' College, London, he then proceeded to the Royal Military College of Canada, passing out in 1865. He served as an officer at Windsor, Ontario during the Fenian raids, earning a medal. Following this he entered his brother William's legal offices and was called to the Bar in 1869. Specializing in chancery and equity law, he went into practice with another brother, Edmund Meredith (1845–1921) Q.C., a well-known criminal barrister, forming the London-based firm of Meredith & Meredith, subsequently Meredith, Judd & Meredith. He continued his career in London, during which time he took silk as a Queen's Counsel, until the Prime Minister, John A. Macdonald appointed him a Judge of the Chancery Division of the High Court of Ontario in 1890, at Toronto. In the same year (1890), he was also elected to the vice chancellorship of Ontario, a position he held until 1905. From 1905 to 1912, he was President of the High Court of the Supreme Court of Ontario. In 1905, he also served as a Judge at the Court of Appeal, where his frequent disagreements with his brothers William and Edmund earned him the nickname 'the dissenting judge'. In 1912, he succeeded his elder brother, William, as Chief Justice of the Court of Common Pleas, his final judicial post, retiring in 1930. He was sometime a director of the Ontario Investment Association.

== University of Western Ontario ==
Meredith was instrumental in the founding of The University of Western Ontario, at his hometown of London. He served as the first Chancellor (1912–1916) of the university and was chairman of the Board of Governors between 1908 and 1914. He established the R.M. Meredith Society, still in operation today, to help fund under-privileged students.

== Personality ==
He retired from the Bench at the age of 83, and moved back from Toronto to the home where he was born, on Talbot Street, London, Ontario. "A noted athlete in his youth, he preserved in his erect bearing and brisk step, great physical vigour and athletic energy, even after he had reached an advanced age." He enjoyed floriculture, and spent much of his time gardening on the Meredith's London estate.

In his earlier days he was a well-known figure in Toronto society, but on returning to London he lived in almost complete retirement. In 1901, he presented a chime of ten bells, cast in England, and the clock on the clocktower to St. Paul's Cathedral (London, Ontario) in memory of his parents. He was the best man at the wedding of his brother, Sir Vincent Meredith in 1888. He was unmarried, and died at the home his father had built in the early 1840s, and where he was born. He is buried at the Meredith plot in Woodland Cemetery, London. He left an estate of $235,598, having given much away to charitable causes during his lifetime. His portrait, and that of his brother Sir William Ralph Meredith, hangs in Osgoode Hall, Toronto.

== Arms ==
Coat of arms of Richard Martin Meredith
Notes Confirmed by Sir Nevile Rodwell Wilkinson, Ulster King of Arms, 8 August 1924. Crest A demi-lion Sable langued Gules collared and chained Or. Escutcheon Argent a lion rampant Sable langued Gules collared and chained Or. Motto Sub Spe Virtutis Præmium (In Hope Lies The Award Of Virtue)

== See also ==
- Meredith Resigns as Chief Justice - Montreal Gazette, 30 September 1930
- Sir William Meredith May Be New Lieutenant-Governor - Rumors at Ottawa that R.M. Meredith will Succeed to Chief-Justiceship
- Member of Family of Noted Brothers Dies - R.M. Meredith - Ottawa Citizen, 21 May 1934
- The Meredith Family
