= John Walsingham Cooke Meredith =

Irish-Canadian public servant and businessman

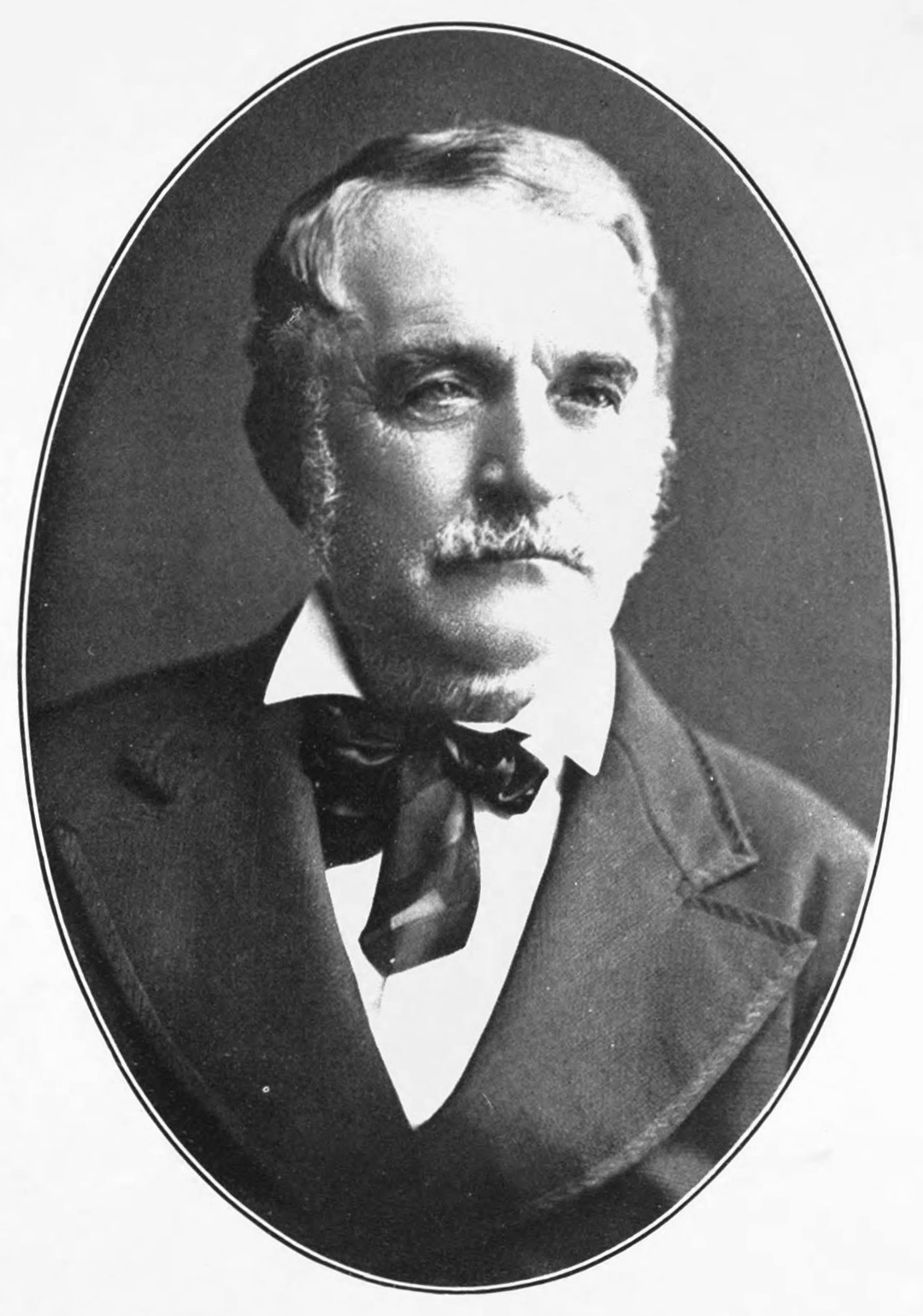
Meredith, c. the 1860s

John Walsingham Cooke Meredith JP (1809–1881) was an Irish–Canadian office holder and businessman, best remembered as the father of the Eight London Merediths. He previously practised as a barrister and was a member of the first Eccentric Club in London, England.

== Background ==
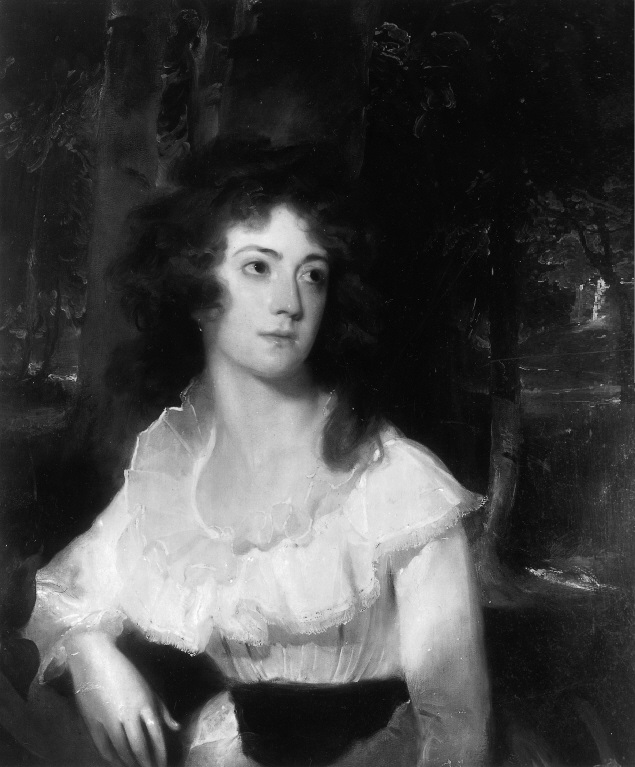
Magdalene (Redmond) Meredith (1785–1851). This painting belonged to her grandson, Charles Meredith

Born at Dublin, May 9, 1809, the son of John Meredith (1784–1866), a lawyer who divided his time between Dublin and Fair View, near Avoca, County Wicklow; "a jolly looking, grey haired, hook nosed old gentleman (with a) good humoured face beaming with kindness". His mother, Magdalene (1785–1851), was the eldest daughter of John Redmond (1737–1819) J.P., of Newtown House, County Wexford & Charlemont Street, Dublin, by his wife, Anne (1743–1821), daughter and co-heiress of John Walsingham Cooke of Cookestown (otherwise Sleanagrane), County Wexford, who was the last male descendant of Sir Richard Cooke, Chancellor of the Exchequer of Ireland. His father's Anglo-Irish family had lived at Templerany House in County Wicklow since the late 17th century, while his mother's Catholic family were of ancient Norman-Irish stock, originally seated at Redmond Hall (renamed Loftus Hall), and after its confiscation, Killygowan, also in County Wexford.

On his mother's side, his cousins included John Edward Redmond (1806-1865) M.P., the first of a famous Irish political dynasty; John Henry O'Byrne Redmond (1825–1866) of Killoughter, County Wicklow, created Count de Raymond of the Papal States as Chamberlain to Pope Pius IX; and, Henry Redmond, who married the only daughter of Ellen (O'Connell) FitzSimon. On his father's side he was a cousin of Sir James Creed Meredith, Chief Justice Sir William Collis Meredith and Edmund Allen Meredith. With the last two named, they headed three of the four branches of this notable family in Canada.

== Dublin and London ==
From 1819 to 1823, Meredith was educated at 'Hamilton's school' before attending Dr Behan's (or Behane's) with other members of his family in Co. Wexford. On November 7, 1825, he entered Trinity College Dublin, coming 13th in the entry examinations out of 109 candidates. In 1828, he was admitted to King's Inns, Dublin. He graduated with a B.A. in 1830 and spent that summer in London.

Returning to London the following year (1831), he was admitted as a barrister to Gray's Inn and became a member of the first Eccentric Club at May's Buildings on St Martin's Lane. A few weeks after taking up lodgings in Soho, Meredith was brought before the Old Bailey as a witness to a robbery that took place there. The accused, a young servant by the name of Ann Hyde, attempted to implicate the new lodger – Meredith – as the thief of several rubies and emeralds. A constable was sent for him and his rooms and person were searched but nothing was found. Still insistent of Meredith's guilt, Miss Hyde then tried to place a ruby in Meredith's sitting room but was thwarted in her attempt to frame him by the landlord and brought to court. She was found guilty, but the jury spared her from the death penalty due to her landlord having not taken enough care to lock his valuables away.

== Marriage ==
On July 3, 1831, a couple of months after his unpleasant appearance at the Old Bailey, Meredith sailed back to Dublin. Two weeks later (July 16), one of their children recorded that 'my father and mother sailed for Liverpool' from Dublin, but this seems unlikely as they were not yet married and Sarah would only have been twelve or thirteen years old. Liverpool then being a popular port for those choosing to emigrate to North America, it is possible that Meredith sailed to Canada from there, but his biographers state the year of his arrival to be 1834.

His wife's family, the Peglers, came to Canada separately from Meredith and farmed across the river from him in Westminster Township, Ontario. On December 1, 1835, one year after what is generally supposed to be his arrival in Canada, John Meredith married Sarah Pegler (1819–1900), a few months after she had turned sixteen.

Sarah was the daughter of Anthony Pegler (1792–1871) and Temperence Harris (1792–1873). Both her parents lived at King's Stanley, near Stroud, Gloucestershire, where the Pegler name has been found in great numbers since at least the mid sixteenth century. Her father was a farmer and butcher, and it is presumed that he was also the same Anthony Pegler of King's Stanley found in the Gloucestershire gaol register who was one of four Peglers sentenced together in 1830, though the only one not to be deported to Australia. Going by the Gloucestershire Public Records, it would seem that both Sarah's parents died in England, rather than in Canada. The Anthony Pegler with whom she lived in Canada is thought to have been Sarah's elder brother, and it is most likely that he emigrated there taking Sarah with him after their father was placed in gaol in 1830. On a visit to his cousin in 1861, the diarist Edmund Allen Meredith recorded,

Bye the bye I should say that I formed a more favourable idea than I had before done of my cousin-in-law Mrs Meredith and of her eldest daughter – Mrs M., although not elegant appears sensible and a woman of some character. Annie also seems an amiable girl. Isabel was, I was told, enjoying herself very much in Ireland, and Uncle John had quite recovered from the effects of the over physicking he went through at London (England)

== Canada ==
According to the London Free Press Meredith came to Canada 'seized with the wander-spirit of youth to seek his fortune farming'. Two of his first cousins, William Collis Meredith and Henry Howard Meredith (1815–1892), were then starting their legal careers in Montreal (though Henry soon after moved to Port Hope, Ontario where he rapidly became a successful land developer), but he passed them by and carried on out west. He stopped at the township of Westminster in Upper Canada, eight miles from London, Ontario, where he bought a bush farm and settled down to commence his new life.

Farming did not prove to be as profitable as he had hoped, and as such soon afterwards Meredith moved the eight miles into London itself and turned his hand to business. He carefully bought land before selling it on for a profit, as well as loaning money and offering insurances to new and old settlers alike. He bought and rented out buildings on London's principal street, Dundas Street, and when the much desired position of deputy collector of customs at Port Stanley, Ontario was offered to him he readily accepted it. He also served as market clerk at London, Justice of the Peace, and finally clerk of the Division Court, a position he held until his death.

In 1846, Meredith built a substantial home for himself and his family at 565 Talbot Street, on the corner of Wellington Street and facing Victoria Park, which remained in his family for just under one hundred years before it was demolished to make way for Centennial Hall, a theatre and concert venue. The Meredith family home was described as being 'rich in cultural elements'. An article on Meredith's sons appeared in the June 1913, edition of Maclean's magazine, which gives an account of John Meredith,

The father (JWCM), while far from being parsimonious, was a man who understood the value of money and was exceedingly careful in handling it. He lived simply, spent next to nothing on entertainment, joined no societies, and kept his nose steadily to the grindstone. When he had gathered together a little capital by the exercise of frugality, it was not difficult for him to make it grow like the proverbial snowball. In the fifties, sixties and seventies, what seems today an excessive rate of interest was commonly charged on loans and Mr Meredith was not slow to collect his twenty-five per cent on the money he advanced. He made large profits on land sold for taxes, which he bought cheap, held and disposed of later on. When he died it was reported that an estate valued at nearly a quarter of a million dollars was divided among his children.

== Children ==
John and Sarah's daughters were said to be 'remarkable for their beauty', but all four of them died unmarried. One son, Albert Allen Meredith (1858–1863), died at a young age, but the others grew up to be collectively remembered as the Eight London Merediths, remarkable for the success they individually earned in legal, official and financial roles in London, Ontario; Toronto and Montreal, Quebec.

The youngest son, Llewellyn Meredith (1860–1933) J.P., of London, Ontario, was of a more retiring disposition than his seven elder brothers, but no less distinguished in his own field. He continued his father's successful business in loans and insurance, and like him also became a Justice of the Peace. He imported horses from England and Ireland (one of his first cousins there was married to a niece of the famous Irish trainer Henry Eyre Linde J.P., of Eyrefield Lodge, on the Curragh, who Llewellyn had known well) and bred them on his farm 'Ardaven', outside London. He achieved international acclaim as a judge of thoroughbreds and twice represented Canada at the Olympia Horse Show in London, England. He was also a trustee of the Victoria Hospital, London, Ontario.

Law

Four of the eight sons had careers in law, and all four of them not only took silk, but were all offered elevation to the Bench. Two of them – Sir William Ralph Meredith and Richard Martin Meredith – went on to become chief justices for the province of Ontario. The other two – Edmund Meredith (1845–1921) and Thomas Graves Meredith – remained as Queen's Counsel's, the latter serving as City solicitor for London, Ontario. Chief Justice Sir William Collis Meredith of Quebec (father of the prominent Montreal lawyer, Frederick Edmund Meredith), was their father's first cousin.

Another of their father's first cousins, Sir James Creed Meredith of Dublin, was the father of Judge James Creed Meredith. Their uncle, William Rice Meredith (1814–1888), was President of the Law Society of Ireland, and his sons (their first cousins) included: Richard Edmund Meredith P.C., Master of the Rolls in Ireland; Llewellyn Meredith (1885–1967); and Frederick Walsingham Meredith (1859–1924), also President of the Law Society of Ireland and the father of Sir Herbert Ribton Meredith, Chief Justice of the Patna High Court.

Finance

The remaining three brothers entered the financial world, the most prominent of whom was Sir Vincent Meredith, President of the Bank of Montreal. His younger brother, Charles Meredith, was President of the Montreal Stock Exchange. The third brother directly involved in finance was John Stanley Meredith (1843–1920), the number two in command (general manager) at Canada's second largest Commercial bank, Sir Hugh Allans Merchant's Bank of Canada. Another brother, Thomas Graves Meredith, though a lawyer, was also President of Canada Life Assurance. The brother's cousins, Frederick Edmund Meredith and his elder brother, William, both served as directors of the Bank of Montreal. In Ireland, their father's uncles, Walter and John Redmond (1770–1822), founded Redmond's Bank in Wexford which was described as "one of the very few provincial private banks that attained a conspicuous position, had a long and successful career, and ceased, leaving a sweet savour of solvency and honourable dealing".

Education

Richard Martin Meredith was a founder, Chancellor and the first chairman of the board of governors for the University of Western Ontario, where he endorsed the R.M. Meredith Society. Sir William Ralph Meredith was Chancellor of the University of Toronto and Sir Vincent Meredith was a Governor of McGill University. Their father's first cousin, Edmund Allen Meredith, was the 3rd Principal of McGill University in the 1840s, and a nephew of the 29th Provost of Trinity College, Dublin, Richard MacDonnell. Their cousin, Frederick Edmund Meredith, was Chancellor of Bishop's University, and his son, William Campbell James Meredith, was Dean of the Faculty of Law at McGill University.

Politics

Unlike their father's first cousin John Edward Redmond (1806–1865) and his family, in politics the London Merediths, as a group, did not feature as prominently. Sir William Ralph Meredith was a member of parliament and leader of the Ontario Conservative Party. He was honorably retired after a series of electoral defeats, but later declined the invitation of Prime Minister Sir Charles Tupper to join his Cabinet. Edmund Meredith (1845–1921) was both an Alderman and Mayor of London, Ontario, but as a conservative he unsuccessfully contested for the seat of North Middlesex, Ontario. The Meredith family as a whole had a general distaste of politics and though many were encouraged to enter the political world, except for the two already mentioned, the rest declined.

Legacy

Only five of the eight Meredith brothers married. Adding to the family's wealth and influence in Canadian society, Sir Vincent Meredith married a daughter of Andrew Allan, Chairman of the Allan Line and the Merchant's Bank etc. Charles Meredith married a daughter of Richard B. Angus, co-founder of the Canadian Pacific Railway and President of the Bank of Montreal etc., and Thomas Graves Meredith married a daughter of The Hon. Sir John Carling P.C., President of the Carling Brewery etc. But, of the five brothers who married, only three of them had children, and within only one generation of the eight brothers, all of the male descendants of this family were dead. In 1916, Sir Vincent Meredith had been created the 1st Baronet of Montreal for his wartime services to Canada, but as one of the five who died without children this title became extinct on his death. The remarkable family of John Walsingham Cooke Meredith is survived today through the female descendants of Edmund Meredith, and Sir William Ralph Meredith.

== Memorials ==
John Meredith bore an unmistakable resemblance to his mother's family, most notably seen in his cousin's grandson, John Redmond. On May 24, 1881, he died along with nearly two hundred others in the disaster that struck the Victoria steam-boat at London, Ontario. His son, Richard Martin Meredith, presented a chime of eleven church bells along with the tower clock to St. Paul's Cathedral (London, Ontario) in memory of his parents. The bells were cast in conjunction with the clock by Messrs Gillett & Johnston of Croydon, Surrey, and were first rung on Christmas Day, 1901. The inscription on the bells reads, In memory of John Walsingham Cooke Meredith, born May 9, 1809, died May 24, 1881; and Sarah, his wife, born July 4, 1819, died September 12, 1900.

Along with most of his family, John and his wife were buried at the Meredith Monument at Woodlands Cemetery in London, Ontario, the plot being marked by a tall celtic cross. There are also four memorial windows to the Merediths designed by Louis Comfort Tiffany in St. Paul's which feature the names of all of Meredith's family, donated by another son, Sir Vincent Meredith, and his wife.

One of the buildings at the Victoria Hospital, London, Ontario, is dedicated to his eldest daughter, Isabella Magdalene Meredith (1841–1907), and Meredith Avenue, also in London, is named after his sixth son, Thomas Graves Meredith. In Montreal, Charles Meredith House now serves as part of McGill University, named for his seventh son, and similarly, Lady Meredith House is named for the wife of his fifth son, Sir Vincent Meredith. The family is also remembered through a number of trophies, cups, scholarships and endowments donated by them.

== Related newspaper articles ==
- Victoria Steamboat Disaster, May 24, 1881
- The Irish Standard Bearer, The Irish Canadian, May 28, 1879
- The Meredith Family, Montreal Gazette, May 22, 1934
- Two Fine Canadian Families taken from the Toronto Daily Star, Oct., 31, 1945.
- One of Noted Family, T.G. Meredith Dies, Toronto Daily Star, October 29, 1945
- Complex Personality of Ontarios Chief Justice (William Ralph Meredith), The Toronto World, July 27, 1913
- Member of Family of Noted Brothers R.M. Meredith Dies, Ottawa Citizen, May 21, 1934
- Obituary of Sir Vincent Meredith, Montreal Gazette, February 25, 1929
