= Joseph Marks =

Joseph Marks was the editor and creator of the labour newspaper the Industrial Banner which began publishing in 1899 which "was the official organ of the Labour Educational Association of Ontario".
