= Thomas Graves Meredith =

- Born: 16 June 1853; London, Province of Canada
- Died: 18 October 1945 (aged 92); London, Ontario
- Education: Galt Collegiate; University of Toronto
- Spouse: Jessie Carling (m. 1882)

Thomas Graves Meredith KC (16 June 1853 – 18 October 1945) Canadian lawyer and businessman; President of Canada Life Assurance and President of the Middlesex Bar Association. Meredith Avenue in London, Ontario is named for him.

== Early life ==
Born in London, Ontario, he was the sixth son of John Walsingham Cooke Meredith, a first cousin of Sir William Collis Meredith, Edmund Allen Meredith and Sir James Creed Meredith. Tom Meredith was named after his great uncle, the Rev. Thomas Meredith, who married a daughter of Richard Graves, Dean of Ardagh in Ireland. He was the last surviving brother of the remarkable Eight London Merediths, that included Chief Justice Sir William Ralph Meredith, Chief Justice Richard Martin Meredith, Sir Vincent Meredith and Charles Meredith.

He was educated at the old Helmuth Boys College in London, and then the Galt Collegiate Institute and Vocational School, then known as the Tassie School, from where he passed his entrance exams and matriculated at the University of Toronto. He did not graduate from the university, instead becoming a law student in the offices of Messrs Scatcherd & Meredith, of which the senior partners were Thomas Scatcherd and his eldest brother, William Ralph Meredith.

== Career ==
Meredith was called to the bar of Ontario as a barrister and a solicitor in the Easter Term of 1878, and joined the firm he had articled with, Scatcherd & Meredith. When his brother, William, left London in 1895, Meredith was made City Solicitor of London, a position he held until his death.

1895 also saw him go into partnership with Robert Grant Fisher, under the firm of Meredith & Fisher, until Fisher was appointed a judge of the Supreme Court of Ontario. The firm of Meredith & Fisher, barristers, enjoyed one of the largest and most lucrative practices in Western Ontario. Meredith was also associated in partnership with (later Judge) George E. Taylor, (later Chief Justice) David MacDonald and at the time of his death, H.R. Davidson, of the firm Meredith & Davidson.

He was appointed King's Counsel in 1902, and was elected a Bencher of the Law Society of Upper Canada in 1920, succeeding the late A.H. MacDonald, K.C. He was re-elected at the Quinquennial elections of 1921, 1926 and 1931, becoming a life Bencher in 1936. He was also a trustee of the Middlesex Bar Association for a quarter of a century, serving as president from 1902 to 1909.

In politics, like his brother, William, he was a staunch Conservative. He declined the nomination to contest for a seat in Parliament for London, just as he also declined to accept a Judgeship. He also declined taking office in the Corporation Counsel of Toronto. The Law Society of Upper Canada remarked that, "He was for several years an outstanding Counsel of the London Bar being Solicitor for the Bank of Montreal and specialized in Municipal Law."

He was a founding member of the London and Western Trust Company in 1896, and was for many years (since 1907) associated with the Huron & Erie Mortgage Corporation and Canada Life Assurance. He served as President of both of these institutions, and though retiring in 1943 due to declining health, he remained as Chairman of the Board of both until his death.

== Family ==
At London, in October 1882, Thomas Meredith married Jessie, daughter of Sir John Carling of the Carling Brewery and Hannah Dalton. They were the parents of two sons, Stanley and Redmond Meredith, both who died unmarried. Stanley Meredith worked with Martha Allan in promoting the Little Theatre Movement in Canada. Thomas Graves Meredith was the last surviving brother of a remarkable family of eight brothers. He died at 565 Talbot Street, London, the home his father had built in the early 1840s, and where he was born. After his death the house was bought by the Department of National Defence and used as army officer's quarters. 'Meredith House' was demolished in 1966. Meredith Avenue, London, is named for Thomas Meredith.

== Newspaper articles ==
Sir William Meredith May Be New Lieutenant-Governor - Rumors that... T.G. Meredith will become Appeal Court Justice
