= James Creed Meredith (baronet) =

Sir James Creed Meredith
- Born: 17 September 1842; Chatham, Kent
- Died: 1912
- Known for: Deputy Grand Master of the Grand Lodge of Ireland, Chancellor to the Diocese of Limerick, Secretary to the Royal University of Ireland, Secretary to the National University of Ireland

Sir James Creed Meredith (17 September 1842 – 23 January 1912) was Deputy Grand Master and Treasurer of the Grand Lodge of Ireland; Chancellor of the Diocese of Limerick; Secretary to the Royal University of Ireland and the National University of Ireland. A prominent Freemason, J. Creed Meredith Masonic Lodge at Belfast was named in his honour. He is not to be confused with his son, Judge James Creed Meredith.

== Early life ==
Born at Chatham, Kent, where his Anglo-Irish father was stationed as Commandant of the 13th Somerset Light Infantry. He was the son of Major Richard Martin Meredith (1792–1869) and his wife Adelaide (1803–1870), daughter of James Creed (1756–1844) of Uregare (also known as Newlawn House), near Kilmallock, County Limerick. His mother's family had lived at Ballygrennan Castle near Kilmallock, since the 17th century but her uncle divided up the land after his only daughter, Mrs Eliza (Creed) Bowyer Bower, removed with her husband to Iwerne Minster House, Dorset. When Meredith's father – a lifelong friend and correspondent of Robert James Graves (whose sister married his brother Thomas Meredith) – was eventually offered to purchase a colonelcy, he instead retired and invested in just over 1,000 acres of land in County Cork, while living at St Stephen's Green in Dublin, where Meredith grew up.

== Law and education ==
In 1863, Meredith graduated from Trinity College Dublin in History and English Literature. He entered Gray's Inn at London and was called to the Irish Bar in 1864, becoming a Doctor of Laws (LL.D) in 1868. Meredith practised as a barrister at the Four Courts until 1878, when he was appointed secretary to the Endowed Schools Commission. On the establishment of the Royal University of Ireland in 1880, he was appointed one of the joint secretaries, and this office he filled until 1909, when the new National University of Ireland was brought into existence, and he became secretary to that new institution. He was knighted in 1899 in recognition of his services to education, and in 1910 attended the coronation of George V.

== Anglican Church ==
Throughout his life, Meredith had taken an interest in the welfare of the Church of Ireland, and for many years he was an attendee at the annual meetings of the General Synod in Dublin. His views on the financial business of the Church always commanded attention, which led him to be appointed Chancellor of the diocese of Limerick and one of the two honorary lay secretaries to the Synod.

When the Church of Ireland made an appeal on behalf of the Auxiliary Fund, which was established to provide against losses in investments in consequence of the depreciation of Irish land stock, Meredith gave assistance. He spoke at a number of meetings which were held at Dublin in support of the appeal. He was also a member of the Representative Church Body of Ireland, and took a part in the compilation of the reports which were annually issued. He was a member of the legal, financial and executive committees of the Representative Body; a member of the Diocesan Synod of Dublin; Governor of the Diocesan Board of Education and a member of the Trinity College Divinity School Special Committee.

== Freemasonry ==
Meredith joined the Order in 1869. In 1899, on the death of R.W. Shackleton K.C., he was appointed Deputy Grand Master of Ireland by James Hamilton, 2nd Duke of Abercorn, who was the Grand Master. He took a deep interest in the work of the Masonic Orphan Schools in Dublin, of which he was a vice patron. In 1898, a new Masonic Lodge (Number 253) was established at Belfast and named in his honour, known as J. Creed Meredith Lodge. His portrait hangs in the Masonic Hall at Dublin, in full masonic regalia. The Masonic Veterans' Association said "there were few more familiar figures in the public life of Dublin than Sir James Creed Meredith".

== Family ==
Meredith was married three times. His first wife, Florence Hargrave, was a member of one of Ireland's best known architectural families, being a granddaughter of Abraham Hargrave of Ballynoe, County Cork, and a first cousin of Sir Thomas Newenham Deane. Her father was William Hargrave, President of the Royal College of Surgeons, Ireland in 1853. They were the parents of one surviving son, before she died. This son was Richard Meredith (21 May 1867 – 7 January 1957) who became Chief Engineer of the Indian Telegraph Department in 1916. His second wife, Catherine Carew Meredith, was a daughter of one of his first cousins, and the sister of Richard Edmund Meredith, Master of the Rolls in Ireland. The marriage took place on 29 January 1870. She died without children. His third wife, Eleanor Graves Meredith, was a daughter of another of his first cousins, Rev. Richard Graves Meredith (the eldest son of his uncle Thomas Meredith), by his second wife Eleanor, daughter of Eliza Scott of Coolmain Castle and John Howe J.P., of Glanavirane House, Howe's Strand; High Sheriff of County Cork. They were the parents of seven children, who included Judge James Creed Meredith and the Ven. Ralph Creed Meredith. Meredith, together with his wife, lived at Clonewin House, 83 Pembroke Road, Dublin. They also kept a country residence on 38 acres of land at Closes, County Cork, inherited from Meredith's grandfather. He died at his Dublin home, 23 January 1912. Sir J. Creed Meredith was a nephew of Sir Edward Newenham Meredyth, and a first cousin of John Walsingham Cooke Meredith, Sir William Collis Meredith and Edmund Allen Meredith.
