= James Creed Meredith =

Irish lawyer and judge

Judge of the Supreme Court
- In office 5 May 1937 – 14 August 1942
- Nominated by: Government of Ireland
- Appointed by: Domhnall Ua Buachalla

Judge of the High Court
- In office 11 March 1924 – 4 May 1937
- Nominated by: Government of Ireland
- Appointed by: Tim Healy

Personal details
- Born: 28 November 1875 Fitzwilliam Square, Dublin, Ireland
- Died: 14 August 1942 (aged 66) Blackrock, Dublin, Ireland
- Spouse: Lorraine Seymour Percy (m. 1908)
- Relations: Sir James Creed Meredith (Father); Rowan Gillespie (Grandson)
- Children: 3
- Education: Trinity College, Dublin; King's Inns

James Creed Meredith (28 November 1875 – 14 August 1942) was an Irish judge who served as a Judge of the Supreme Court from 1937 to 1942 and a Judge of the High Court from 1924 to 1937. He was best known as a nationalist of the early 20th century who upheld Brehon Law. He was President of the Dáil Courts and a Chief Judicial Commissioner of Ireland.

He was selected by the League of Nations to oversee the 1935 Saar status referendum. He was also a noted scholar, philosopher and author, whose 1911 translation of Immanuel Kant's Critique of Judgement is still widely used by students today. In 1896, he won the British championship for the Quarter mile race. He was the grandfather of the bronze casting sculptor Rowan Gillespie.

== Early life ==
Creed Meredith was born at 17 Lower Fitzwilliam Square, Dublin, in 1875. He was the son of Sir James Creed Meredith and Ellen Graves Meredith (1848–1919), his father's third wife and the daughter of his father's first cousin, Rev Richard Graves Meredith (1810–1871), of Timoleague, County Cork, elder brother of Sir William Collis Meredith and Edmund Allen Meredith. James was a nephew of Sir Edward Newenham Meredith (1776-1865), 9th Bt, and a brother of Ralph Creed Meredith and Llewellyn Meredith (1883–1967). He was a cousin of Richard Edmund Meredith, Master of the Rolls in Ireland.

Meredith was educated at Trinity College, Dublin, receiving a master's degree. In 1896, while a student at Trinity, he became the British Quarter Mile Champion, running the distance in 52 seconds and beating Fitzherbert of Cambridge, the championship holder. Coincidentally, his future brother-in-law, Howard Meredith Percy (1879–1902), won for Canada the inter-collegiate championship in the half-mile and mile runs when at McGill University. After university, Meredith began a legal career, becoming a barrister.

== Career ==
In 1914, Meredith had approached Sir Thomas Myles to use his yacht, the Chotah, to land guns for the Irish Volunteers at Kilcoole. Meredith himself helped out aboard the Chotah during the operation with his friends Erskine Childers and Edward Conor Marshall O'Brien. Meredith was unusual amongst Protestants and graduates of Trinity College, Dublin, the sole constituent college of the University of Dublin of his era, in that he was an active supporter of Sinn Féin and the revolutionary Dáil government between 1919 and 1922. He served as the Dáil Supreme Court president from 1920 to 1922.

Although a republican – with a small 'r' – Meredith became a pacifist and a member of the Irish Proportional Representation Society. He was a founding member of the United Irish League along with fellow pacifist and writer Francis Sheehy-Skeffington, the painter Dermod O'Brien, William O'Brien, M.P. and Michael Davitt. In 1917, Meredith campaigned with George William Russell and Sir Horace Plunkett for the establishment of the Irish Convention in an attempt to find a way around the Unionist stonewall against self-government.

After Sinn Féin's landslide victory in the 1918 general election, and the unilateral declaration of independence, the Dáil appointed Meredith to chair a committee of lawyers to draw up a constitution for the newly declared Irish Republic, working closely with his cousin, Arthur Francis Carew Meredith, K.C. Two years later the new Dáil Courts system was set up to replace the English-law based court system. Meredith was appointed President of the Irish Supreme Court over Arthur Clery because he was by then a King's Counsel (a senior barrister).

After the War of Independence, some Dáil deputies argued that elements of the Brehon law should be incorporated into the legal system of the new State. Meredith was among those who supported this view. In 1920, on an appeal by a deserted wife and child seeking compensation or support from her husband, Meredith pronounced that English Law was retrograde in this matter and that he would give his judgment by the spirit of Brehon Law. He awarded the woman compensation and thus became the last known Irish judge to appeal to the ancient Irish law system. However, Laurence Ginnell and others in the judiciary who supported this initiative of reviving aspects of Brehon Law took the losing anti-Treaty side during the subsequent Civil War (1922–23), and so the project came to nothing.

Following the Anglo-Irish Treaty, the Irish Civil War and the collapse of the Irish Republic, the newly established Irish Free State did not abandon Meredith's talents. He was appointed Chief Judicial Commissioner of Ireland on 14 August 1923, served on the High Court from 1924 to 1937, and then on the Supreme Court of Ireland until his death. He was elected to the National University of Ireland 's Senate, a position he held until his death. In 1934, he was asked by the League of Nations to oversee the Saar valley plebiscite on the French/German frontier, and in 1937, he returned to the Supreme Court of Ireland.

== Personal life ==
In 1908, at St. George's Church, Montreal, Meredith married Lorraine Seymour Percy, the daughter of Charles Percy (1852–1918) of Weredale Park, Montreal, 'one of the great railway geniuses of his era', and a niece of Arthur Trefusis Heneage Williams. Mr Percy was "a great family man, devoted to cultivated society and an admirer of fine arts, particularly music, and a lover of nature and his family fireside." Percy had come from England to Canada in 1876 at the legacy of the Chicago and Grand Trunk Railway Company to be their treasurer, later becoming a director of the Central Vermont Railway.

Lorraine's mother, Annie Redmond Meredith (1849–1930), was a daughter of Henry Howard Meredith (1815–1892) of Rosebank House, Port Hope, Ontario. She was a first cousin of James Creed Meredith's mother and a niece of the already mentioned Edmund Allen Meredith and William Collis Meredith. Mrs Annie (Meredith) Percy was a talented artist and "a woman of rare culture and charm, artistic in taste, and noted for her charitable works and activities associated with the Church of England, of which she was a communicant since childhood".

Lorraine Meredith was a great patron of various Irish artists and poets. She was particularly close to the painter Grace Henry, the wife of the better-known Paul Henry. Grace Henry's biographer described the two women as "slightly silly and full of fun". The two often travelled and painted together, and when Mrs Henry died in 1953, Mrs Meredith – then living in Cyprus – paid for her funeral. Mrs Meredith kept close ties with her Canadian relations. She frequently took her two daughters (Moira and Brenda) to stay with them, particularly at the country home in Livingston County, Michigan, of her uncle, Howard Graves Meredith (1856–1934), described by Lord Birkenhead as "a great character, and one of the most attractive and warm-hearted men I have ever met".

Their daughter Moira's son is Rowan Gillespie, the Irish bronze casting sculptor, whose latest work Proclamation is a memorial to the signatories of the Proclamation of the Irish Republic and, according to his biographer Roger Kohn, to his grandfather's dream of a Utopian society.

== Philosophy and writings ==
Meredith was remembered as a kind, intelligent and philosophical man. A polymath, he held doctorates in literature and law. He wrote a successful play and five books, the most notable of which was his 1911 translation of ' Kant's Critique of Aesthetic Judgement', still widely used today by English-speaking scholars of Immanuel Kant.

The Merediths' Dublin house, Hopeton, was a centre for well-known poets, writers, and artists of the time. They also kept a country residence, Albert House, at Dalkey. Never one to follow the crowd, he became a Quaker in later life and, after his death, 14 August 1942, was buried at the Friend's Temple Hill Cemetery, Blackrock, Dublin.

== Arms ==
Coat of arms of James Creed Meredith

Notes
Confirmed 1 March 1927 by Sir Nevile Rodwell Wilkinson, Ulster King of Arms.
Crest
On a wreath of the colours a demi-lion rampant Sable collared and chained Argent langued and charged with an ermine spot Or.
Escutcheon
Ermine a lion rampant Sable collared and chained Argent langued Or.
Motto
Heb Dduw Heb Ddim A Duw A Digon

== Works ==
- Kant's Critique of aesthetic judgement / translated with seven introductory essays, notes, and analytical index, Oxford, 1911 at Internet Archive
- Proportional representation in Ireland, Dublin and London, 1913 at Internet Archive
- (with Hector Hughes) The Increase of Rent and Mortgage Interest (Restrictions) Act, 1920, Dublin, 1920
- The rainbow in the valley, Dublin, 1939 (science fiction)
- Nell Nelligan: A romance of the Irish volunteers, Dublin, 1940 (a play)
