= Richard Edmund Meredith =

Richard Edmund Meredith PC (Ire) KC (18 November 1855 – 26 January 1916), was the Master of the Rolls in Ireland, a Privy Councillor and Judicial Commissioner of the Irish Land Commission.

== Career ==
Born at Summerhill, County Dublin, Meredith was the son of Isabella Agnes Standish, of Kinsale, County Cork, and William Rice Meredith, a prominent Dublin solicitor and sometime President of the Law Society of Ireland. His Irish cousins included the brothers Judge James Creed Meredith and the Ven. Ralph Creed Meredith. He was an uncle of the poet Monk Gibbon, the mathematician Carew Arthur Meredith and the Chief Justice of the Patna High Court, Sir Herbert Ribton Meredith.

Educated at Galway College, Queen's University of Ireland and Trinity College Dublin. Meredith entered Middle Temple in 1876 and was called to the Irish bar in 1879. He rapidly acquired an extensive practice, becoming a Queen's Counsel (Q.C.) in 1892, only thirteen years later, when the average time before taking silk was twenty years. He enjoyed an immense practice as a barrister, and was considered as an equity lawyer of the first rank. In 1894, he was admitted as a Bencher of King's Inns, Dublin, where he was for a long time the youngest member of that body by a considerable number of years. In 1896, he was appointed a Judge of the High Court of Justice in Ireland and a member of the Privy Council of Ireland. In 1898, he was appointed Judicial Commissioner of the Irish Land Commission, in which capacity he made his fame. In 1906, he was appointed Master of the Rolls in Ireland, a popular choice as he had never associated himself with party politics. He retired due to ill health in 1912 and died in the North of England, on 26 January 1916. On Meredith's death The Irish Times reported,

His youthful appearance on the Bench attracted the notice of strangers, but no person could have been present at any case without being struck by the easy mastery he possessed of every question raised by the contending counsel on each side... In private life Judge Meredith was extremely popular. After the toil of court there was no person who more thoroughly appreciated the pleasure of a social gathering, and he was frequently to be found at those concerts where a good song formed part of the entertainment.

At Dublin in 1880, he married Anne, daughter of John Pollock of Harcourt Street, Dublin, by his wife and cousin Elizabeth, the eldest daughter of Nicholas Purdon-Stoute of Newtown House, near Youghal in County Waterford, whose father (John Stoute Purdon-Stoute) had taken the name of Stoute on inheriting Newtown. The Pollocks were associated with Brooklodge, County Cork and Springmount, County Waterford. The Merediths were the parents of five children and lived at 31 Fitzwilliam Square, Dublin. Their eldest son, Lt.-Colonel William Rice Meredith CBE DSO (1882-1964), was a Gold Staff Officer at the coronation of King George VI and Queen Elizabeth.
