= Thomas Meredith =

Irish mathematician

Thomas Meredith FTCD (1777–1819) was an Anglo-Irish clergyman, Doctor of Divinity, fellow of Trinity College Dublin, and a distinguished mathematician who gave his findings before the Royal Irish Academy in Dublin. He is best remembered for his association with the poet Charles Wolfe and as the subject of a ghost story related in True Irish Ghost Stories and Memorials to the Dead.

Thomas Meredith

== Background ==
Memorial to Thomas Meredith at Ardtrea, erected by his sons, 1819

Born at Templerany House, County Wicklow, he was the eldest son of Ralph Meredith, Attorney, Exchequer and Justice of the Peace for County Dublin; and his wife Martha, daughter of Thomas Chaytor of Charlemont Place, Dublin, the owner of extensive lands in County Clare. Meredith's father, a member of the Royal Dublin Society, had chosen a legal career in Dublin and passed the management of Templerany (where his family had made their home since the late seventeenth century) to his younger brother, William Meredith, who lived there with his wife, Sarah Garrett of Janeville and Mount Pleasant House, County Carlow; niece of John Cole, 1st Baron Mountflorence, of Florence Court. Thomas Meredith was a grandson of the John Meredith of Templerany, who c.1750 had two portraits (one large, one small) painted with his whippet by William Hoare at Bath.

== Career ==
From his childhood home in Dublin on Harcourt Street, he was tutored by a relative, Samuel Crumpe, a first cousin of the better known Dr Samuel Crumpe. Meredith's father signed him into Trinity College Dublin, as a pensioner in 1791 (spelling his name 'Meredyth'). Two years later, in 1793, he was elected a scholar of the college, and in 1795 he graduated with a BA degree. Following university he spent the next few years managing his property in counties Wicklow, Wexford and Dublin, but using his spare time to work on new mathematical theories. In 1805, he took his M.A. and in the same year was elected a fellow of Trinity College, where he is remembered as a distinguished mathematician and according to the biography of Charles Dickinson was, "reckoned by many as the best lecturer and tutor of his time in college". At his Dublin home, 1 Fitzwilliam Square, he kept a collection of books and maps.

In 1842, an article was written for the Dublin University Magazine by Mrs Meredith's cousin, Robert Perceval Graves (brother of Charles Graves). It celebrated the achievements of Graves' friend Sir William Rowan Hamilton, stating that Thomas Meredith was astonished by Hamilton's extraordinary intellectual abilities.

In 1811, Meredith took a Bachelor of Divinity degree, and the following year he was awarded as a Doctor of Divinity. He retired his fellowship in 1813 to take the living of Ardtrea, County Tyrone, which was open exclusively to those who had held fellowships at Trinity College. The parish tithes amounted to £738 a year, but in addition to this the rector of Ardtrea also held stewardship over the manor of Ardtrea, making the living a particularly valuable one. Ardtrea House, the Rectory or Glebe house where he took up residence with his family, was described as "a large and handsome house built of hewn freestone" with a small Palladian-style Gate Lodge at the foot of the driveway. Meredith was remembered at Ardtrea for never turning a man away from his door, always having a silver coin for those who came to him in need.

He was Rector of Ardtrea for six years, until his death in 1819 at the age of forty-two. His father-in-law, Richard Graves, wrote, "and now another apparently most calamitous visitation presents itself, in the sudden death of my beloved and excellent son-in-law, by apoplexy, a disorder of which of all men he seemed least liable." The Freeman's Journal of Dublin reported, "Learned, amiable, and unassuming, Thomas Meredith was unfeignedly respected and sincerely beloved by his numerous acquaintance and friends, all of whom deeply deplore his premature departure. He has left behind him an amiable and disconsolate widow and a family of seven children, most of whom are yet too young to feel the irreparable loss which they have sustained". He was succeeded at Ardtrea by the orientalist, Edward Hincks.

== Legacy ==
The poet, Charles Wolfe, was much attached to, and a great admirer of Thomas Meredith. Wolfe was the author of the inscription on Meredith's memorial at the Church of Ardtrea and a previously unpublished epitaph for his tomb. The memorial is made of black and white marble and is surmounted by the Meredith family crest and coat of arms:

Sacred to the memory of THOMAS MEREDITH D.D., Formerly Fellow of Trinity College Dublin, And 6 years Rector of this Parish. A man who gave to learning a beauty not its own, And threw over Science and Literature the lustre of the Gospel And the sweet influence of Christianity. The talents which he clothed in humility And his silent and unobtrusive benevolence Were unable to escape the respect and admiration of society: But those who witnessed him in the bosom of his family And shared the treasures of his conversation Seldom failed to find the ways of wisdom more pleasant than before And to discover fresh loveliness in that Gospel Upon which his hopes and his ministry were founded He was summoned from a family of which he was the support and delight And from the flock to which he was eminently endeared On 2nd May 1819 in the 42nd year of his age By a sudden and awful visitation but he knew That his Redeemer lived. ‘Erected by his Sons’.

Charles Wolfe wrote a poem for Meredith, meant as a second epitaph intended for the tomb itself:

Here lies in this lone spot, this holy shade,
One less for earth than heavens high mansions made,
Whose virtues all in paths untrodden moved,
Too little known, alas! Too much beloved!
Whom talent, science, wisdom, goodness crowned,
With wreaths as gentle as these flowers around,
Whose modest beauty shun all common eyes,
To bless this sacred spot, these purer skies,
And like his bloom in home's sequestered Vale,
To him who gave them all their sweets exhale,
But us't to human praise he sought not such,
Unheeding all but his he loved so much,
Then be our task to fit our minds to raise
In purer Worlds a fitter song of praise,
For them alone to know his worth is given
Who lived on earth as Saints shall live in Heaven.

In a brief memoir to Charles Wolfe's life, published in 1842, The Ven. John A. Russell (Archdeacon of Clogher), introduces Meredith as follows,

The following letter (quoted below) gives an affecting account of the death of a valued friend, to whom he (Wolfe) had lately become particularly attached, the Rev. Dr Meredith, formerly a fellow of Trinity College, Dublin, and then rector of Ardtrea. He was esteemed one of the most distinguished scholars in the university to which he belonged. His genius for mathematical acquirements especially, was universally allowed to be of the first order; and his qualifications as a public examiner and lecturer were so eminent, as to render his early retirement from the duties of a fellowship a serious loss to the college. Of our author's talents he entertained the highest opinion; and his congeniality of disposition soon led him to appreciate fully the still higher qualities of his heart.

== Family ==
At Dublin on 7 July 1807, Thomas Meredith married Elizabeth Maria, the eldest daughter of Richard Graves and Elizabeth Maria, the eldest daughter of the Rev. James Drought of Ridgemount House, Ballyboy, King's County (County Offaly) and Ferbans, County Wicklow, a nephew of Theaker Wilder. Mrs Meredith, sister of Robert James Graves, was described as 'a lady of much culture and refinement, and possessed also of great energy and force of character.' They were the parents of seven children, first cousins of John Walsingham Cooke Meredith and Sir James Creed Meredith,

- Mary Anne Meredith, "both beautiful and accomplished.. A born actress, she could move her hearers to tears or laughter, and a musician too". She died young in Ireland.
- Rev. Richard Graves Meredith (1810–1871), of Timoleague, County Cork. Tall for his time at 6'4", he was educated at Trinity College Dublin, and afterwards he lived in London, where he was a close friend of the poet Thomas Campbell with whom he helped to found the Literary Association of the Friends of Poland, of which he was secretary. In 1841, he married Martha, daughter of Thomas Johnston J.P., of Fort Johnston, County Monaghan, and Maria, daughter of the Rev. Dr James Hingston (1755–1840) J.P., of Aglish, County Cork. In 1850, he married secondly Eleanor Howe, daughter of John Howe, of Glanavirane House, Howe's Strand, High Sheriff of County Cork, and his wife Eliza Scott, daughter of Benjamin Scott of Coolmain Castle, County Cork, first cousin of Francis Bernard, 1st Earl of Bandon. One of his daughters married his first cousin, Sir James Creed Meredith.
- Chief Justice Sir William Collis Meredith, married Sophia Holmes, granddaughter of William Holmes (Surgeon-General) and Colonel James Johnston (1724-1800)
- Harriet Meredith (1813–1906), married William Henry Kittson, brother of Norman Kittson, step grandsons of Alexander Henry the elder
- Ralph Henry Howard Meredith (1815–1892), of Port Hope, Ontario. His daughter married the brother of Colonel Arthur Trefusis Heneage Williams. His granddaughter, Lorraine Seymour Percy, married Judge James Creed Meredith, of Dublin, the son of his first cousin.
- Edmund Allen Meredith (1817–1899), Principal of McGill University, married Frances Jarvis, daughter of William Botsford Jarvis, of Rosedale, Toronto
- Thomas L. Meredith (1819–1843), died in Ireland

After Meredith's death, his widow moved their family back to Harcourt Street, Dublin. In 1824, but without the approval of her parents, she remarried her mother's widowed cousin, the Rev. (James) Edmund Burton, "who wasted every farthing of his Irish property before having the sense to migrate to Canada". According to Burton's nephew, Captain Sir Richard Francis Burton, Eliza had originally been his first choice of wife, but she had preferred Thomas Meredith to him.

Seemingly after Burton had squandered his property in Ireland, at the invitation of the 'Society for the Propagation of the Gospel in Foreign Parts', he went to Terrebonne, Quebec, becoming the county's first Anglican minister. The attraction may have been that with the job he was also granted 1,000 acres (4 km^{2}) of land. By the time he returned to Ireland, he had added another 1,447 acres (5.9 km^{2}) to his property, perhaps in an attempt to regain what he had lost in Ireland. After the death of his first wife, he returned home to find a new bride for his ten motherless children. On marrying the widowed Eliza Meredith, he waited until the summer of that year (1824) to return with his new wife and four of her children to his house and farm, 'Burtonville' (where the village of Sainte-Julienne, Quebec is found today), outside the village of Rawdon, Quebec, which was then a four-day journey north of Montreal.

They lived there until 1833 before settling at Cloyne, County Cork. Eliza 'conveniently' left all the Burton children by her husband's first marriage in Canada, according to them, 'in an unconcerned manner'. With Mr Burton she had a further six children. Thomas Meredith's widow died at 84 Great King Street, Edinburgh, the home of Major Robert Graves Burton M.D., of the 6th (Inniskilling) Dragoons, one of her sons by her second marriage, on 31 March 1855.
