= William Holmes (British Army medical officer) =

British medical officer (1762–1834)

William Holmes (1762–1834), M.D., J.P., was Surgeon-General to the British Forces in Canada; a magistrate and landowner at Quebec.

== Early life ==
Born at Stewartstown, County Tyrone. He was the son of William Holmes (d.1789) of Bray Island, Donaghmore, County Tyrone; formerly a Captain in the 4th (The King's Own) Regiment of Foot. His mother, Martha Stewart (1732–1805), was the daughter of Rev. Robert Stewart (1687–1746) of Gortnaglush, County Tyrone; Minister of Carland and "a man of considerable property". Robert Stewart was a grandson of Colonel Robert Stewart, of Irry and a first cousin of Andrew Stewart of Stuart Hall, Stewartstown, County Tyrone, de jure 7th Baron Castle Stewart.

== Military career ==
His mother's first cousin, George Stewart (grandfather of Field Marshal Sir George Stuart White), served as Surgeon-General of the British Forces in Ireland, and later President of the Royal College of Surgeons in Ireland. Under the auspices of this relation Holmes entered the medical department of the British army in 1787, stating that 'as was customary in those days I paid 400 guineas' for a commission. As Staff Surgeon to the 5th Regiment of Foot he was immediately posted to Quebec. From 1790 to 1791 he was in Detroit tending wounded Indians who had fought against the Americans, under Little Turtle and Blue Jacket.

When garrisoned in Niagara-on-the-Lake (then known as Newark), Upper Canada, he considered settling in the province. In 1792 he was granted 1,200 acres (4.9 km^{2}) in Pickering Township, where he bought more land and in 1796 was issued a town lot in Newark. In 1796 his regiment was transferred to Quebec and three years later he was appointed Surgeon-General (the Senior Medical Officer) to the British Forces in the Canadas, ending his plans to settle in Upper Canada

Travelling to Europe, Holmes returned to Canada to carry out his new duties. He established himself in civil practice at Quebec and was associated with the Hôtel-Dieu de Québec and the Hôpital Général, serving as physician to the nuns at both hospitals. Both posts were unpaid, but they carried prestige that was valuable in building up a clientele as, no doubt, did his position of Deputy Grand Master of the Lower Canadian Freemasons from 1805.

== Family ==
Holmes was married firstly in 1789 to Mary Anne (d.1803), the daughter and co-heiress of Samuel Jacobs (1710–1786), Seigneur of Saint-Denis-sur-Richelieu, Quebec. After her father's death she lived at the home of Edward William Gray, Sheriff of Montreal, as his ward. In 1788, Gray wrote to Michel Cornud of Quebec (father-in-law of Denis-Benjamin Papineau),

Our Ward, Mary Anne, has with my consent engaged herself to marry Mr William Holmes, Surgeon to the 5th Regiment, a young man of good character and has something independent of his surgery who I think will be as good a match as ever she could expect to meet with, and if you should be of the same opinion, I request that you will send me a license (by the return of the post), as I am of opinion that the sooner business of this sort is finished the better it will be for the lady, as she seems to be rather capricious occasioned perhaps by some sort of improper attachment...

William and Mary Anne were the parents of five surviving children:

- Matilda Jane Holmes (1792–1835), first wife of Major-General James Fogo (1787–1866) of Duchray Castle and Killorn, Stirlingshire
- Maria Holmes (1793–1863), married Major-General William Furneaux (1791–1862) of Swilly House, Devon, whose great uncle was Tobias Furneaux.
- Sophia Holmes (1794–1867), married Arthur Luce Trelawny-Collins (1789–1820) of Ham House, Devon; nephew of David Collins (lieutenant governor)
- William Edward Holmes (1796–1825), Surgeon of Quebec, married Ann Johnston (1788–1865), the daughter of Lt.-Colonel James Johnston, of Quebec, and a first cousin of James Irvine. William and Ann's son married a daughter of Bartholomew Gugy and their daughter married Sir William Collis Meredith
- Theresa Holmes (1800–1888), married an Irish cousin, Captain Montgomery Cairnes (1789–1877) of Dublin, uncle of John Elliott Cairnes.

His second marriage was in 1807, to Margaret MacNider (1764–1838), the widow of Colonel James Johnston (1724-1800). She was the sister of John MacNider and a niece of The Hon. Mathew MacNider. They had one daughter,

- Arabella Holmes (1808−1887), married her Irish brother-in-law's cousin, Colonel The Hon. Sydney Robert Bellingham, of Montreal and Castlebellingham, County Louth. From her father she inherited 15,000 acres (61 km2) of land in the counties of Buckland and Bellechasse that she used to help finance her husband's career in politics. They died without children at Castlebellingham in Ireland.

== Later life ==
Retiring on half pay from the army, Holmes became a keen farmer and owned well-kept properties along Chemin Sainte-Foy and the road to Cap-Rouge. He was an active member of the Agriculture Society, in which his farmers were prize-winners. By 1815, he owned 15,000 acres at Buckland and Bellechasse, later inherited by his youngest daughter, Mrs Bellingham. In addition to his rural holdings, he owned several town houses (which he leased out), and other property in Quebec City. Through his second marriage he became co-proprietor of the Dorchester Bridge.

He continued his now considerable medical practice in Quebec and in 1813 was appointed examiner of candidates for medical licences. In 1816 he became physician to the Ursulines and President of the Quebec Board of Medical Examiners. In 1817 he was appointed a member of the Vaccine Board, and in 1821 he became its vice-president as well as being appointed a Justice of the Peace.

In November 1816, Holmes was appointed Commissioner for the Relief of the Insane and Foundlings at Quebec. In this position he helped to secure much needed funds for additional accommodation and repairs and later for further improvements, acting as trustee to oversee the works. He attempted to introduce fresh air and exercise and to remove restraint in the treatment of the insane, as advocated by the French specialist and theorist Philippe Pinel, but continued overcrowding in the older cells undermined such care.

Known familiarly as the "Insane Physician," Holmes remained solely responsible for care of the insane and the only medical man on the commission for their relief, to which he was reappointed in 1830 and 1832. Holmes's son-in-law, whose father he was friends with, Sydney Robert Bellingham recalled Holmes in 1824,

A tall gray-headed sixty-year old gentleman with small eyes and a slight north of Ireland brogue... the old doctor wore a loose dressing-gown and slippers, and spent the greater part of his day at the Garrison Library, not a stone's throw from his residence, where he provoked much fun amongst the officers by his free and easy costume

According to Bellingham, Holmes had been 'generous and kind to his patients', had been well liked in the religious hospitals, and had frequently 'declined payment for his advice and medicines.' He never mastered French but he maintained a successful private practice. The Dictionary of Canadian Biography summarises his career,

In his appointive positions Holmes represented the medical establishment and British military and executive authority in a period of professional and political conflict and change. Although thrown by his offices into the debates, being neither an intellectual nor an innovator he did not play a leading role. As the system of health care and the medical profession became increasingly entangled in the political struggle between the assembly and the executive branch in the Lower Canadian legislature, Holmes tended to draw apart. If he had been quick-tempered as a young man, in later years he seems to have mellowed, living quietly with his family, yet "ever-activated," as he had earlier declared, "by the faithful discharge of [his] duties." Prosaic in outlook, Holmes outlived his contemporaries, in many ways an 18th-century practitioner to the end.
