= William Collis Meredith =

Irish-born Canadian judge

The Honourable Sir William Collis Meredith
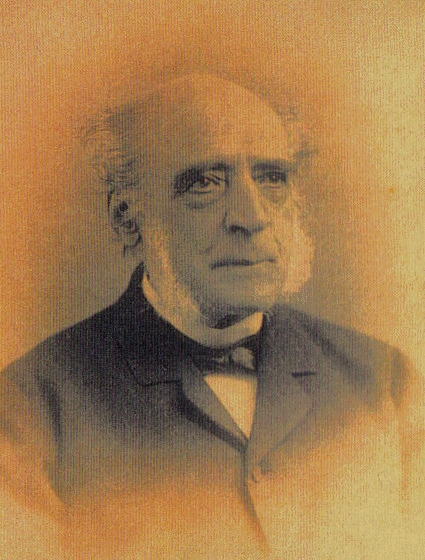

Chief Justice of the Superior Court for the Province of Quebec
- In office 1866–1884
- Preceded by: Hon. Edward Bowen
- Succeeded by: Sir Andrew Stuart

Personal details
- Born: May 23, 1812 Fitzwilliam Square, Dublin
- Died: February 26, 1894 (aged 81) Rue Ste.-Ursule, Quebec City
- Resting place: Mount Hermon Cemetery, Sillery
- Spouse: Sophia Naters Holmes

Sir William Collis Meredith, QC (23 May 1812 – 26 February 1894) was Chief Justice of the Superior Court for the Province of Quebec from 1866 to 1884. In 1844, he was offered but refused the positions of Solicitor General of Canada and then Attorney-General for Canada East - the latter position he turned down again in 1847. In 1887, he was one of the two English-speaking candidates considered by the Liberals for the role of Lieutenant Governor of Quebec. The home he commissioned and lived in at Montreal from 1845 to 1849 still stands today, known as the Notman House.

== Early life ==
Born May 23, 1812, at No.1 Fitzwilliam Square, Dublin, second son of the Rev. Thomas Meredith and his wife Elizabeth Maria Graves, the eldest daughter of the Very Rev. Richard Graves, Dean of Ardagh. He was named for his father's first cousin, William Collis (1788–1866) J.P., of Tieraclea House, High Sheriff of Kerry, a first cousin of Lord Monteagle. Meredith was a nephew of Robert James Graves and a brother of Edmund Allen Meredith. His first cousins included John Walsingham Cooke Meredith, Sir Richard Graves MacDonnell, John Dawson Mayne, Francis Brinkley, Major-General Arthur Robert MacDonnell and Sir James Creed Meredith.

A year after Meredith was born his family moved up to Ardtrea, near Cookstown, County Tyrone, his father having resigned his fellowship in Dublin to take up the position of Rector there. In 1819, Meredith's father died of 'a sudden and awful visitation' at his home while attempting to shoot a ghost with a silver bullet. His mother returned to Harcourt Street, Dublin, and he joined his Meredith and Redmond cousins at Dr Behan's school in County Wexford. Five years later, against her parents wishes, Meredith's mother remarried her mother's cousin, James Edmund Burton (1776–1850), a first cousin of Henry Peard Driscoll and an uncle of Sir Richard Francis Burton and Lady Stisted. Formerly a magistrate at Tuam, Meredith's step-father had "wasted every farthing of his Irish property" and so attracted by the land grants he took the position of the Church of England's first missionary to Terrebonne, Quebec.

In the summer of 1824, Meredith arrived at 'Burtonville', his stepfather's house and farm outside Rawdon, Quebec, then a four-day journey north of Montreal. He was tutored there by Burton himself or by whatever tutor his stepfather could procure, who were few and far between. In 1828, William's mother, "a lady of much culture and refinement, and possessed also of great energy and force of character", sent him back to Ireland to complete his studies at Trinity College Dublin.

In 1831, a year before his mother and stepfather returned permanently to Cloyne, County Cork, he chose to return to Montreal to commence his legal studies there. He articled under The Hon. Clement-Charles Sabrevois de Bleury and then James Charles Grant, QC, before being called to the Bar of Lower Canada in 1836.

== Duel and rebellion ==
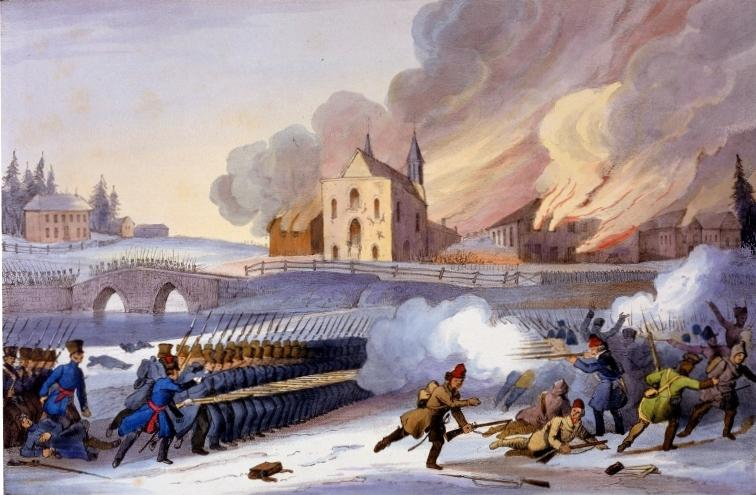
The Battle of Saint-Eustache, 1837, at which Meredith fought as a Lieutenant with the Montreal Rifles.

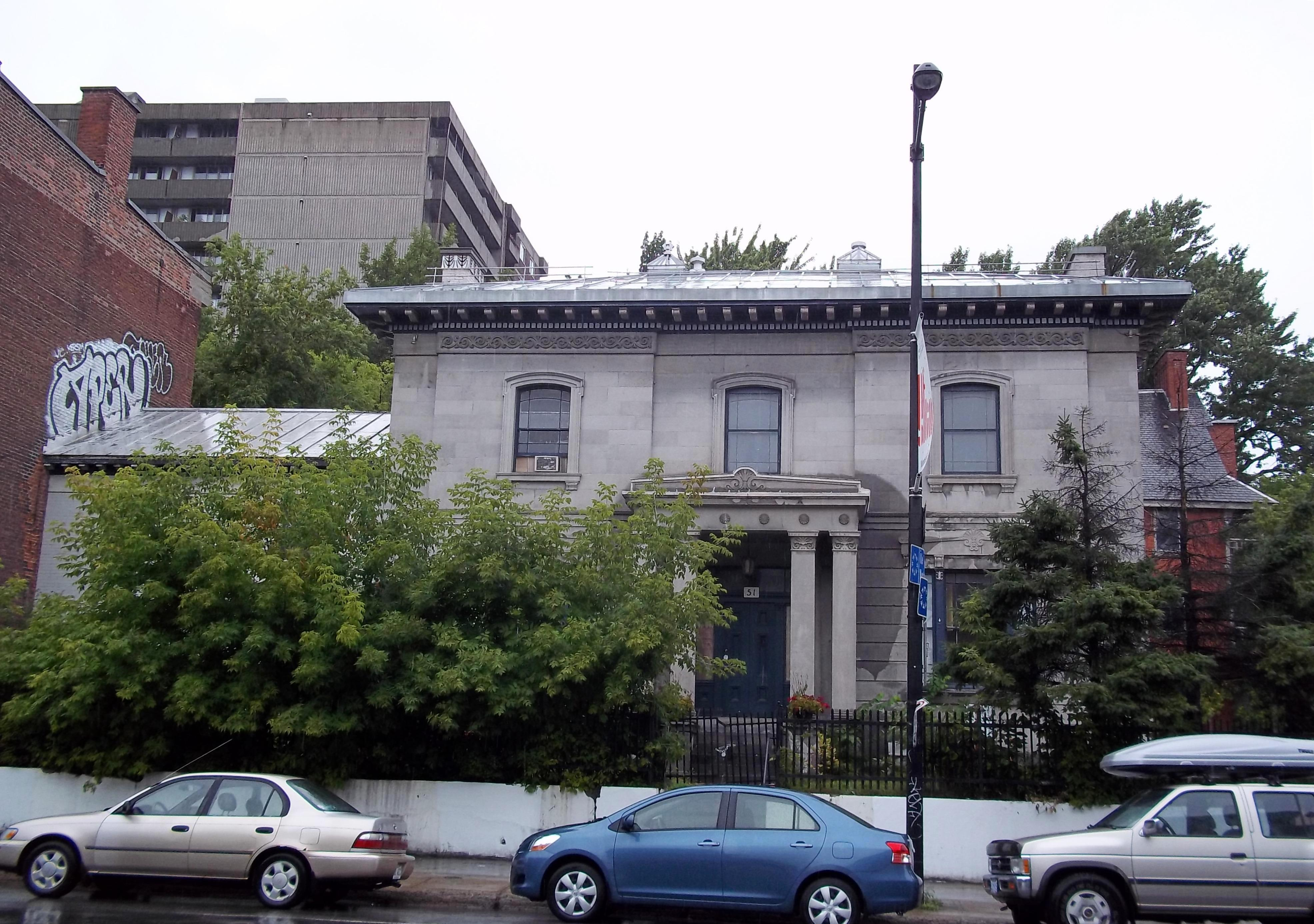
The Notman House in Montreal, was commissioned by Meredith when a 31-year-old bachelor. It was completed to the design of John Wells in 1845 and was Meredith's home until 1849.

On Monday, August 9, 1837, at eight o'clock in the evening, Meredith fought a duel with pistols against James Scott, no stranger to such events. Earlier that day, following a dispute over legal costs, Meredith challenged Scott. He chose James McGill Blackwood (son of John Blackwood) to second him, while Scott's choice was Joseph-Ferreol Pelletier. The duel took place behind Mount Royal, and the pistols used were Meredith's which he had bought in London, on a previous trip to England. On the first exchange Scott took a bullet high up in the thigh, and the duel was called to a stop. List of duels Meredith v Scott, 1837, under 'Canadian Duels'.

The bullet in Scott's thigh bone lodged itself in such a way that it could not be removed by doctors, causing him great discomfort for the rest of his days. Ironically for Scott, this was exactly where he had shot Sweeney Campbell in a duel when they were students. In the early 1850s (Scott died in 1852), when both the adversaries had become judges, one of the sights then to see was Meredith helping his brother judge up the steep Court House steps, Scott being still hindered by the lameness in his leg since their encounter.

Not long after the duel, his career was interrupted again by the Lower Canada Rebellion of 1837. Under the command of Lt.-Colonel Clément-Charles Sabrevois de Bleury, with whom he had articled with a few years previously, Meredith joined the Montreal Rifles as a Lieutenant and saw action against the French rebels at the Battle of Saint-Eustache, reaching the rank of Major in the militia.

== Montreal ==
From the late 1830s Meredith, "a careful, shrewd lawyer", was senior partner of the firm Meredith & Bethune (a relation through the explorer Alexander Henry the elder) and subsequently Meredith, Bethune & Dunkin. Their offices were situated at 33 Little St. James Street and the firm was described in the 1840s as the most influential in Montreal, having brought together the largest legal business by any one firm in the Province of Quebec. In 1843, he commissioned John Wells, to build him a home beyond the walls of Old Montreal on a spacious plot of land surrounded by fields, Elm and Maple trees. It still stands today, known as the Notman House.

In 1844, he was created a Queen's Counsel (Q.C.), declining the office of Solicitor General, and subsequently that of Attorney-General, which he declined again for the second time in 1847 during the Draper administration. Meredith disliked politics. In the same year Chief Justice Joseph-Rémi Vallières de Saint-Réal offered him the position of Dean of Law at McGill University, which he also turned down - a position his grandson, William Campbell James Meredith, later held.

He was one of the founding members and a director of the High School of Montreal, which was established with his help in 1843 and soon superseded the Royal Grammar School. He was counsel to the board of the Royal Institution for the Advancement of Learning and on the committee to save McGill University in the early 1840s. He conducted a good deal of business for the university, and it was with his influence that his younger brother, Edmund Allen Meredith, became the sixth principal of McGill from 1846 to 1853. In 1848, he was a founding director and trustee of the Montreal Mining Company along with Peter McGill, George Moffatt, Sir George Simpson, Sir Allan Napier MacNab and James Ferrier.

== Quebec ==
In December 1849, Meredith was appointed to be one of the first ten judges of the newly established Superior Court for the Province of Quebec, by the Lafontaine–Baldwin government, a position he held for ten years. However, this meant abandoning with some reluctance the practice of a profession to which he was greatly attached, and in doing so relinquished a profitable business in Montreal. During Lord Elgin's term as Governor General of Canada (1847–1854), Meredith was elected one of the judges of the Seigneurial Court. In 1859, 'at the earnest solicitation of the government and in compliance with the members of the Montreal bar', he accepted a seat from Sir George-Étienne Cartier, as a judge in the Court of Queen's Bench, that being the Court of Appeals for the province. Several of his judgments were spoken of very highly by the lords of the Privy Council in England. He filled the position for seven years 'with marked ability and success'. On December 28, 1854, he was given an honorary D.C.L. (Doctor of Civil Laws) from Bishop's University College, Lennoxville. In 1880, he received the honor for a second time, from Université Laval. In 1865, at a private meeting of the board of governors of Bishop's University he was unanimously elected to become the university's new Chancellor, but due to his existing official duties he declined the position. His youngest son, Frederick Edmund Meredith, would hold the position from 1926 to 1932.

Meredith's friend Sir John Abbott, who had studied law under him and later became Prime Minister of Canada, was a reluctant supporter of Canadian Confederation in 1866. Abbott feared that it would reduce the English-speaking inhabitants of Lower Canada to political impotence. Among others, he consulted with Meredith and Meredith's former business partner, Christopher Dunkin. They drafted a resolution calling on the government to protect the electoral borders of twelve English Quebec constituencies. Subsequently, Alexander Tilloch Galt endorsed the proposal, had the London Conference of 1866 accept it, and included it as Article 80 of the British North America Act, 1867.

In 1866, following the death of one of Meredith's closest friends, Edward Bowen, Sir George-Étienne Cartier appointed him Chief Justice of the Superior Court for the Province of Quebec. Judge Caron rivalled him for the position, but the influential and affable D'Arcy McGee (then Minister of Agriculture), a close associate of Meredith's brother (Edmund Allen Meredith), made a few favourable representations on Meredith's behalf, easing the way for his appointment to the position. In the years before his retirement he was the oldest judge on the Bench in Canada, 'still going with his characteristic energy and ability'. Chief Justice Meredith finally retired for health reasons, in this his final office, October 1, 1884. The government did their best to keep him from resigning his post, but Meredith declined their offers to accept leave of absence with the understanding that his full salary would be paid and his resignation subsequently accepted. Two years later he was created a Knight Bachelor by Queen Victoria. This is made clear from an article written in the French journal L'Electeur at his retirement,

La retraite de M. le juge Meredith va creer un vif chagrin dans le barreau comme parmi le public. Jamais en effet un magistrat ne sut mieux se concilier leftie des avocats sans cesse en rapport avec lui et la confiance du public. Jurisconsulte eminent, magistrat dont la reputation d'honorabilite a toujours ete au-dessus du soupcon, bienveillent pour tout le monde, d'un politesse vraiment exquise, M. le juge en chef va laisser une vide bien difficile a remplir.

In 1887, on the retirement of Louis-Rodrigue Masson as Lieutenant Governor of Quebec, the Liberal government favoured an English-speaking replacement. Along with his wife's cousin, George Irvine, Meredith was named as one of the two men, who if appointed, would bring the greatest satisfaction to the English-speaking minority. Neither Meredith nor Irvine were appointed, the new government instead choosing another French-speaking Quebecer, Sir Auguste-Réal Angers. At Meredith's death in 1894, the Legal News printed: The late Chief Justice was a diligent advocate and judge, and conscientious and painstaking in the performance of every duty. The opinions delivered by him from the bench have always been cited with the greatest respect and many of them are models of what a judicial opinion should be. They excel in clearness, are ample without ceasing to be concise, and bring light and satisfaction to the reader.

== Family ==
Sophia Naters (Holmes) Meredith

William Collis Meredith was married at Christ Church Cathedral, Montreal, May 20, 1847, to Sophia Naters Holmes (1820–1898). She was the eldest daughter of the late 'well-known and popular' William Edward Holmes (1796–1825), a Quebec surgeon (son of William Holmes) and a brother-in-law of Sydney Robert Bellingham. Mrs Meredith's mother, Ann Johnston (1788–1865), was the daughter of Lt.-Colonel James Johnston and his wife Margaret, sister of John MacNider. Mrs Meredith was one of seven siblings and half-siblings, but other than her only two were married: Her brother, William Holmes, married a daughter of Colonel Bartholomew Gugy, and their half-sister, Eliza Paul, married Major Stephen Heward (1776–1828), brother-in-law of Sir John Robinson, 1st Baronet, of Toronto. The Merediths were the parents of ten children:

- Sophia Elizabeth Meredith (1848–1927), married Henry Nicholas (Monck) Middleton (1845–1928) J.P., D.L., of Dissington Hall, Northumberland, and later Lowood House, near Melrose, Scotland. He was a brother of Sir Arthur Middleton, 7th Baronet, of Belsay Hall. Their son married a daughter of Albert Grey, 4th Earl Grey.
- William Henry Meredith (1849–1895), director of the Bank of Montreal. He died at a comparatively young age, unmarried, at the apartments he kept in the Windsor Hotel (Montreal).
- Matilda Anne Meredith (1851–1875), died young, unmarried, at Cannes, France.
- Edward Graves Meredith (1852–1938) N.P., of Quebec, married Isabella Agnes Housman (1858–1949), daughter of The Rev. George Vernon Housman (1820–1887), for 25 years Rector of Holy Trinity Anglican Cathedral, Quebec City, by his wife Eliza Izza Maria Reeves (1823–1865) of Hanover Square, London. George Housman was the uncle of the poet A.E. Housman and the grandson of Thomas Shrawley Vernon of Hanbury Hall.
- Harriet Meredith (1854–1941), married Harry Stanley Smith (1850–1916), a native of Seaforth near Liverpool, who retired to Addington House, Wimbledon.
- Hylda Graves Meredith (1856–1931), married George Hamilton Thomson (1857–1929), grandson of George Hamilton.
- Richard Holmes Meredith (1858–1868), died young.
- Louisa Meredith (1860–1938), married her half first cousin Lt.-Col. Edward Hampden Turner Heward (1852–1930). His brother married the sister of Lord Atholstan.
- Frederick Edmund Meredith (1862–1941) K.C., D.C.L., of Montreal, married Anne Madeleine VanKoughnet (1863–1945), granddaughter of Colonel Philip VanKoughnet. They were the parents of William Campbell James Meredith.
- Evaline Bertha Meredith (1863–1868), died young.

== Private life ==
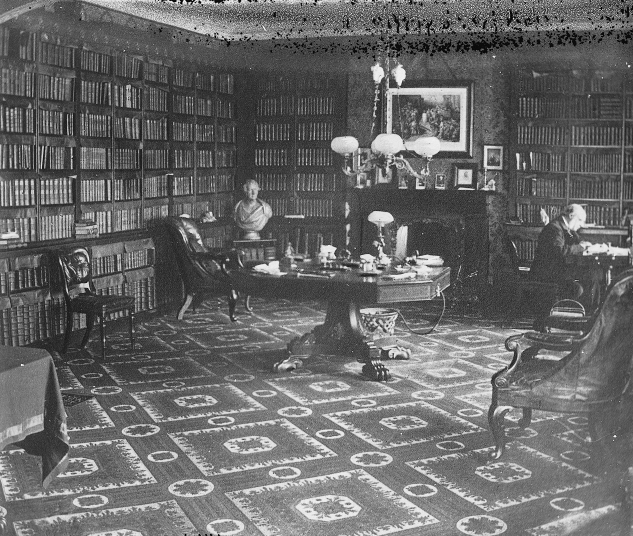
William Meredith at his home in Quebec City. The bust in the corner is of his uncle, Richard MacDonnell

On moving from their house in Montreal to Quebec City in 1849, the Merediths lived at 19 St. Ursule Street, a large, three storey, brick house with room for five live-in servants. In Christmas 1853, they entertained the author William Henry Giles Kingston and his new wife, Agnes Kinloch. In 1866, they built a summer house, 'Rosecliff' in the hamlet of St. Patrick, outside Rivière-du-Loup (where they owned 1,400 acres (5.7 km^{2}) of farmland), which is still occupied by his descendants today. In Quebec City, they owned three further houses and two barn stables; keeping five pleasure carriages, sleighs, two wagon-sleds, three horses and one milk cow. When he became financially independent in 1830, Meredith had purchased four town lots in Kent County, Upper Canada, that turned out to be an important investment in consequence of the railway that was built there.

Frances (known as Feo) Monck was the maternal granddaughter of Henry Monck, 1st Earl of Rathdowne and the sister-in-law of the then Governor-General Charles Stanley Monck, 4th Viscount Monck. 'Not generally given to benevolence in her judgments,' she gave an unusually long account of a party - or 'drum' as it was known - given by Judge Meredith in her book, My Canadian Leaves, An Account of a Visit to Canada, 1864–1865:

Dick (her husband, Lt-General Richard Monck) and I, and Captain Pem. (Sir Wykeham Leigh Pemberton) are going, I hope, to-night to a 'drum' at Judge Meredith's.... There was a very large party, and the house is large. I was much amused and talked to many people, among others to M. Duvergier-d'Hauranne, a young Frenchman, who is come over here to travel, and has brought a letter to the Governor-General from Lord Clarendon. His father (Prosper Duvergier de Hauranne) was a well-known man in France under Louis Philippe I. My friend, Sir R.M. (Sir Richard Graves MacDonnell, William's first cousin who spent a year in Canada as Governor of Nova Scotia in 1864) rushed to me, and asked me to walk about with him, and invited us to Government House (Nova Scotia) at H. (Halifax), which he told me was much finer and larger than 'Spencer's Wood'. Lady M (Lady Blanche MacDonnell) and Dick flirted together for a long time; she is so pretty and pleasant. A Miss Tilstone sang—a handsome girl with a pretty voice. Then a Madame Taschereau (a daughter of Robert Unwin Harwood) sang—good voice; and then THE man sang, Mr Antoine Chartier de Lotbinière Harwood (brother of Madame Taschereau) an M.P.P., half French. He has a very fine voice, and is a pupil of Garcia's. He was offered an engagement at the Italian Opera, London. The large rooms were too small for his voice, which wants modulation. I got quite giddy with the loudness of it ! He sang from operas; he wants expression and more teaching. Judge Meredith introduced him to me, and he sang again, for me !

Meredith frequently returned to Europe, either touring the continent with members of his family or visiting friends and relatives in Ireland. Rather than their stepfather, he and the rest of his siblings regarded their uncle, Rev. Dr Richard MacDonnell, as a second father. In 1853, Edmund Allen Meredith wrote in his diary that 'the doctor (as they referred to MacDonnell) spoke much of the splendid apples and cider William had sent him'. In return 'the doctor' insisted on opening bottle after bottle of claret for Edmund, 'to prove to William that it is now possible to find good claret in Ireland!'

== Obituaries ==
Chief Justice Meredith was 'a gentleman with exemplary charm and manners', and 'a man of fine scholarly attainments'. He possessed 'troops' of friends and was 'held in the highest respect in the City and Province of Quebec, by all classes of the community' and even more extraordinary for the time, was described as being as popular among the French as the English. This is noticeably apparent in an article written about him in L'Opinion Publique on 10 July 1879 :

Le Juge-en-Chef est l'urbanite meme, il est attentive comme un Francais de l'ancien regime. A cette grande affabilite qui n'est nulle part plus appreciable que sur le banc d'un tribunal. Le Juge Meredith joint un savoir etendu, un tact parfait, un judgement tres sur. Il voit au fond s'egarent, les avocats qui brouillent les faits, aux elements fondamentaux dont il faut s'inspirer pour retrouver la verite. Tout cela avec infiniment de benevolence et toutes les formes de la politesse.

"Esteemed for his high character, wide knowledge and amiable disposition", "his lofty conception of duty, his great learning, and his gentleness of character commanded the admiration and affection of the bench and bar of Quebec." Sir William Colles Meredith died 26 February 1894, aged eighty two after a short illness, and he was buried with many of his family at Mount Hermon Cemetery, Sillery. Part of the inscription on his gravestone reads, "... Thoughtful consideration for others marked all his acts and made bright his daily walk through life."
