= James Irvine (Quebec businessman) =

Canadian businessman and politician

Lt.-Colonel The Hon. James Irvine J.P., M.P. (1766 – September 27, 1829) was a businessman and political figure in Lower Canada.

James Irvine was born in England in 1766, the son of Adam Irvine (1736–1776) and Elizabeth (1731–1818), daughter of John Johnston (1696–1757), 3rd Laird of Outbrecks, Orkney. Irvine was a nephew of Lt.-Colonel James Johnston (1724-1800), of Quebec, brother-in-law of Mathew MacNider and grandfather of Lady Meredith. Adam Irvine, a merchant, came to Quebec City soon after James' birth. He formed a retail firm in partnership with John Munro that operated until 1797, when Irvine returned to England. The following year, he formed an import/export company with John McNaught and later James Leslie.

In 1801, he married Anne, the daughter of John George Pyke M.P., of Halifax, Nova Scotia, by his wife Elizabeth, sister of John Allan (colonel), two of the children of Major William Allan (1720–1790). Their son, Lt.-Colonel John George Irvine (1802–1871), served as A.D.C. to the Governor-General and was chosen to be acting adjutant-general to attend on the Prince of Wales (the future Edward VII of the United Kingdom) during his visit to Canada in 1860/61. James and Anne Irvine were the grandparents of George Irvine, Acheson Irvine and Commissary-General Matthew Bell Irvine (1832–1889) C.B., C.M.G., of the British Army. Deputy Controller Matthew Bell Irvine, C.B., C.M.G., second son of Lieut.-Col. J. G. Irvine, Dominion A.D.C. to the Governor-General, Matthew Bell Irvine married Charlotte Feodore Louisa Augusta, daughter of Rev. Narcisse Guerout, rector of Berthier, P.Q., June 2, 1875. Irvine served as chairman for the Quebec Committee of Trade from 1809 to 1822, and was President of the Agricultural Society of Quebec. He also was warden of Trinity House of Quebec. He was elected to the Legislative Assembly of Lower Canada for the Upper Town in 1810 and served until 1814. He was a member of the Executive Council from 1808 to 1822. Irvine served as a member of the Legislative Council of Lower Canada from 1818 to 1829. In 1824, he represented Lower Canada in the arbitration for the sharing of customs duties with Upper Canada. He was a member of the local militia, serving during the War of 1812 and eventually attaining the rank of lieutenant-colonel, and also served as justice of the peace. Irvine was a member of the Quebec Fire Society, serving as vice-president in 1807.

He owned a number of properties in Quebec and extensive farmland in the surrounding area. He lived with his family at his Sainte-Foy estate, Belmont House, which he bought for £4,000 in 1817 from his relation Sir John Caldwell (seigneur) 6th Bt., of Wellsburrow, Co. Fermanagh and Caldwell Manor, Quebec. Irvine was related to many of the foremost Anglo-Quebec families from the time of the British conquest of Canada. He died in Quebec City in 1829.
