= James Johnston (merchant) =

Scottish merchant (1724–1800)

Lt.-Col. James Johnston
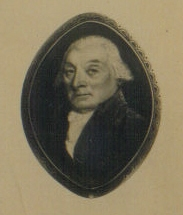
- Born: 25 January 1724; Stromness, Orkney Islands
- Died: 8 November 1800 (aged 76); Quebec City, Lower Canada

Lt.-Colonel James Johnston (25 January 1724 – 8 November 1800), J.P., was one of the earliest and principal Scottish merchants at Quebec following the fall of New France; of the firm Johnston & Purss. He was foreman of the first grand jury of the new British province of Quebec, justice of the peace, and colonel of artillery in the British militia.

== Early life ==
Johnston was christened at Stromness on 25 February 1724. He was the second son of John Johnston (1690−1757), 3rd Laird of Outbrecks on the Orkney Mainland, and his wife Marjorie Crafts (1695−1774), daughter of John Crafts who had been an ensign in Cromwell's army before becoming a ship-owner at London. The Johnstons/Johnstones of Outbrecks (sometimes spelt Outhrecks) were a prominent Orkney family and James' father - one of the principal merchants there - had added to their land by acquiring considerable property throughout the islands at Harray, Stenness and South Ronaldsay etc., owning one-third of the town of Stromness itself. Johnston's elder brother, Joshua Johnston (1720-1794), married an heiress of the Halcro family and lived at Orphir House, becoming the first Laird of Coubister; they were the ancestors of Henry Halcro Johnston. James and Joshua's sister, Elizabeth, was the mother of James Irvine, of Quebec City.

James Johnston was a cousin of Joseph Isbister (1710−1771), who in 1740 became the first Orkneyman to receive a governorship in the Hudson's Bay Company and settled in Quebec in 1760. Another of James's sisters, Katherine Johnston, had married George Geddes (1717−1791), great-grandson of Bishop George Graham. Geddes' father, David Geddes, aside from being Collector of Customs and owning a merchants bank and shipping business, also owned the first agency that supplied Orkney men for work in the Hudson's Bay Company, consisting of three quarters of their workforce in Canada. Through these connections, Johnston and his brother-in-law were in Quebec with General James Wolfe at the British Conquest of New France in 1759. He probably returned home soon afterwards, but by 1761, Johnston was renting a house in Quebec City and in July, the following year, he established a business partnership with John Purss who was to remain his partner and closest friend up until his death.

== Public Life at Quebec ==
From 1762, Johnston was appointed Captain of Artillery in the British Militia, retiring with the rank of lieutenant-colonel. In 1764, William Conyngham appointed Johnston foreman of the first Grand Jury of the new British Province of Quebec. Conyngham was a rival of Governor James Murray, and Murray's ally Attorney General George Suckling described the 14 jurors as "malcontents". Johnston and his jury favoured the wants of the merchants and they vigorously opposed Murray and Suckling's initiatives and policies, with Johnston signing his name to a letter demanding that the governor be recalled.

When Lord Dorchester was appointed Governor of Quebec in 1768, he recognised that Johnston had been "entering into Party against Mr Murray with too much warmth" but nonetheless recommended him to Lord Shelburne for a vacant seat on the Council of the province of Quebec, remarking that Johnston was "a man of very excellent understanding, and likewise very fit". However, despite reiterating the recommendation again in 1769, it was not acted upon. At various times, Johnston made open his support of Governor Henry Hamilton, Sir James Monk and Chief Justice William Smith, notably in bringing about the change to Quebec's legal system that brought it into line with that of England, and favouring the merchants.

In 1787, out of respect for Johnston, Lord Dorchester appointed him one of the commissioners to draw up plans, grant the land contracts and sales etc., for the construction of public buildings in Quebec City, but unfortunately for him they never came to the fore as the British authorities never approved Dorchester's ordinance.

== Business at Quebec ==
Johnston and Purss pursued a number of business opportunities, trading between Quebec, the British West Indies (where their firm was represented by the brother-in-law of Johnston's wife) and Scotland. For a time they owned a share of the Saint-Maurice ironworks and shares in the Dorchester Bridge, but they mainly traded in furs, seal oil and wheat. They also engaged in the trade of "essence of spruce for making beer", the discovery of which was attributed to Quebec distiller (and another of Johnston's brothers-in-law) Henry Taylor. Through Johnston's connections with the previously mentioned Geddes and Isbister families, Johnston & Purss did considerable business with the Hudson's Bay Company, and in that capacity he brought his nephew, David Geddes (1751−1811), to Quebec in 1768. On the outbreak of the American Revolution Geddes was given the rank of colonel and Paymaster of the Forces to General John Burgoyne, and with that army was taken prisoner after the Battle of Saratoga.

The two partners of Johnston & Purss had good personal relationships with many of the other principal British merchants of Quebec, particularly with Mathew Macnider and his brother, the Lymburners, Jacob Jordan and George Allsopp. Their firm had enjoyed considerable success before the American Revolution, but was only relatively prosperous afterwards. At the time of Johnston's death, his will included real estate valued at £5,252 consisting of Johnston's house and four others; ten warehouses; two wharfs and a piece of land comprising two building sites bought in 1782 at Beauport.

== Family and Final Days ==
In 1783, at Quebec City, James Johnston married the considerably younger Margaret MacNider (1764−1838), sister of John MacNider, 2nd Seigneury of Grand-Métis and Métis-sur-Mer; and a niece of The Hon. Mathew MacNider, Seigneur of Bélair, Grondines, Sainte-Croix etc. Mrs Johnston was an aunt of Mary MacNider (died 1855), the mother of Félix-Gabriel Marchand, 11th Prime Minister of Quebec and President of the Royal Society of Canada.

Johnston remained closely connected to his relatives in Orkney, and several generations later his great-grandchildren (and the Irvines) stayed as guests, and received in Quebec, his brother's descendants, the Johnstons of Coubister. In 1779, he sent his nephew (John Taylor, and afterwards his brother Henry), "for the best school education in England (at any expence) preparative to his becoming in time a good man and a compleat distiller", adding the proviso that "none of his time be murdered in Latin". Mr and Mrs Johnston were the parents of two children,

- John Purss Johnston (born 1785) J.P. In 1806, he married Amelia/Amalie Gugy, sister of The Hon. Louis Gugy, Sheriff of Montreal. They were the parents of one son, James Bell Johnston, who died unmarried.
- Ann Johnston (1788−1865). In 1806, she married her first husband Captain Abraham Paul (1782−1814) of the Royal Artillery, nephew of Sir Joshua Paul, of Paulville, County Carlow. They were the parents of three children, but only their daughter, Eliza Paul, married. She was the wife of Major Stephen Heward (1776–1828), brother-in-law of Sir John Robinson, 1st Baronet, of Toronto. Secondly, in 1817, Mrs Ann (Johnston) Paul married her step-brother William Edward Holmes (1796−1825), a Quebec surgeon. They had four children, two of whom married: William Holmes (to a daughter of Colonel The Hon. Bartholomew Gugy, sister-in-law of Sir Æmilius Irving) and Sophia Holmes (wife of Chief Justice Sir William Collis Meredith).

In 1807, after her husband's death, Mrs Margaret (MacNider) Johnston remarried William Holmes, Surgeon-General to the British Forces in the Canadas, and had by him one daughter,

- Arabella Holmes (1808−1887), married Colonel The Hon. Sydney Robert Bellingham. She inherited 15,000 acres (61 km^{2}) of land in the counties of Buckland and Bellechasse from her father that she used to help her husband's career in politics. They died without children at Castlebellingham in Ireland.

Colonel Johnston died on 8 November 1800, at his home on Rue Champlain, Quebec. After his death the firm of Johnston & Purss was dissolved and its property holdings were divided by lot between his widow, children (who were still minors) and Purss himself. As proof of the esteem in which Purss held Johnston, after the latter's death he cancelled a debt of £2,311 that Johnston owed him. Returning the favour, Mrs Johnston sold all Purss' household effects and furniture left by him to her in his will of 1803, raising a sum of £3,500, which she paid to his heirs in Britain.
