= Jean-Baptiste Bouchette =

Canadian merchant, mariner, and militia and naval officer (1736–1804)

Jean-Baptiste Bouchette (5 July 1736 – 28 April 1804) was a French Canadian merchant, mariner, and militia and naval officer.

Bouchette was born in Quebec to Saint-Malo-born seaman Marc Bouchette and Marie-Thérèse Grenet.

Bouchette established a fishing business in the Gulf of Saint Lawrence around 1760 and by 1765 was a well established merchant in Quebec City. In that year he established a partnership with Scottish emigrants John Purss and James Johnston to establish a trading post to serve the fur and fishing industries in the Gulf.

In 1773, Bouchette married Marie-Angélique Duhamel, daughter of Captain Julien Duhamel (1723–1778) and Marie-Angelique, daughter of Francois Dupolo Duval and Marie-Anne Boucher de la Bouteillerie (1675–1762). Madame Bouchette's father, like himself, was a native of Saint-Malo who settled at Quebec City in 1753. The Bouchettes were the parents of nine children, including Colonel Joseph Bouchette., who surveyed and described both the lower and upper province.

Bouchette fitted out and armed his own schooner for His Majesty's service during the American War. In 1775, Bouchette's schooner was armed to assist in the defence of Quebec against the American invasion. It served as one of the escort vessels for the convoy evacuating Montreal. She was burned by the rebels. When the convoy became trapped due to unfavourable winds, Bouchette piloted a small boat to help General Guy Carleton and Charles-Louis Tarieu de Lanaudière, his aide-de-camp, escape the American batteries.

In gratitude, Bouchette was granted a commission in an artillery company and on 28 April 1776 he was made a lieutenant of militia and given command of an armed sloop Hope. He served during the siege of Montreal, 1775–6. On 11 September 1777 he was made a master and commander and captained the Seneca, which patrolled the Great Lakes on Lake Ontario.

Bouchette was discharged in 1784. By 1788 Bouchette had returned to private life in Quebec, but it was not to last long. In 1791 he returned to Lake Ontario reappointed as master and commander in the Provincial Marine and by 1802-04 was the senior officer on the lake.

Bouchete became increasingly disillusioned with the military and in 1803, after a confrontation with a senior officer, he was brought in front of an inquiry which upheld three charges against him. Bouchette returned to Quebec and died on 28 April 1804.
