= John Purss =

Canadian merchant and militia officer (1732–1803)

- Born: 12 December 1732; Elgin, Scotland
- Died: 8 April 1803 (aged 70)
- Occupations: Merchant, militia officer

John Purss (12 December 1732 – 8 April 1803) was a Canadian merchant, militia officer, and office holder.

Purss was born in Elgin, Scotland in 1732, the son of a merchant there. He moved to Quebec after the British victory and, in 1762, entered into a business partnership with fellow Scot James Johnston. Their business traded wheat, iron, and seal furs and oil. The businessmen partnered with Jean-Baptiste Bouchette in 1765 to take advantage of his trading post and Gulf of Saint Lawrence fishery. They also bought a share of an ironworks in 1767, although they sold it a few years later. In 1770 they entered into a long-term lease for the King's Wharf in Quebec, a vital resource for commerce in the city.

In the 1780s the firm entered into a partnership with Johnston's brother-in-law, Henry Taylor, to run a distillery on Rue Champlain. With four stills, four boilers and eight evaporation tubs, the distillery produced spirits, beer and an invention of Taylor's called "essence of spruce for making beer", which was exported to New York and the West Indies.

By the end of the 1780s the partners owned shares in the Dorchester Bridge and owned a number of houses which they leased. Their fortunes seemed to decline in the subsequent decades as they sold property and the distillery, sublet the King's Wharf, borrowed money and sold their shares in the bridge. The partnership ended with Johnston's death in 1800. The firm's assets were split between Purss and Margaret Macnider, Johnston's widow.

Purss played a role in the city's public life. He was an important figure in the Quebec Fire Society. In 1787 Purss became a lieutenant in the militia and was promoted to captain around 1799. He served as assessor in 1797.

Purss died on 8 April 1803. Having never married, his estate was left to relatives in Britain and to his partner's widow.
