= Argenteuil (Province of Canada electoral district) =

Electoral district in former Province of Canada

Coordinates: 45.6°N 74.3°W

Province of Canada electoral district

Defunct pre-Confederation electoral district
- Legislature: Legislative Assembly of the Province of Canada
- District created: 1853
- District abolished: 1867
- First contested: 1854
- Last contested: 1863

The district of Argenteuil was a pre-Confederation electoral district in Quebec, Canada. It was established in 1853, under the Union regime of 1841.

Argenteuil was represented by one Member at the Legislative Assembly of the Province of Canada.

== Members of Parliament of the Province of Canada ==
- Sydney Robert Bellingham (1854–1860)
- John Joseph Caldwell Abbott (1860–1867)

== See also ==
- Argenteuil (electoral district)
- Argenteuil (provincial electoral district)
