= Notman House =

Coordinates: 45.511928°N 73.570064°W

- Maison Notman
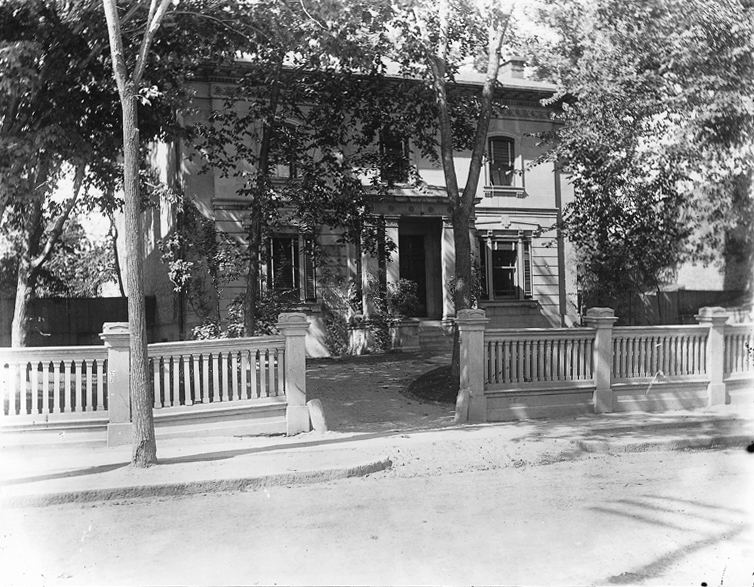
- Notman House in 1893
- Interactive map of the Notman House area

General information
- Type: Private house
- Architectural style: Greek Revival
- Location: East of the Golden Square Mile, 51 Sherbrooke Street W. Montreal, Quebec
- Construction started: 1843
- Completed: 1845
- Landlord: Sir William Meredith; Alexander Molson; William Notman; Sir George Drummond; Government of Quebec; OSMO Foundation

Design and construction
- Architect: John Wells

Notman House (French: Maison Notman) is a gathering place for tech startups, entrepreneurs and founders situated in a historic building at 51 Sherbrooke Street West in Montreal, Quebec, near the Golden Square Mile. Completed in 1845 for Sir William Collis Meredith, the house takes its name from the celebrated photographer, William Notman, who lived there with his family from 1876 until his death in 1891. The house is the only surviving residence of its era on Sherbrooke Street, and one of Quebec's few residential examples of Greek Revival architecture. It was classified as an historical monument and added to the Répertoire du patrimoine culturel du Québec on December 8, 1979.

== History ==
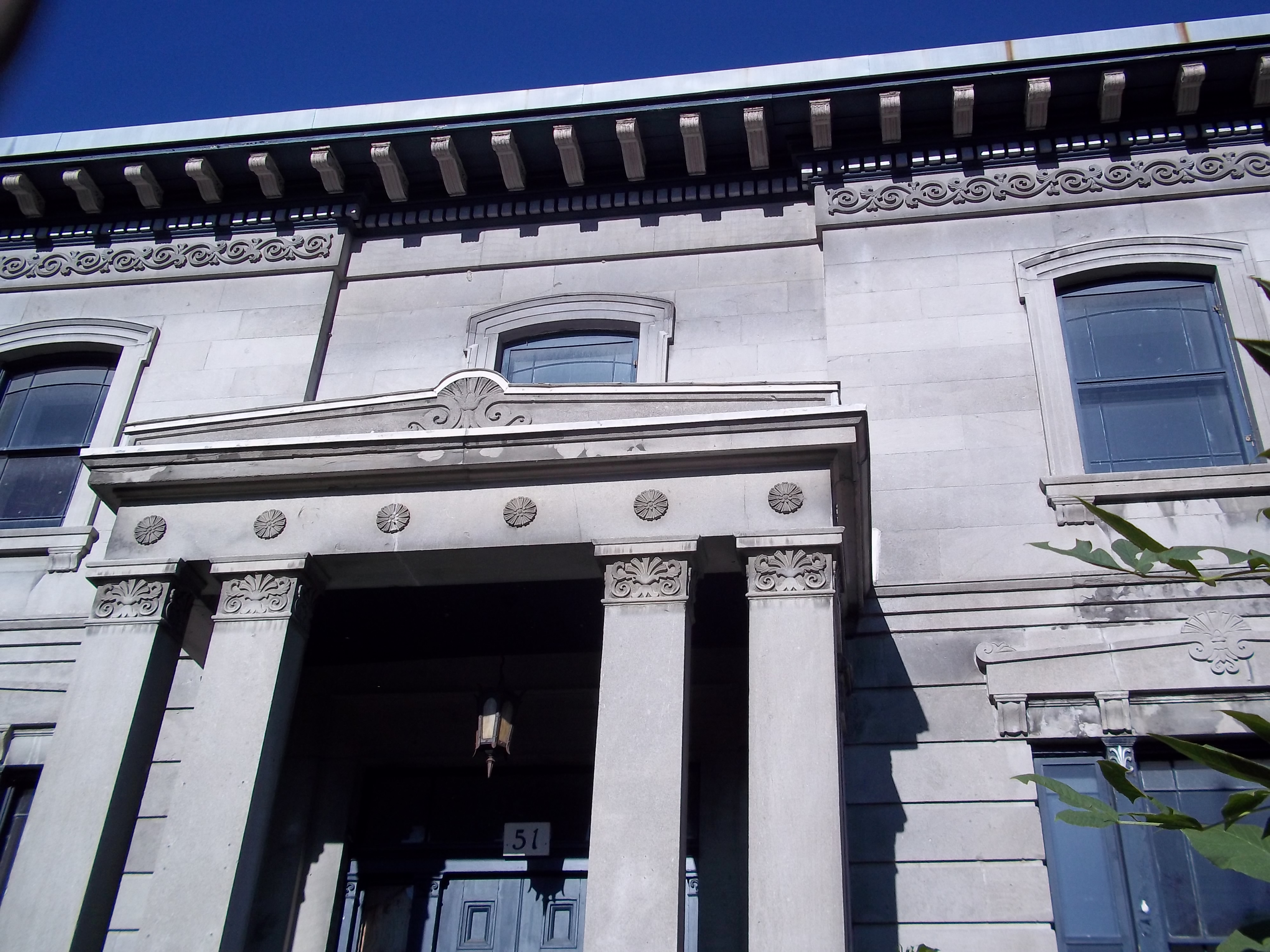
Facade of the Notman House, 2011

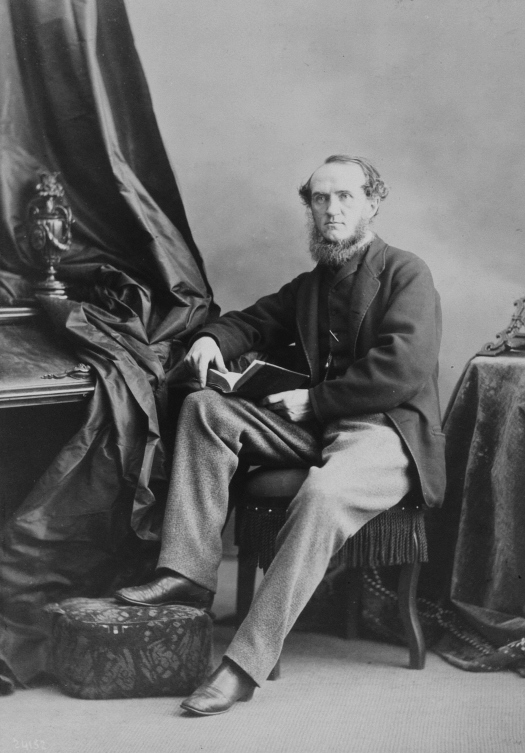
The celebrated photographer William Notman, from whom the house takes its name, lived here from 1876 to 1891

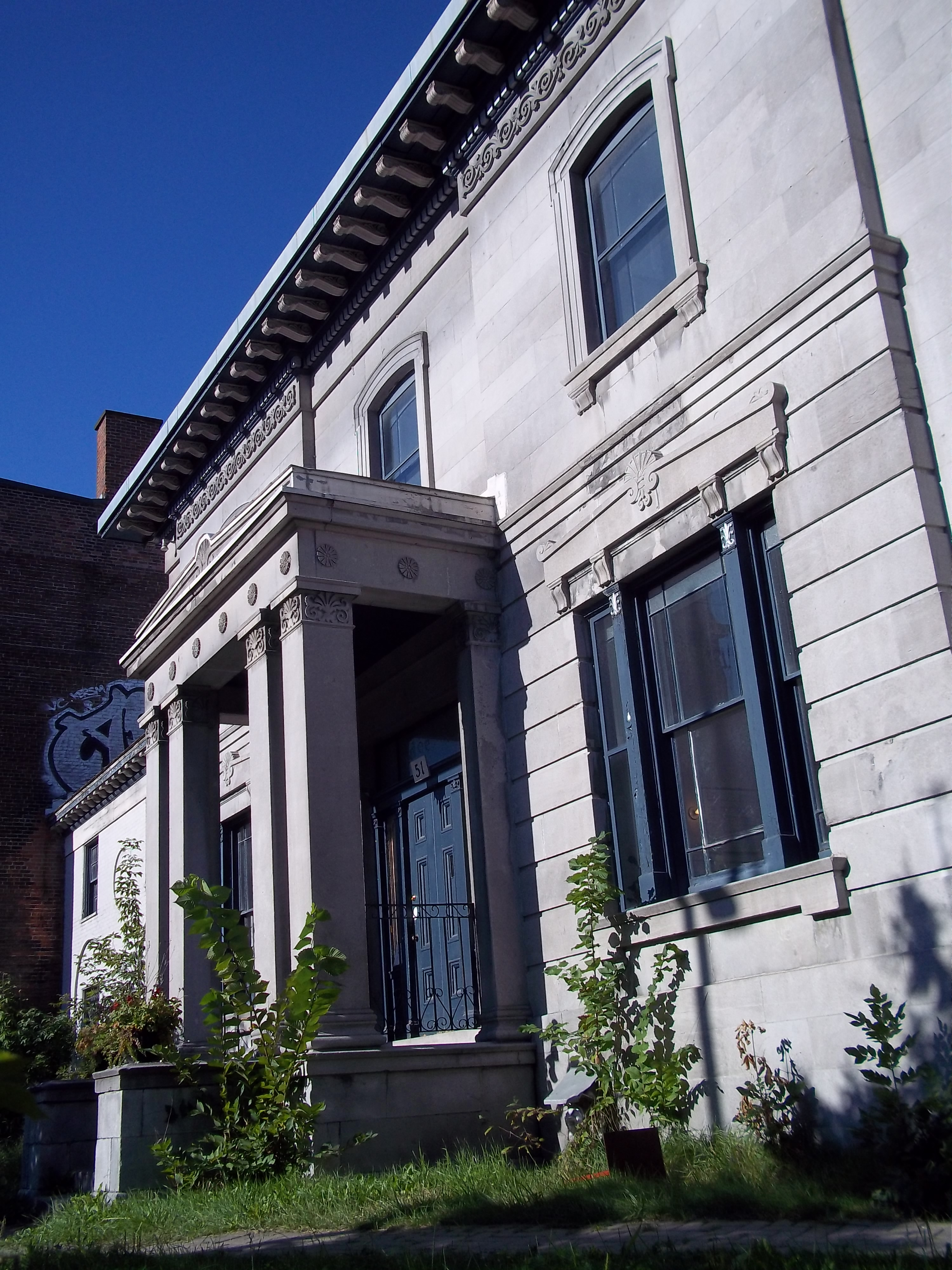
Notman House, 2011

The house was built for William Collis Meredith, the future Chief Justice of the Superior Court for the Province of Quebec. In 1843, Meredith, then a 31-year-old bachelor, commissioned John Wells to build him a new home beyond the confines of Old Montreal. Wells was then one of the best-known English architects in Montreal, whose work included the Head Office of the Bank of Montreal, Prince of Wales Terrace, and the Sainte Anne Market that housed the Canadian Parliament at Montreal until it was burnt down in the riots of 1849.

Meredith's new home was completed in 1845 within la Côte-à-Baron on Sherbrooke Street, then just a quiet country lane. The Meredith house was approached by a horseshoe driveway that was afterwards pushed back as Sherbrooke Street became a main thoroughfare. Meredith's house neighboured Belmont Hall, the Molson family home that once stood on the site today occupied by the gas station seen on the other side of Clark Street.

In 1849, a judicial promotion took Meredith to Quebec City. He leased the house to several prominent Montrealers including Thomas Evans Blackwell, President of the Grand Trunk Railway, before selling it to a grandson of John Molson – Alexander Molson (1830–1897) – who had grown up at the neighbouring Belmont Hall. In 1876, Molson sold the house to William Notman, the celebrated Scottish photographer whose collection of over 450,000 photographs form the basis of the Notman Photographic Archives kept at the McCord Museum in Montreal. It is from him that the house takes its name today, and he lived here with his family until his death in 1891.

After Notman's death, the property was purchased by Sir George Alexander Drummond, a wealthy philanthropist and future President of the Bank of Montreal. In 1894, Drummond purchased the house in order to donate it and its land to the Anglican community, the Sisters of the Society of Saint Margaret. Based on the plans of the architect Sir Andrew Thomas Taylor, they enlarged the house and built a hospital known as St. Margaret's Home for Incurables that was able to accommodate 50 patients. The Sisters of St. Margaret operated the hospital for almost a century until 1991, when financial responsibility for operating St. Margaret's passed from the Drummond Trusts to the Government of Quebec, and a new Centre d'Accueil St. Margaret was established at 50 Hillside Avenue in Westmount.

Since 2022, Les vies de la maison Notman, a research-creation project from Université de Montréal is led by writer and professor Catherine Mavrikakis on the St. Margaret's Home period of the Notman House. The project aims to allow the erased voices of patients and caretakers to resurface, and to allow better public knowledge of this less known vocation of the House.

In January 2011, the OSMO Foundation leased Notman House, making it available to internet entrepreneurs, early stage venture capitalists and the general public. On December 19, 2012, the OSMO Foundation acquired the property with the help of municipal, provincial and federal government grants, as well as private sponsors.

== Architecture ==
The architect, John Wells, stipulated that the neo-classical structure was to be constructed almost entirely with local materials, from the stone to the mortar which was made with sand from the Saint Lawrence River. The house had an inner court that was filled with greenery, and according to the 1991 Montreal Gazette article on the Notman House, 'the central hall plan of the house - symmetrically placed grand rooms off a generous corridor - followed the tradition of aristocratic domestic architecture in both Britain and the United States'. The portico is decorated with palmettes and rosettes. The house is considered a fine example of Greek Revival architecture and a typical example of several of the grand houses that once lined Sherbrooke Street in the Golden Square Mile from the 1840s.

== OSMO Foundation ==
The OSMO Foundation is a non-profit organization that aims to facilitate the transfer of knowledge, experience and relationships within the tech community in Montreal. Founded by members of the web community in Montreal, including investors, technology and media executives, the OSMO Foundation has spearheaded the Notman House initiative by financing the project through grants, sponsorships, and loans from government and private sponsors.

Since opening as a proof of concept in January 2011, the Notman Project has become a showcase for collaboration and the landmark in Montreal's startup scene. It is one of the five strategic innovation initiatives supported by The City of Montreal and became a pillar of the Strategy for Entrepreneurship announced by the Quebec Government in November 2011. In 2015, they started a brand new project titled Develop Cuba, to improve the tech startup industry in the technologically isolated country.

Notman House is also an event space. Non-profit events related to web and mobile are hosted free of charge. Examples include events such as hackathons and meetup groups. Since 2011, the house has hosted over 150 events.

Apart from having a number of paid co-working spaces, Notman House also has a cafe area, which can be used free of charge by those working on web and mobile projects. These initiatives were designed with the hope of attracting people in the web and mobile space under one roof. This is the idea behind the tagline "Home of the web", which was chosen by the OSMO Foundation.

== See also ==
- Lady Meredith House, another historic home in Montreal built for the son of Meredith's first cousin
- Golden Square Mile, a nearby historic mansion district
