= Colonne de la liberté (Quebec) =

Coordinates: 54°41′20″N 73°11′11″W

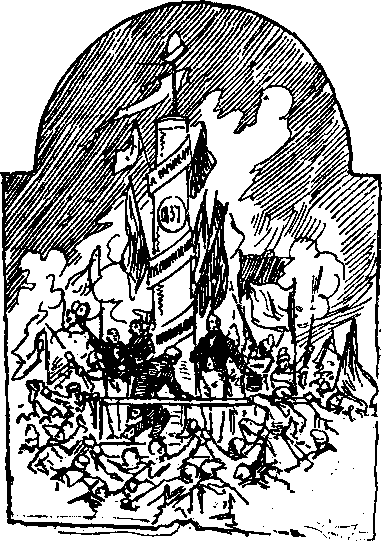
Illustration displaying the column during the Assembly of the Six Counties, drawn by Henri Julien for The Montreal Star.

The Colonne de la liberté (French for "Column of Liberty") was a symbol of the Patriote movement erected in Saint-Charles, Lower Canada (present-day Quebec), on October 23, 1837. Its name is identical to the column that marked the history of the French Revolution. In 1982, because of the Comité des Patriotes and the Quebec Ministry of Culture, a replica was raised on its presumed original location and still stands today.

On October 23 and 24, 1837, people of Lower Canada gathered around it for the Assembly of the Six Counties with the structure bearing the inscription "À Papineau ses compatriotes reconnaissants" (To Papineau his thankful compatriots), referring to Patriote leader Louis-Joseph Papineau. During the Lower Canada Rebellion of 1837, on November 30, Colonels George Augustus Wetherall and Bartholomew Gugy and their troops unearthed the column after the victory at the Battle of Saint-Charles and brought it to Montreal as a war trophy, along with a number of prisoners.

== See also ==
- Column
- Patriote movement
- History of Quebec
- Timeline of Quebec history
- Quebec independence movement
