= Bartholomew Gugy =

Canadian politician

Colonel The Honourable Bartholomew Gugy
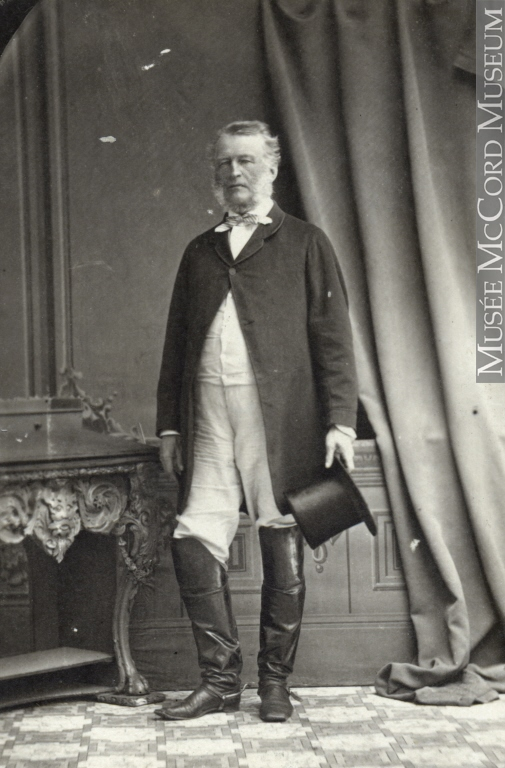

Conservative Member of the Legislative Assembly of Lower Canada for Sherbrooke
- In office 1831–1837
- Preceded by: Benjamin Tremain
- Succeeded by: Edward Hale

Conservative Member of the Legislative Assembly of the Province of Canada for Sherbrooke
- In office 1848–1852
- Preceded by: Edward Hale
- Succeeded by: Sir Alexander Tilloch Galt

Personal details
- Born: November 6, 1796 Trois-Rivières, Quebec
- Died: June 11, 1876 (aged 79) Beauport, Quebec
- Party: Conservative

Bartholomew Conrad Augustus Gugy (6 November 1796 – 11 June 1876) represented Sherbrooke in the Legislative Assembly of Lower Canada and the Legislative Assembly of the Province of Canada. He played a prominent military role in the Lower Canada Rebellion as Colonel of the cavalry at the Battle of Saint-Charles, afterwards seizing the Column of Liberty and carrying it in triumph back to Montreal. He was Police Magistrate at Montreal and Adjutant-General to the Militia of Lower Canada. He lived between Montreal and his father's manor house at Beauport. He was a large landowner having also inherited the Seigneuries of Yamachiche, Rivière-du-Loup, Grandpré, Grosbois, and Dumontier.

== Early life ==
He was born at Trois-Rivières in 1796, the son of Lt.-Col. The Hon. Louis Gugy and Juliana O'Connor. As a Huguenot, and the son of a Royalist Colonel of the Swiss Guard who served with the British Army too, he was admitted to the elitist school of the Reverend John Strachan in Cornwall, Upper Canada. He was the brother-in-law of Judge Samuel Wentworth Monk, nephew of Sir James Monk, Chief Justice of Lower Canada.

On the outbreak of the War of 1812, Gugy joined the Canadian Fencibles, becoming a lieutenant. He fought alongside his father and distinguished himself at the Battle of the Chateauguay. Afterwards, he studied law and was called to the bar in 1822. He quickly established a numerous and lucrative clientele for himself, but he was better known for his role in politics and the military. In 1831, Gugy was elected to the Legislative Assembly of Lower Canada for Sherbrooke, voting against the Ninety-Two Resolutions. He was re-elected up until the Lower Canada Rebellion of 1837. As one of the few Tories who spoke French, he readily engaged in verbal bouts with Louis-Joseph Papineau. Gugy fought with "supple oratory, using irony, banter, sarcasm, and insolence," exasperating his opponent.

== Lower Canadian Rebellion, 1837-38 ==
In 1837, when the Rebellion of Lower Canada was imminent, Gugy immediately volunteered with the Militia. Given the rank of colonel he led the cavalry at the Battle of Saint-Charles, and it is suggested that he personally seized the Column of Liberty before carrying it in triumph to Montreal with two subalterns.

At the Battle of Saint-Eustache he again distinguished himself by his enthusiasm. Following the battle, the French Canadian rebels falsely accused him of cruelty, and even of walking knee deep in the blood of the rebels, when in fact he had just brought his horse to water at the stoups of the church. Later, having billetted his troops at Saint-Hyacinthe, Gugy stayed at the house of Jean Dessaulles, where the children of his enemy Papineau had taken refuge. Gugy gave a wax doll to Ezilda Papineau and two picture books to Gustave Papineau.

== Subsequent career ==
Following the Rebellion, Gugy held the position of Police Magistrate at Montreal, and then from 1841 to 1846, he was appointed Adjutant-General to the Militia of Lower Canada. As Adjutant-General, the party of Sir Louis-Hippolyte La Fontaine frequently targeted him for not placing enough French Canadians in the higher ranks of the militia.

After the Union of 1841, Gugy failed to win the parliamentary seat for Saint-Maurice when the supporters of his opponent, Joseph-Édouard Turcotte, seized the polling booth. He had also been a candidate for his old seat in Sherbrooke but was defeated by Edward Hale. In 1848, he was returned to Sherbrooke by acclamation.

In the house, Gugy voted regularly against the ministry of Sir Louis-Hippolyte La Fontaine, and during the famous debate on the Rebellion Losses Bill, Gugy, with Sir Allan Napier MacNab, was the principal leader of the opposition. In 1849, his speeches fuelled the tension that finally exploded with the Burning of the Parliament Buildings in Montreal and the subsequent riots. Gugy reacted with his customary spirit on the night of the burning, seizing several of the agitators to stop them from setting upon the Speaker, Augustin-Norbert Morin. The next day, 26 April, Gugy climbed a lamp-post on the Champ de Mars and for two hours harangued the crowd that had gathered to launch an attack on the homes Sir Francis Hincks, Benjamin Holmes and his old enemy Sir Louis-Hippolyte La Fontaine, trying in vain to persuade them to disperse.

== Retirement ==
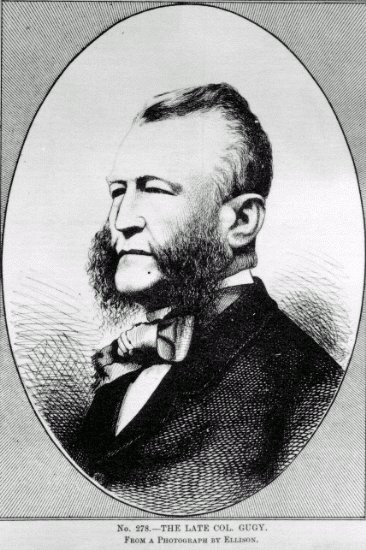
Bartholomew Conrad Augustus Gugy

After 1850, through fear of the annexationists, Gugy gradually drew away from the Montreal Tories, and did not run for election in 1851. Colonel Gugy was nevertheless appointed one of the Canadian representatives to The Great Exhibition in London. In 1853, he received another civil post as Inspector and Superintendent of Police at Montreal, but resigned the same year to retire to the estate at Beauport that he had inherited in 1840 from his father, together with the Seigneuries of Yamachiche, Rivière-du-Loup, Grandpré, Grosbois, and Dumontier. After a stinging defeat in 1854 at the hands of another Tory, James Moir Ferres, in Missisquoi-Est, he retired from politics for good. The Dictionary of Canadian Biography said of his character:

Hot-headed, irascible, endowed with a colourful nature, the bulky, loud-voiced colonel was not vindictive, or intolerant, or sectarian. As a seigneur, he collected his rents with regularity, but never resorted to vexatious measures.

Towards, the end of his life Gugy often returned to Quebec, riding erect on horseback despite his 78 years, to ensconce himself in the library of the Palais de Justice and regale the young of all ages with the details of his former litigations and addresses to the court. He does not seem to have had a fanatical temperament. If he was never popular among French Canadians, it is because he too often upheld principles which they rejected.

— Jacques Monet, "Bartholomew Gugy". Dictionary of Canadian Biography (online ed.). University of Toronto Press. 1979–2016.

== Family ==
Gugy was married twice, leaving children by his first wife only. In 1828, he married Louise-Sophie (1802-1842), the only daughter to reach adulthood of The Hon. Antoine-Louis Juchereau Duchesnay, by his wife Marie-Louise Fleury de La Gorgendière (1775–1832). Mrs Gugy was a niece of Captain Michel-Louis Juchereau Duchesnay, the elder sister of The Hon. Elzéar-Henri Juchereau Duchesnay and the sister-in-law of The Hon. Gabriel-Elzéar Taschereau. They were the parents of two daughters:

- Augusta-Louise Gugy (1828-1892). In 1851, she married Sir Aemilius Irving. They were the parents of eight children.
- Bertha-Louise Gugy (1829–1855). In 1849, she married William Edward Holmes (1822–1861), a young Montreal barrister. He was a brother-in-law of Chief Justice Sir William Collis Meredith and a grandson of William Holmes and Colonel James Johnston. They were the parents of two sons, William and Augustus Holmes.

In 1869, Gugy married secondly Mary McGrath (b. 1824), the daughter of a Michigan doctor who moved to Beauport. Bartholomew Gugy died at his family's seigneurial manor of Darnoc at Beauport, in 1876. He was buried at Mount Hermon Cemetery in Sillery, on 13 June 1876.

== Photographs ==
- Lt.-Col. Bartholomew C.A. Gugy, cira 1865 at Montreal
