= John Moore Neligan =

Irish physician

- Born: 1815; Clonmel
- Died: 24 July 1863 (aged 47–48)
- Occupation: Physician

John Moore Neligan (1815 – 24 July 1863) was an Irish physician.

== Biography ==
Neligan was the son of a medical practitioner, was born at Clonmel, County Tipperary, in 1815. He graduated M.D. at Edinburgh in 1836, and began practice in his birthplace. Thence he moved to Cork, where he lectured on materia medica and medical botany in a private school of anatomy, medicine, and surgery in Warren's Place. In 1840 he took a house in Dublin, and in 1841 was appointed physician to the Jervis Street Hospital. He also gave lectures on materia medica from 1841 to 1846, and on medicine from 1846 to 1857, in the Dublin school of Peter Street. He published in 1844 ‘Medicines, their Uses and Mode of Administration,’ which gives an account of all the drugs mentioned in the London, Scottish, and Irish pharmacopœias, and of some others. Their sources, medicinal actions, doses, and most useful compounds are clearly stated; and the compilation, though containing no original matter, was useful to medical practitioners, and went through many editions. He enjoyed the friendship of Robert James Graves, the famous lecturer on medicine, and in 1848 edited the second edition of his ‘Clinical Lectures on the Practice of Medicine.’ In the same year he published ‘The Diagnosis and Treatment of Eruptive Diseases of the Scalp,’ which was printed at the Dublin University Press. He describes as inflammatory diseases herpes, eczema, impetigo, and pityriasis, and as non-inflammatory porrigo, and gives a lucid statement of their characteristics in tabular form; but he was ignorant of the parasitic nature of herpes capitis, as he calls ringworm, and seems not to have noticed the frequent relation between eczema of the occiput and animal parasites. From 1849 to 1861 he edited the ‘Dublin Quarterly Journal of Medical Science,’ and published many medical papers of his own in it. In 1852 he published ‘A Practical Treatise on Diseases of the Skin,’ and, like most men who attain notoriety as dermatologists, issued in 1855 a coloured ‘Atlas of Skin Diseases.’ His treatise is a compilation from standard authors, with a very small addition from his own experience. The subject is well arranged, and so set forth as to be useful to practitioners. It was much read, and led to his treating many patients with cutaneous affections. His house in Dublin was 17 Merrion Square East. He married in 1839 Kate Gumbleton, but had no children, and died on 24 July 1863.
