= Sydney Robert Bellingham =

Canadian politician

Member of the Legislative Assembly of Quebec for Argenteuil
- In office 1867–1878
- Succeeded by: Robert Greenshields Meikle

Member of the Legislative Assembly of the Province of Canada for Argenteuil
- In office 1854–1860
- Succeeded by: Sir John Abbott

Personal details
- Born: August 2, 1808 Castlebellingham, County Louth
- Died: March 9, 1900 (aged 91) Castlebellingham, County Louth
- Party: Conservative, afterwards Liberal

Lt.-Colonel The Hon. Sydney Robert Bellingham (August 2, 1808 – March 9, 1900) was an Anglo-Irish businessman, lawyer, journalist, military and political figure in Canada East. He served as a captain with the Royal Montreal Cavalry during the Lower Canada Rebellion and represented Argenteuil in the Legislative Assembly of Quebec from 1867 to 1878. After the deaths of his three elder brothers he inherited Castle Bellingham and returned to Ireland to administer the estate

== Early years ==
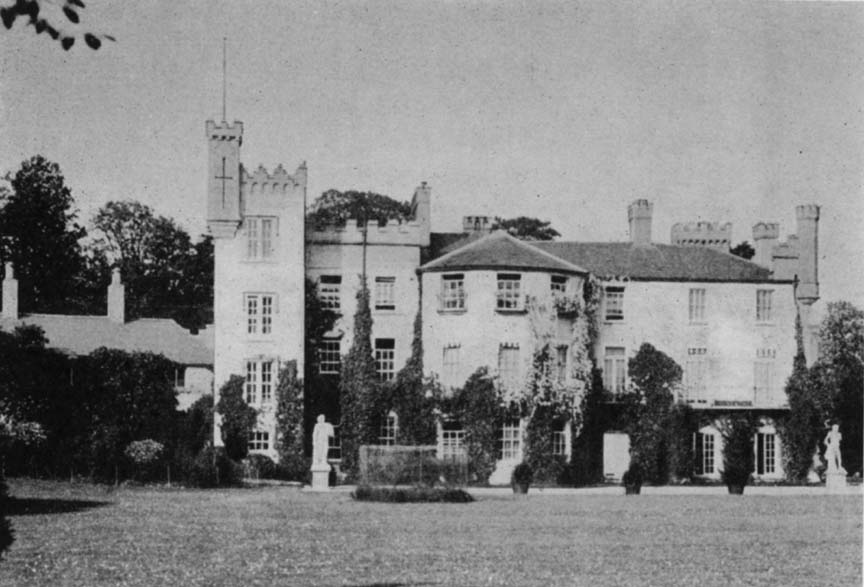
Castle Bellingham, County Louth; seat of the Bellinghams since 1660.

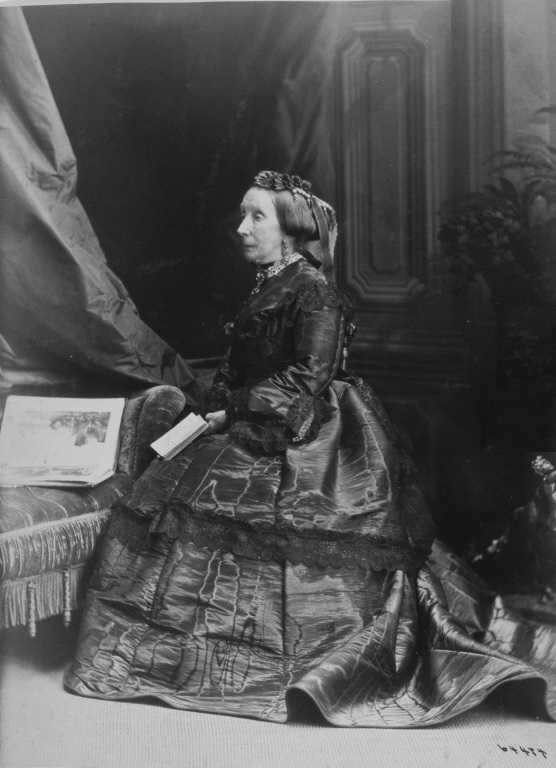
His wife, Mrs Arabella (Holmes) Bellingham, at Montreal in 1871

Born at Dunany House, Castlebellingham, County Louth, he was the fourth son of Sir Alan Bellingham (1776–1827) 2nd Bt., and his wife Elizabeth (1788–1822), daughter of the Rev. Rees Edward Walls of Boothby Hall, Lincolnshire. Sir Alan Bellingham was heir to his uncle, Sir William Bellingham M.P., but survived him by less than a year.

By 1824, Sir Alan Bellingham had run into financial difficulties and leaving his family in Ireland, he fled his debtors to France, taking up residence at Châtillon-sur-Loire. Then just fifteen years old, Sydney came to Canada alone to seek his fortune. Arriving in Quebec, he travelled widely throughout Upper Canada until 1827 when he took a job in the timber business at Montreal under another Anglo-Irishman, the brother of George Hamilton. A few months before his marriage, he started an import-export business with his friend James Wallis (1807–1893), formerly of Drishane Castle, County Cork, who had settled at Fenelon Falls.

In 1831, Bellingham married Arabella Holmes (1808–1887), to whom he was related through his grandmothers family. She was the youngest daughter of one of his father's friends, William Holmes of Quebec. Her family were well-connected in the Canadas and in addition to that she was the heiress to 15,000 acres (61 km^{2}) of land in the counties of Buckland and Bellechasse. After the failure of his business with Wallis, aided by his wife's money, Bellingham entered Canadian politics.

== Canadian Politics, Business & Military ==
In 1834, Bellingham was an unsuccessful candidate in Montreal East for a seat in the Legislative Assembly of Lower Canada. He opposed the reforms to government being proposed by the Parti Patriote. He was named a Justice of the Peace in 1837. During the Lower Canada Rebellion, Bellingham served as a captain with the Royal Montreal Cavalry and the aide-de-camp to Lt.-Col. George Augustus Wetherall. As a civil magistrate he led many daring raids deep into Patriote territory to arrest the rebel leaders during the war.

He studied law with Alexander Buchanan, and was called to the Lower Canadian bar in 1840, entering into practice with William Walker at Montreal. He also edited the Canada Times, a reform-oriented newspaper. Bellingham supported the reforms proposed by Lord Durham but opposed the union of Upper and Lower Canada. In 1843, he became editor of the Times and Daily Commercial Advertiser. Bellingham was a proponent of annexation with the United States and served as secretary of the Montreal Annexation Association. In 1853, he co-founded the Montreal and Bytown Railway.

In 1853, he bought a tract of land on the north brow of Mount Royal overlooking Montreal, where he and his wife made their home, Dunany Cottage, named for the house in which he grew up at Castlebellingham. In 1854, Bellingham was elected to the Legislative Assembly of the Province of Canada for Argenteuil. He bought 21,000 arpents of land there, bringing many settlers, both French and English to the area, aiding them to farm successfully. He was also made a colonel of the local militia, the Argenteuil Rangers. However his election was declared invalid twice after it was alleged that he had used intimidation and bribery but he was re-elected in the by-elections that followed and he finally took his seat in May 1856. He was elected again in 1858, his election was overturned in 1860.

After Confederation, he was elected to the Legislative Assembly of Quebec. In 1871, he criticized Joseph-Édouard Cauchon, another member of the assembly, for the deplorable conditions in his asylum which received government grants; this led to Cauchon's resignation. In 1871, he became editor of the Daily News of Montreal. Originally elected as a Conservative, Bellingham became a Liberal following the Tanneries scandal in 1874.

== Return to Ireland ==
Bellingham was recognized as 'one of the best political writers in Lower Canada'. In 1877, he was appointed president of the Lovell Publishing Company of Montreal, but the following year he and his wife returned to Ireland to take up residence at his ancestral home, Castle Bellingham, which he had inherited in 1874 after the deaths of his elder brothers. His ties with Montreal remained strong, always keeping abreast of Canadian politics. In 1895, he dictated his Canadian memoirs to his nurse, and they were published privately the year after his death by his nephew. He and his wife lived at Southgate House, Castlebellingham, where he died 9 March 1900, without children. In his will he left the Castlebellingham estate to his nephew, Sir Henry Bellingham 4th Bt., and all his personal effects to Edward Graves Meredith, the eldest surviving son of his niece, Lady Meredith.
