= Trinity House of Quebec =

- Established: 1805

Trinity House of Quebec (French: Maison de la Trinité de Québec) was a regulatory agency and tribunal for the port of Quebec and the St. Lawrence River from 1805 until its functions were transferred to the federal Department of Marine and Fisheries. It shares a name with Trinity House, which oversees lighthouses in England and Wales, and with Trinity House of Montreal, its counterpart in Montreal. William Lindsay was the first registrar. Its building is includesd in a database of Quebec's cultural heritage.
