= Mathew Macnider =

Canadian politician

Mathew MacNider (c.1732–1804) was a Scottish-born businessman, seigneur and political figure at Quebec. He was a Justice of the Peace and represented Hampshire County in the 1st Parliament of Lower Canada. He was the uncle of John MacNider, the pioneering 2nd Seigneur of Grand-Métis and Métis-sur-Mer.

== Biography ==
Born at Paisley in Scotland, he was a younger son of William MacNider (b.1660), of Balsarock (or Balsarach), Ayrshire. The MacNiders had held several small estates in Ayrshire since the early seventeenth century, but spurred by the conflicts between Britain and France during the eighteenth century, Mathew and his brother William (father of John MacNider and Mrs James Johnston) moved into the import-export business. The Protestant, seafaring MacNiders quickly became well established in Scottish shipping and trading circles.

Taking advantage of the British Conquest of New France, MacNider came to the new colony around 1760, extending the reach of his business to Quebec City. The MacNiders quickly became one of the leading mercantile families there, selling Canadian timber and supplies to the Royal Navy and trading in wine and spices from Europe and the British West Indies to Quebec, London and Scotland.

At Quebec City, MacNider was made a Justice of the Peace. In 1788, he purchased the seigneuries of Grondines and Bélair. He was elected to represent Hampshire County in the 1st Parliament of Lower Canada from 1792 to 1796. He was supported in his election bid of 1792 by his nephews (the brothers), John and Mathew MacNider (1762–1820), of Glendrishock, Ayrshire. They helped to garner support for him in the Upper Town of Quebec. In 1801, MacNider purchased the Barony of Portneuf County, Quebec and the Seigneury of Sainte-Croix on a fifty-year lease from the Ursulines of Quebec. He built several stone mills and a manor house by the Portneuf River. He was married firstly in Scotland and then to a Genevieve Dauphin before 1768 at Quebec.
