= George Wetherall =

British Army general (1788–1868)

General Sir George Wetherall GCB KH
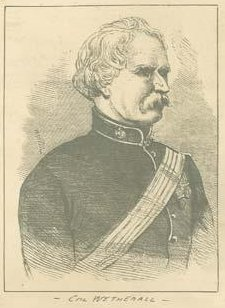
- Born: 1788; Penton, Hampshire
- Died: 8 April 1868 (aged 79–80); Sandhurst, Berkshire
- Relatives: father Frederick Augustus Wetherall, mother Elizabeth Mytton
- Military career
- Allegiance: United Kingdom
- Branch: British Army
- Rank: General
- Commands: Northern District
- Conflicts: War of the Third Coalition: Capture of Cape Colony; Napoleonic Wars: Invasion of Java; Lower Canada Rebellion: Battle of Saint-Charles
- Awards: Knight Grand Cross of the Order of the Bath; Knight of the Royal Guelphic Order

General Sir George Augustus Wetherall, GCB, KH (1788 – 8 April 1868) was a senior British Army officer.

== Military career ==
As the son of General Sir Frederick Wetherall, George Augustus Wetherall was educated in the senior department of the Royal Military College, and entered the army in 1803. He served as brigade-major at the Cape of Good Hope in 1807, took part in the conquest of Java as aide-de-camp to his father, from 1822 till 1825 was military secretary to the commander-in-chief of Madras, and in 1826 was appointed deputy judge-advocate-general in India.

General Wetherall is most famous for his services during the rebellion in Canada of 1837/38 during which he was the Commander of the Royals' 2nd battalion in the Battle of Saint-Charles, a battle part of the Lower Canada Rebellion fought on 25 November 1837 between Great Britain and Lower Canada Patriote rebels. After the victory, he and his troops unearthed the Colonne de la liberté, a column erected in Saint-Charles by the Patriotes for the Assembly of the Six Counties, and brought it back as a war trophy to Montreal, along with a number of prisoners.

For his services, Wetherall was made a Companion of the Order of the Bath. He was deputy adjutant-general in Canada from 1843 to 1850. In 1854 he was made Adjutant-General to the Forces, which post he held until 1860 when he took command of the Northern District of England. At the expiration of his services in 1865 he was appointed Governor of the Royal Military College, Sandhurst. He became colonel of the 84th regiment in 1854, was knighted in 1856, made a lieutenant general in 1857, and appointed a Knight Grand Cross of the Order of the Bath in 1865.

In 1860 he was in overall charge of the Royal Volunteer Review in Holyrood Park in Edinburgh for Queen Victoria. The 21,000 men on parade stood before a grandstamd holding 3000 spectators plus upward of 200,000 spectators on the northern slope of Arthur's Seat.

== Legacy ==
The Memorials to Governors in the Chapel of the Royal Military Academy, Sandhurst includes: In Memory of General Sir George Augustus Wetherall, G.C.B., K.H., Colonel of the 84th Foot. Died 8th April, 1868, aged 80 years. He was Governor of this College from 1866 to 1868.

Military offices
Preceded by Sir George Cathcart	Adjutant General; 1854–1860	Succeeded by Sir James Yorke Scarlett
Preceded by Sir John Pennefather	GOC Northern District; 1860–1865	Succeeded by Sir Sydney Cotton
Preceded by Sir Harry Jones	Governor of the Royal Military College, Sandhurst; 1866–1868	Succeeded by Sir Duncan Cameron
Preceded by Sir Loftus William Otway	84th (York and Lancaster) Regiment of Foot; 1854–1868	Succeeded by Thomas Wood
