= John MacNider =

Scottish-Canadian businessman (1760–1829)

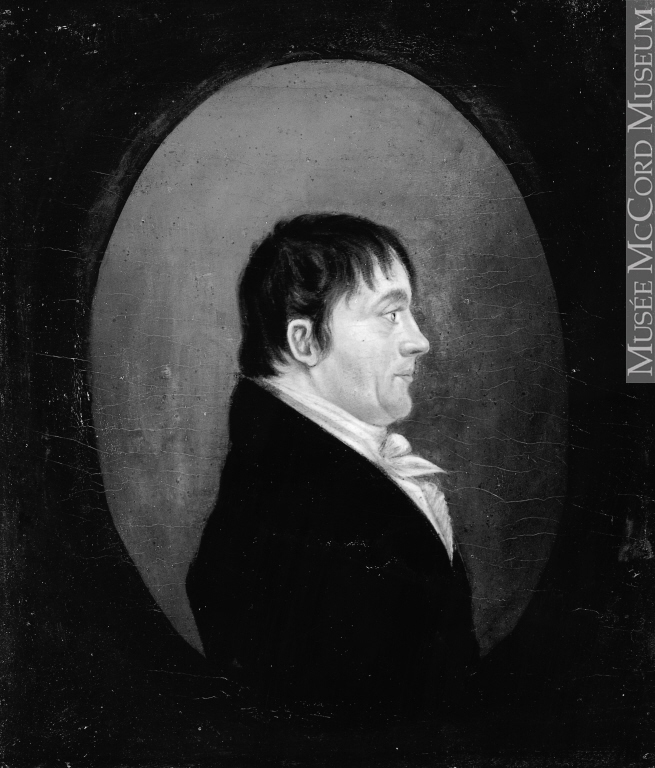
- Born: 10 June 1760; Kilmarnock, Ayrshire, Scotland
- Died: 1829 (aged 68–69); Kilmarnock Manor, near Quebec City

John MacNider (10 June 1760 – 1829) was a Scottish-Quebecer businessman who pioneered the settlement and development of the Seigneuries of Grand-Métis and Métis-sur-Mer, Quebec. He is remembered as a particularly enterprising and visionary Seigneur, "a man with the dreams and ambition to pursue its (Metis's) development and with the means to do so". From nothing, he developed a thriving Scottish community into which he willingly put more money in than he ever took out. Though MacNider died three years before its completion, he played a crucial role in persuading Governor Sir James Kempt to build the road that would connect Métis by land to the outside world. The road became a settlement magnet, and Métis quickly became the principal population centre for the Gaspé region. His second wife, Mrs Angelica (Stuart) MacNider (1764–1829), kept a diary recording early life at Métis, held at the National Archives of Canada. He was the grandfather of The Hon. Félix-Gabriel Marchand, 11th Prime Minister of Quebec.

== Early life ==
Born in 1760, at Kilmarnock, Ayrshire. He was the third son of William MacNider (1725–1800), of Kilmarnock, and his wife Ann Vallance (died 1801), daughter of William Vallance of Paisley. His father owned a share of the MacNider lands at Thrave and Kirkoswald, but he was principally a merchant. William MacNider represented the family's shipping and trading business in Britain, which he ran in partnership with his younger brother, The Hon. Mathew MacNider, Seigneur of Bélair, Grondines, Sainte-Croix etc., all in Quebec. John's uncle, Mathew, represented Hampshire County in the 1st Parliament of Lower Canada, from 1792 to 1796. John's sister, Margaret MacNider (1764–1838), was married first to Lt.-Colonel James Johnston, and secondly to William Holmes, Surgeon-General to the British Forces in the Canadas.

== Business career ==
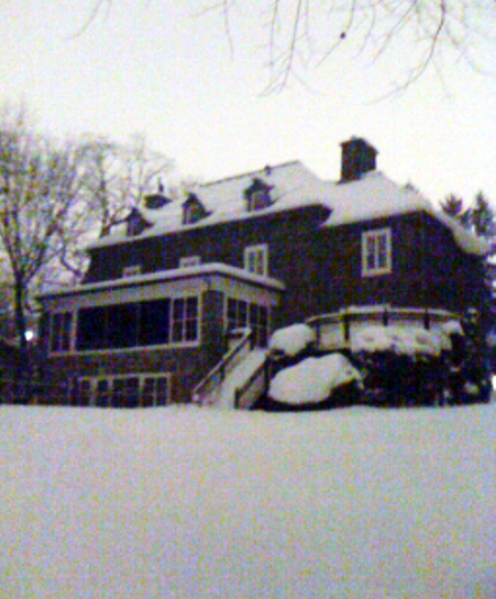
Kilmarnock Manor, Sillery, Quebec City. Built in 1802, this was John MacNider's principal family home

As a young man, John came to Quebec and after working under his uncle he later took over as the head of the family business, in partnership with his younger brother, Mathew (1762–1820), of Glendishrock, Ayrshire. The MacNiders ran a large import and export business with five stone-built warehouses on Rue de la Fabrique in Quebec City. Their firm sold Canadian timber and supplies to the Royal Navy and traded in wine and spices from Europe and the British West Indies to sell both at Quebec and Britain. John kept shipyards (where he built his ships and sent his timber cargoes to Britain) outside Sillery. Near there, off the Chemin de St. Louis, John built a country estate in 1802, naming his new home Kilmarnock Manor, which apart from a few obvious extensions still stands today.

Aside from his mercantile activities, John co-founded and served as either President or vice-President of the Quebec Savings Bank. There is a legend to the effect that long after his death, John's hat continued to be placed on the table at director's meetings. John retired from business life in 1816, making his stepson, Charles William Ross, and the husband of his step-daughter, John Graddon, the new senior partners of his trading firm.

== Purchasing the Seigneury of Métis ==
In 1807, John purchased at a Sheriff's auction the Fief and Seigneury of Métis (which then comprised both Grand-Métis and Métis-sur-Mer), formerly the property of Mathew MacNider. This Mathew was thought to be his first cousin, but there is still much confusion over which of the three Mathew MacNiders this was - all three being alive at the time.

If it was John's first cousin who became the first British Seigneur of Métis, then the Mathew in question was Mathew MacNider (1770–1810), of Quebec City. In 1802, he paid £1,800 for the Seigneury of Metis, which measured thirty six square miles and included a very considerable water front. In 2007, Gilbert Bosse gave a talk on the history of Metis and he is quoted as saying,

Between unsound business dealings gone sour, and unanticipated attacks by con artists, Mathew MacNider found all his lands seized by a Sheriff's writ of execution, in mid-May, 1805. Surprisingly, this practice was quite prevalent during the Seigneurial era (1627-1854), not only in large urban areas. From my copy of the MacNider Collection, we learn in Volume III, Mathew MacNider, at that time, owned not only the Métis Seigneury, but several hundred pieces of land, seigneuries, mills and other estates, that were all seized.

John MacNider of Kilmarnock Manor picked up the Seigneury of Métis plus a further three islands at the Sheriff's auction in 1807 for a steal: £105. Soon afterwards he made the customary seigneurial acte de foi et homage in the French Canadian tradition.

== Settling Métis ==
From 1818, John MacNider started to develop the seigneury by settling families from the North of Scotland and those of soldiers from Highland regiments disbanded after the War of 1812. Taking into consideration the severities of winter and the inevitable struggles and misfortunes incident to a new and untried life, on their arrival MacNider gave the settlers rent-free accommodation and provided them with food, clothing and farm implements for their first two years. Once they had become self-sufficient at the end of that period, they then paid 12 shillings, 5 pence rent for each farm of 140 to 200 acres. But, with true Scottish grit and old world gratitude, many of the settlers refused all aid after the first year.

== Early development of Métis ==
The focal point of the new settlement was MacNider's manor house at Little Métis Point, from where he could run his many business interests when there in the summer months. But, his and his second wife's, Angelica's, real home there was a modest cottage at Grand-Métis, which to Angelica seemed 'the pleasantest situation in the world'. Angelica's opinion of Little Metis was much the same, as recorded on her first viewing of the community in her diary for 22 June 1822:

In the course of the day a great many of our tenants came to pay their respects to us; Little Métis is one of the prettiest places that I ever saw; it is like an island. The manor house is built on the Point and all the buildings which are built around it makes it appear as a little villa surrounded with water. They have no garden which is a great shame as the soil seems very rich. Mr MacNider had caught that morning a trout weighing 8 pounds which we took down for dinner. We came home to our cottage at Grand Métis at Seven O'Clock in our own calash on very indifferent roads, took another very large fish weighing 6 pounds, took our supper, went to bed as happy as can be in this world of troubles

Always at his own expense, MacNider continued to develop the seigneury to provide employment for the settlers, which by 1822 was home to over one hundred people. He built fishing stages at L'Anse-aux-Morts; a shipyard at Little Metis and several lighthouses for the benefit of the ships entering the mouth of the St. Lawrence River. MacNider's own ships linked the Métis Seigneury with Quebec City and other important docks along the river. MacNider also built a private schooner to provide himself with a regular shipping service to Quebec and his home, Kilmarnock Manor.

All the construction underway at the time meant Mrs Angelica MacNider was "being very well entertained to see so many men at work... (there were) millwrights, carpenters, masons, carters for the stones etc., (and she found them) very happy to see their Seigneuresse". She remarked their cottages were "very comfortable and clean" and they were in good health, optimistically adding there being "no need of doctors at Métis".

== Roads and timber trade at Métis ==
On assessing the Seigneury in 1828, Lord Dalhousie recognised that the "soil appears excellent (and therefore) tempting to settlers," but he commented that its distance from the markets at Quebec City and its poor roads were limiting its economic development. In immediate response, the resourceful John MacNider became a pioneer road-builder of the lower St. Lawrence region and persuaded the Governor-General, Sir James Kempt, to undertake the building of the Kempt Road that would eventually link the St. Lawrence with the Chaleur Bay via the Matapédia Valley and Matapedia Lake route.

In Dalhousie's report of 1828, he also noted the "very superior timber" of Metis, which would become the seigneury's prime asset. Having abundant quantities of hardwood and extensive pine forests, it attracted the attention of the Quebec timber baron, William Price, who joined forces with his friend MacNider in exploiting the region's rich forest resources. Price established large sawmills in place of MacNider's smaller ones, and timber exports soared. By 1833, Price and MacNider were moving 100 shiploads of lumber a year to Quebec City and overseas markets. This forest industry provided year-long employment for the pioneer settlers of Metis.

By 1832, Joseph Bouchette, the Surveyor Generalof Lower Canada, found Metis to have all the trappings of a well-settled community: The river frontage was fully cleared and there were "some tolerably good farms, mills and stores (together with) dwelling houses intended for the reception of travellers". The settlers were concentrated at Grand-Métis (where a mile below the seigneurial mills had been constructed), which was about five miles to the west of Petit Métis and linked by a 'passable' beach road.

== Religion in early Métis ==
The one part of early community life neglected by MacNider was the building of a church and the appointment of a priest, neither of which happened until a long time after MacNider's death, when a Presbyterian Church was erected in 1847. This points to an indifference on MacNider's part towards religion. Starved of spiritual guidance, the early settlers welcomed with open arms any opportunity for worship, no matter from which denomination of faith it came. Mrs MacNider was Catholic, and even though the villagers were almost entirely Presbyterian they joined with her in the excitement caused by the visit of a Roman Catholic Bishop in 1822,

His Eminence made his appearance in his barge, accompanied by four priests; they fired guns and we answered from our fort; as the tide was low we sent a carriage for his Lordship, who arrived in safety. Never was there such a sight at Metis before; all the ladies of the neighbourhood in their best attire, came to pay their homage, and ask the Bishop's benediction...

In 1824, when George Mountain, the Anglican Bishop of Quebec, came to Metis, he too could not have been "more thankfully received... the public prayers, the psalm singing, the preaching of the word had all the zest for these people of a rare and unexpected occurrence".

== Subsequent MacNiders at Métis ==
John MacNider died at Kilmarnock Manor in 1829. He willed the Seigneury of Metis to the two eldest sons (William and John MacNider) of his nephew, Adam Lymburner MacNider (1788–1840) J.P., of Montreal, Quebec. As his heirs were still minors, their father administered to the needs of the seigneury, helped by his first cousin, Hugh Archibald MacNider (1797–1893), who John had appointed as the on-site year-round manager of the Seigneury. Adam's family spent a considerable amount of time at Metis during the summer months and he extended his uncle's road-building program. As more settlers were attracted to the area, Adam requested the government to survey the neighbouring township, which was duly opened and named MacNider after the family. Adam died at the Metis manor house in 1840.

At some point, the Seigneury was divided into two equal parts, which came to be known as Grand-Métis and Métis-sur-Mer or Little Métis; John MacNider (born 1822) taking the former and William MacNider (1818–1846) the latter. In 1851, John MacNider ran into financial difficulties and sold Grand-Métis to the merchant brothers Archibald and David Ferguson of Montreal; personal friends of the MacNiders. In 1855, William MacNider's widow, Mrs Philadelphia (Wishart) MacNider (1814–1890), who had returned to her native Edinburgh, sold Little Métis to the same Ferguson brothers.

David Ferguson later bought out his brother and rebuilt the manor house in 1854. In 1886, David's son and heir, David H. Ferguson, sold the Domain (the old Seigneurial system of New France was formally ended in 1854) to Lord Mount Stephen. He in turn left the domain to his niece, Mrs Elsie Reford, the pioneer horticulturalist who built Estevan Lodge and created Les Jardins de Metis.
