= John Wells (architect) =

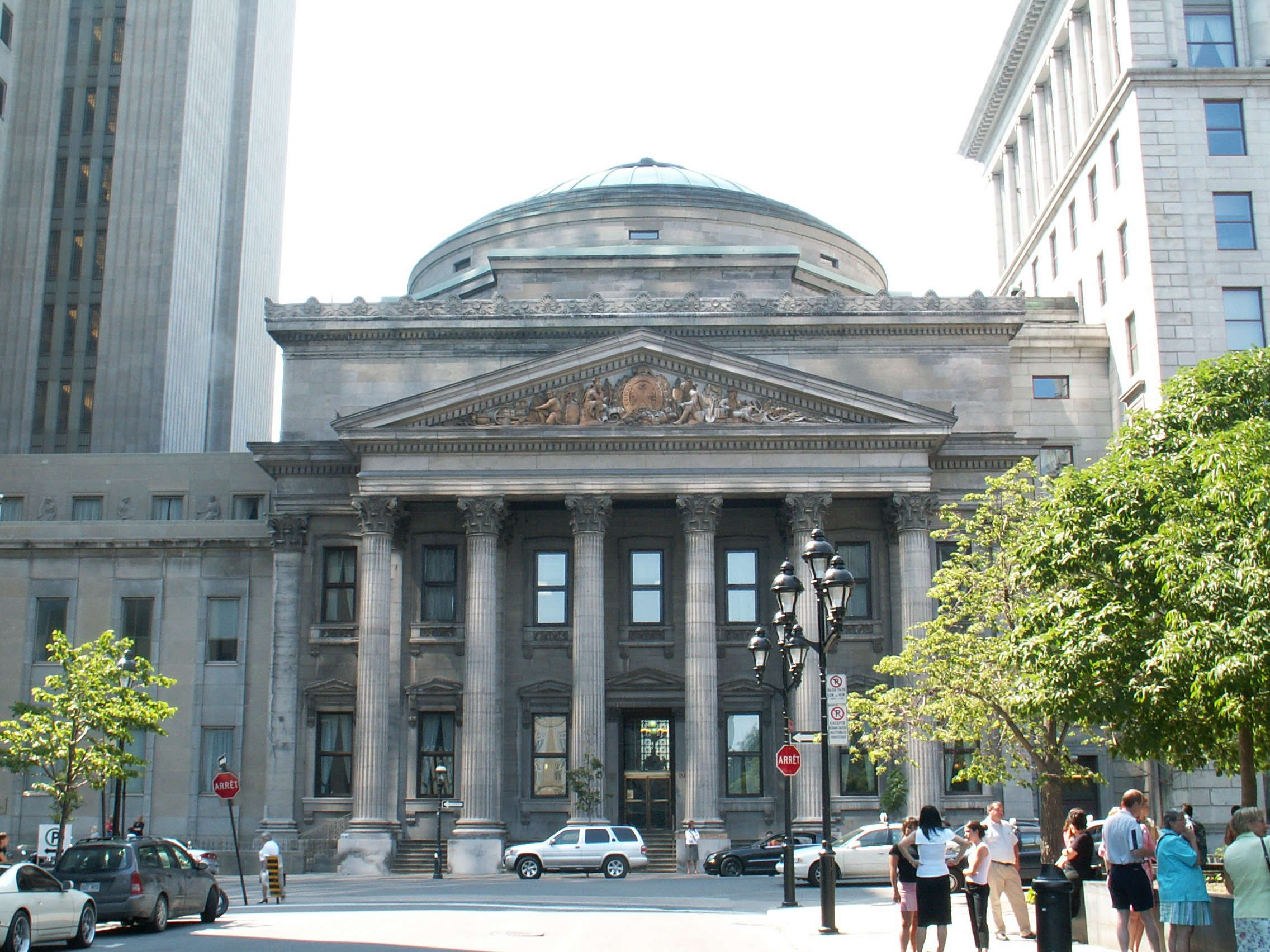
Head Office of the Bank of Montreal in Old Montreal, designed and completed by Wells in 1847

John Wells (1789–1864), was an English-born architect who had his works displayed at the Royal Academy in the 1820s. He is best known for his work in Montreal, Quebec, most notably the Bank of Montreal Head Office and St. Anne's Market, that afterwards housed the Parliament Buildings at Montreal.

Wells was born at Norwich, where he trained as a carpenter. He worked on the facade of St Mary Moorfields in London, after which he became an architect, displaying his works at the Royal Academy in 1823 and 1828. Exploiting the rapid growth and population boom, he came to Montreal in about 1830. His first commission was to erect the new prison, and afterwards he constructed the Ste. Ann's Market (1832), that stood until the Burning of the Parliament Buildings in Montreal. In 1834, he was commissioned by John Redpath and Peter McGill to design and build a new home for St. Paul's Presbyterian Church. He completed several religious buildings for all denominations, including Chalmers-Wesley United Church, and his personal popularity won him private commissions for some of Montreal's leading figures within the Golden Square Mile - such as the Notman House (1845) and Prince of Wales Terrace, completed in 1860 for Sir George Simpson. His biography in The Canadian Encyclopedia, states that "due to the disappearance of a majority of his works, he has been overlooked as the arbiter of architectural taste in early Victorian Montreal". He died at Montreal April 26, 1864, and was survived by at least one son (G.H. Wells) and one daughter (Mrs Deborah Wadsworth).
