= Robert James Graves =

Anglo-Irish surgeon (1796–1853)

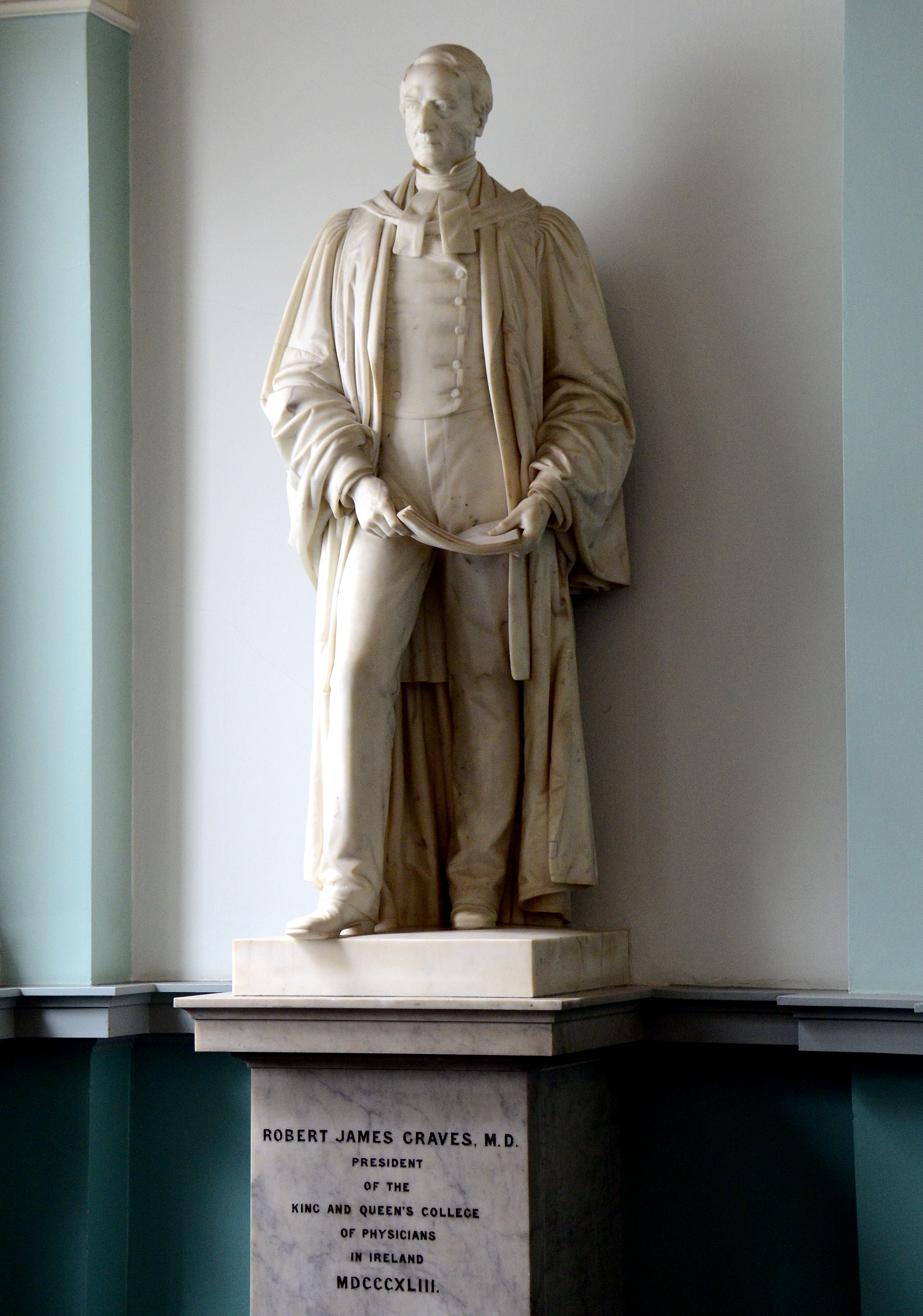

President of the Royal College of Physicians of Ireland
- In office 1843–1849
- Preceded by: Sir Henry Marsh, 1st Baronet
- Succeeded by: William Stokes

Personal details
- Born: 27 March 1796 Holles Street, Dublin
- Died: 20 March 1853 (aged 56) Cloghan Castle, County Offaly
- Resting place: Mount Jerome Cemetery, Dublin
- Education: Trinity College Dublin

Robert James Graves FRCS (27 March 1796 – 20 March 1853) was an Anglo-Irish surgeon after whom Graves' disease takes its name. He was President of the Royal College of Physicians of Ireland, Fellow of the Royal Society of London and the co-founder of the Dublin Journal of Medical Science. He is also claimed to be the uncredited inventor of the second-hand on watches.

== Early life ==
The eighth child of the Dean of Ardagh, Richard Graves, and Elizabeth Mary Drought (1767–1827), daughter of Rev. James Drought (1738–1820) D.D., of Dublin and Park, "a member of one of the principal families of the King's County (Offaly)," whose mother was the sister of Theaker Wilder. Wilder, Robert's father and maternal grandfather were all Senior Fellows of Trinity College Dublin, where in 1811 he was entered under his elder brother-in-law, Thomas Meredith, after receiving his early schooling in Downpatrick and Dublin.

After an undergraduate career in the arts, he received a degree in medicine in 1818 and left for London to study surgery under Sir William Blizard. Afterwards, he spent the following three years travelling the continent between stints as an observer at the medical schools of Edinburgh, Berlin, Vienna, Göttingen, Hamburg, Copenhagen and those of France and Italy.

Graves had an exceptional talent for languages, and while in continental Europe he was imprisoned for ten days in Austria when travelling on foot without a passport; the authorities thought him to be a German spy, none of them believing that an Irishman could speak their language so well. Continuing his travels, in the Swiss Alps Graves became acquainted with the painter Joseph Mallord William Turner. They travelled and sketched together for several months, eventually parting company in Rome. On his way from Genoa to Sicily, Graves saved a ship and its mutinous crew by assuming command during a storm in the Mediterranean. During a gale the vessel sprang a leak, the pumps failed, and the crew attempted to abandon ship: Graves holed the one lifeboat with an axe, declaring to the crew, "let us all be drowned together, it is a pity to part good company", he then proceeded to repair the pumps with leather from his own shoes, so saving the ship and all aboard.

== Medical career ==
Graves returned to Dublin in 1821, setting up his own medical practice and introducing new clinical methods that he had witnessed on his travels to the Meath Hospital and the Park Street School of Medicine which he helped found. This included, among other things, bedsides teaching, of which William Hale-White said "this is real clinical teaching", and went on in his book, Great Doctors of the Nineteenth Century, to say that Graves held the honour of introducing this system to Ireland:

(Graves) insists that... mere walking the hospital must go. The Edinburgh system, in which the teacher interrogates the patient in a loud voice, the clerk repeats the patients' answer in a similar voice, the crowd of students round the bed, most of whom cannot see the patient, hears all this and makes notes, is of no use. Students must examine patients for themselves under the guidance of their teachers, they must make suggestions as to diagnosis, morbid anatomy and treatment to their teacher who will discuss the cases with them.

In this technique one of his students, William Stokes (1804–1878), soon became his collaborator. Together they made the Dublin School of Medicine famous throughout the world.

Graves was possessed of the qualities that would ensure a great teacher. He was tall, somewhat swarthy with a vivacious manner, and like other avant-garde professors of his time, he gave his lectures in English rather than in Latin, or Dog Latin as was still the case in most classes in the 1830s. In his introductory lecture he said: "From the very commencement the student should set out to witness the progress and effects of sickness and ought to persevere in the daily observation of disease during the whole period of his studies".

He was appointed Professor to the Institutes of medicine in the Irish College of Physicians and wrote essays and gave lectures on physiological topics. His "Clinical Lectures" were published in 1843 (and again in 1848), giving fame to his name throughout Europe. He was president of the Royal College of Physicians of Ireland in 1843 and 1844 and was elected a fellow of the Royal Society of London in 1849. He received honorary membership of the medical societies in Berlin, Vienna, Hamburg, Tübingen, Bruges and Montreal.

Among the innovations introduced in the lectures were the timing of the pulse by watch and the practicing of giving food and liquids to patients with fever instead of withholding nourishment. It was on a ward round that Graves light-heartedly suggested to William Stokes, 'Lest when I am gone you may be at a loss for an epitaph for me, let me give you one – He Fed Fevers.'

As well as the practical importance of bedside learning to ensure that a graduate was not "a practitioner who has never practised" he emphasised the importance of research, "learn the duty as well as taste the pleasure of original work". He corresponded with old pupils all over the world and continued as an inspired teacher until his death in 1853.

Graves was sometimes sarcastic. In dealing with a colleague's attack on the use of the stethoscope (the instrument was advocated by himself and Stokes having been invented in France in 1816), he wrote: "We suspect Dr Clutterbuck's sense of hearing must be injured: for him the 'ear trumpet' magnifies but distorts sound, rendering it less distinct than before". Dr. Clutterbuck was Henry Clutterbuck, 1770–1856.

In recognition of his achievements in education, Graves was named Regius professor of the Institute of Medicine in Trinity College. With William Stokes he edited the Dublin Journal of Medical and Chemical Science from 1832 to 1842, a journal he had founded with Sir Robert Kane (1809–1890). His lasting fame rests chiefly on his Clinical Lectures, which were a model for the day and recommended by none other than Armand Trousseau (1801–1867), who suggested the term Graves' disease.

== Family ==
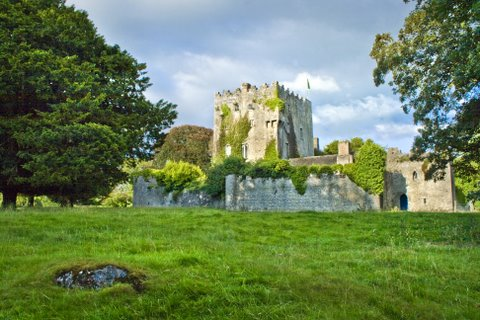
Cloghan Castle, the home of the Graves family from 1852 until 1908.

In 1821 he married his first wife (and first cousin), Matilda Jane Eustace (1806–1825), daughter of Richard and Catherine (Drought) Eustace of Valetta, Kingstown. She died after giving birth to a daughter, who died young. In 1826 he married his second wife (the sister of one of his brothers-in-law), Sarah Jane Brinkley (1801–1827), daughter of Bishop John Brinkley, but she died with her daughter giving birth. In 1830 he married his third wife (another relation of Graves' through the Dawsons of Dartrey), Anna (died 1873), the eldest daughter of Rev. William Grogan of Slaney Park and Anne Saunders. By his third wife he was the father of six children, one of whom married Edward Blackburne of Rathfarnham Castle, the eldest son of Francis Blackburne, Lord Chancellor of Ireland. His granddaughter, Georgina (Graves) Synge, was married to a first cousin of the playwright John Millington Synge. Cloghan Castle was left to his eldest son, Lt.-Colonel William Grogan Graves, High Sheriff of King's County.

== Death ==
Graves kept a townhouse on Merrion Square but died of liver disease at his country residence, 20 March 1853, at age 56. The year before he died his wife persuaded him to buy Cloghan Castle, County Offaly, which was near to his cousins, the Droughts, at Banagher. It was eventually sold by his grandson in 1908. He was buried in Mount Jerome Cemetery, Dublin. His library, worth £30,000 (equivalent to £3,295,562 in 2025), was left to Trinity College Dublin. Following his death, a Dublin watchmaking company began selling watches with second hands, a concept Graves had come up with for personal use but didn't patent. A collection of various of his papers, including a biography, was published by his friend and contemporary William Stokes as Studies in Physiology and Medicine, London, 1863.

== Bibliography ==
- Clinical reports, of the medical cases in the Meath Hospital and County of Dublin Infirmary, during the session 1826, 1827 (1827)
- A lecture on the functions of the lymphatic system (1834)
- Clinical lectures delivered during the sessions of 1834-5 and 1836-7 (1838)
- Clinical lectures (1842)
- A system of clinical medicine (1843)
- Clinical lectures on the practice of medicine (1848)
- Studies in physiology and medicine (1863), edited by William Stokes

== Sources ==
- Biography of Robert James Graves
- Clinical Reports of the Medical Cases in the Meath Hospital and County of Dublin Infirmary During the Session 1826, 27, P. 1.

With William Stokes. Dublin, 1827,

- Lectures on the Functions of the Lymphatic System.

Dublin, 1828.

- Clinical lectures.

First published 1835 in the London Medical and Surgical Journal and London Medical Gazette. The series for two sessions were first collected and published together in Philadelphia, 1838, as: Clinical lectures delivered during the sessions of 1834–5 and 1836–7.

- Newly observed affection of the thyroid gland in females. (Clinical lectures.)

London Medical and Surgical Journal, 1835; VII: 516–517.

- A System of Clinical Medicine.

Dublin, Fannin & Co., 1843. 3rd American edition with notes etc. by William Gerhard (1809–1872), Philadelphia, 1848. German translation by Heiman Bressler (1805–1873): Klinische Erfahrungen aus dem Englischen von Robert Graves übersetzt. Leipzig, 1843.

- Clinical Lectures on the Practice of Medicine.

2nd edition of A System of Clinical Medicine, edited by John Moore Neligan (1815–1863). 2 volumes, Dublin 1848; French translation by Sigismond Jaccoud, Paris, 1862. Much new material was added to this edition, especially Graves' observation on the epidemiology of cholera. He was one of the first to clearly show that cholera was contagious and spread along the lines of human contact.

- Graves published John Noble Johnson's :

The life of Thomas Linacre etc. London, 1835.

=== Obituaries ===
- Medical Times and Gazette, London, 1853, VI, page 351.
- William Stokes in Medical Times and Gazette, London, 1854, VIII, page 1.
- J. F. Duncan in Dublin Quarterly Journal of Medical Science, 1878, LXV: 1.
