= Métis-sur-Mer =

- City
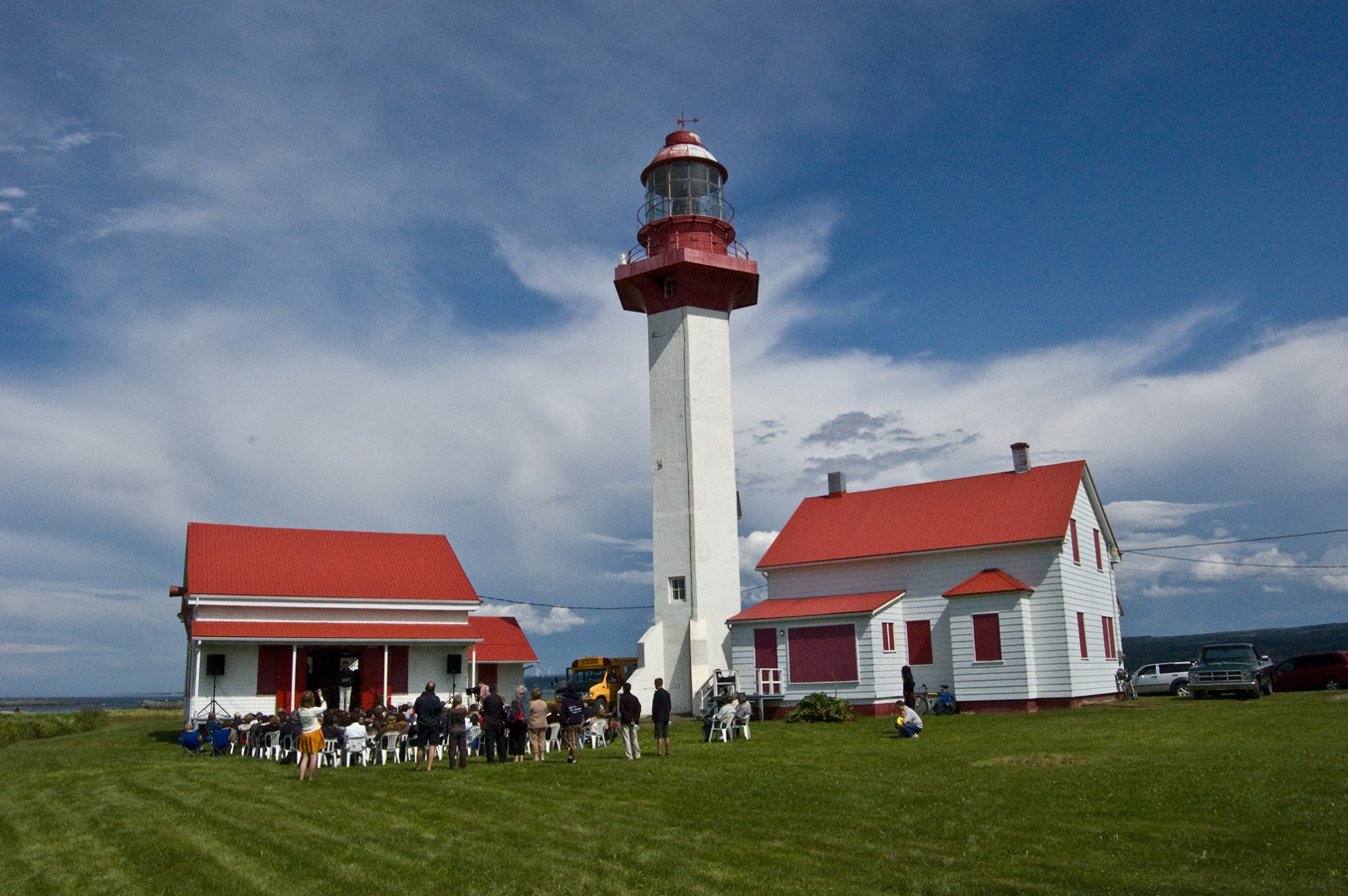

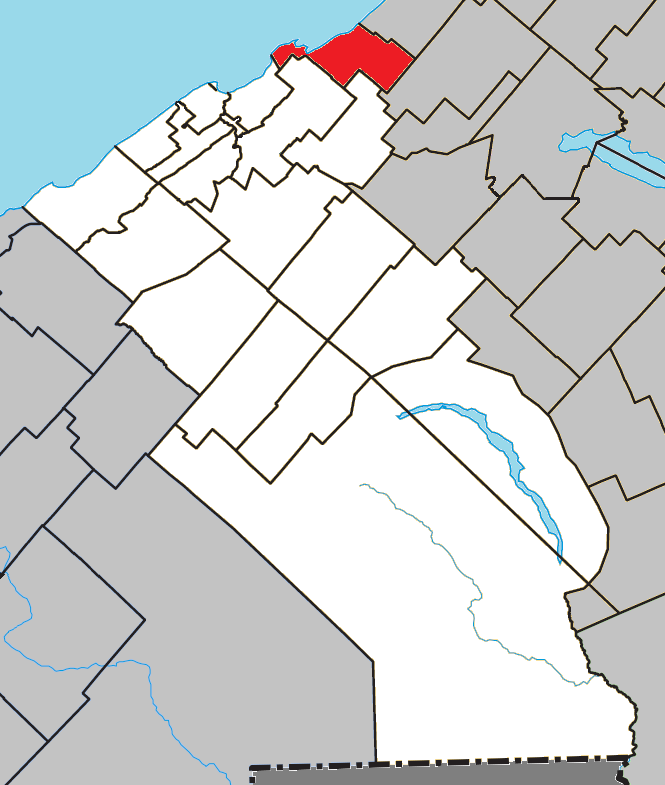
- Location within La Mitis RCM

- Location in eastern Quebec
- Coordinates: 48.67°N 68°W
- Country: Canada
- Province: Quebec
- Region: Bas-Saint-Laurent
- RCM: La Mitis
- Constituted: July 4, 2002
- Boroughs: MacNider

Government
  - Mayor: Pascale Geoffroy
  - Federal riding: Rimouski-Neigette—Mitis—Matapédia—Les Basques
  - Prov. riding: Matane-Matapédia-Mitis

Area
  - Total: 263.70 km^{2} (101.82 sq mi)
  - Land: 48.22 km^{2} (18.62 sq mi)

Population (2021)
  - Total: 594
  - Density: 12.3/km^{2} (32/sq mi)
  - Pop 2016–2021: ▲3.8%
  - Dwellings: 505
- Time zone: UTC−5 (EST)
  - Summer (DST): UTC−4 (EDT)
- Postal code(s): G0J 1S0
- Area codes: 418 and 581
- Highways: R-132
- Website: www.ville.metis-sur-mer.qc.ca

Métis-sur-Mer (French pronunciation: [metis syʁ mɛʁ], lit. 'Métis on Sea') is a city in the La Mitis Regional County Municipality within the Bas-Saint-Laurent region of Quebec, Canada. It had a population of 594 in the Canada 2021 Census.

The name "Métis" is said to come from a Mi'kmaq word meaning "meeting place"; "sur-mer" refers to its location on the Saint Lawrence River.

== History ==
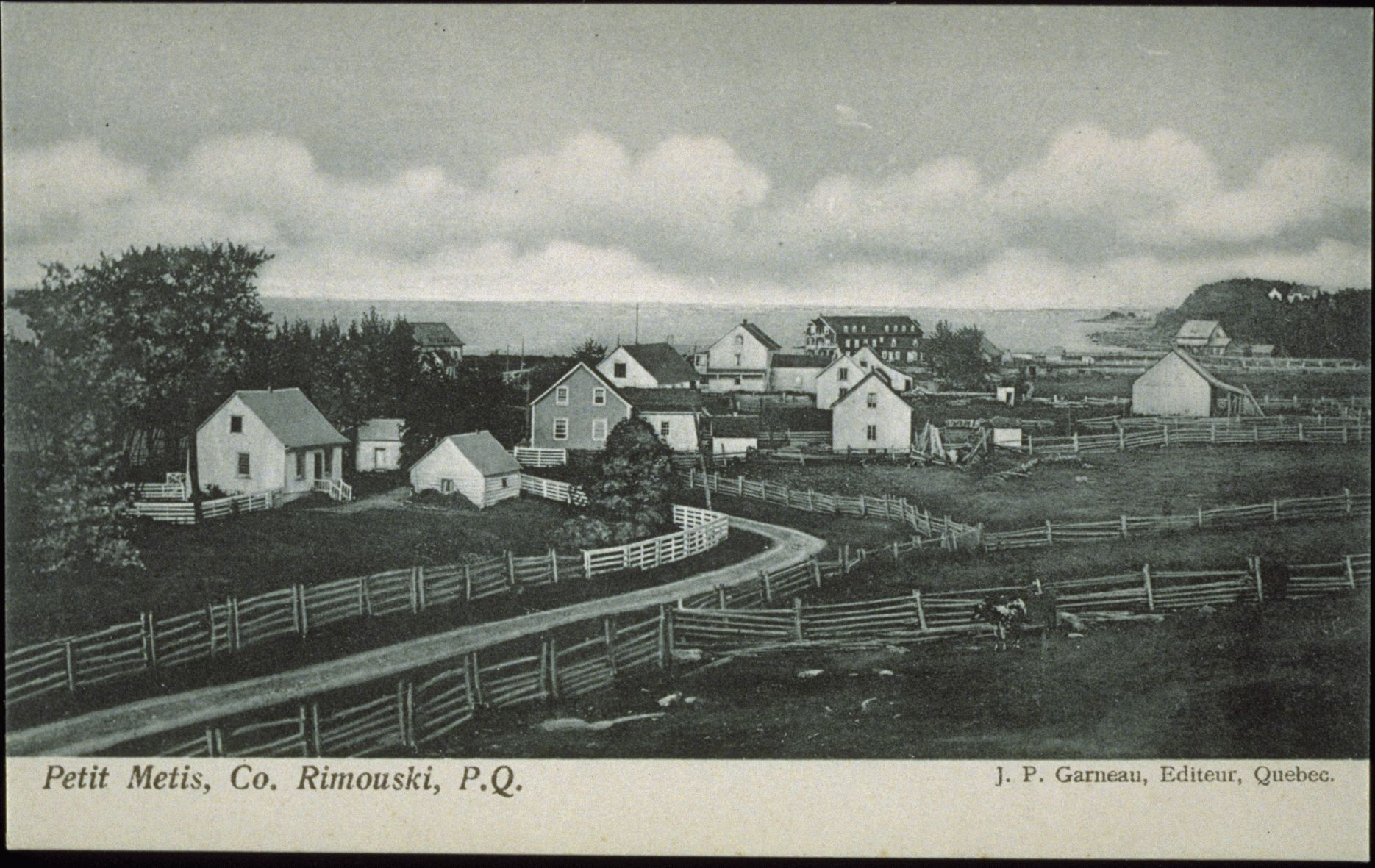
Métis-sur-Mer, postcard, c. 1904 – 1910

From 1818, John MacNider, the Scottish Seigneur of Métis started settling the area with Scottish immigrants.

The city has a borough named MacNider, named after MacNider's family. Its territory corresponds to the former (pre-merger) village municipality of Métis-sur-Mer (Metis Beach).

The town was a popular summer vacation spot for wealthy anglophone Montrealers. At the end of the 19th century, they spent their time in Métis-sur-Mer to flee waves of cholera. At the beginning of the 20th century, they did so again to escape outbreaks of the Spanish flu.

On July 4, 2002, the village of Métis-sur-Mer and the municipality of Les Boules merged to form the city of Métis-sur-Mer.

== Demographics ==
In the 2021 Census of Population conducted by Statistics Canada, Métis-sur-Mer had a population of 594 living in 310 of its 505 total private dwellings, a change of 3.8% from its 2016 population of 572. With a land area of 48.22 km^{2} (18.62 sq mi), it had a population density of 12.3/km^{2} (31.9/sq mi) in 2021.

=== Population ===
Population trend:

Census	Population	Change (%)
2021	594	▲3.8%
2016	572	▼11.1%
2011	644	▲6.6%
2006	604	N/A

== See also ==
- List of anglophone communities in Quebec
- List of cities in Quebec
