= Dorchester Bridge =

Bridge in Quebec City, Quebec, Canada

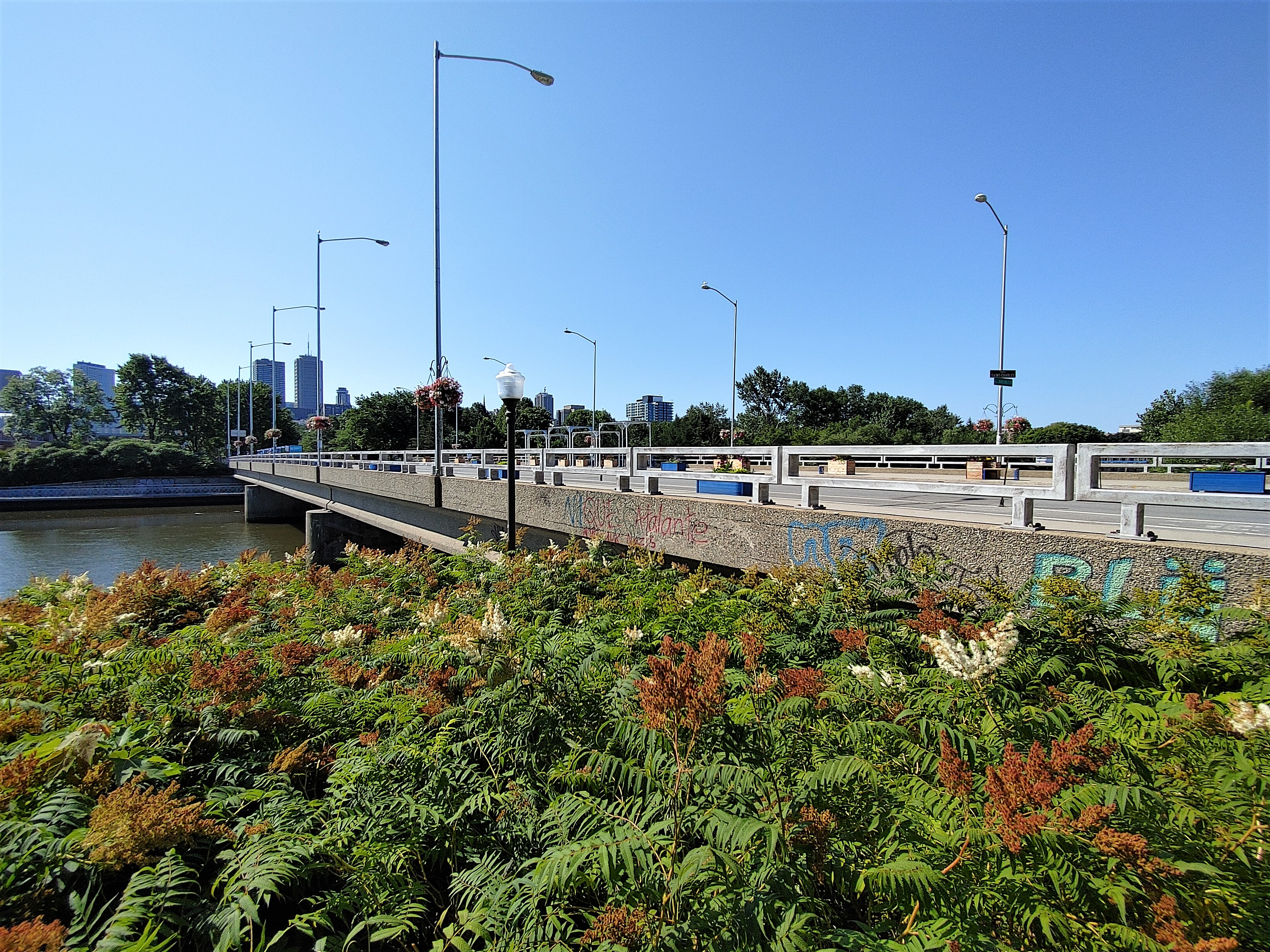
- Dorchester Bridge, 2021
- Coordinates: 46°49′09″N 71°13′25″W
- Crosses: Saint-Charles River
- Locale: Quebec City

History
- Opened: 24 September 1789

Location
- Interactive map of Dorchester Bridge

The Dorchester Bridge (French: Pont Dorchester) is a bridges in Quebec City that crosses the Saint-Charles River near its mouth, connecting the boroughs of La Cité and Limoilou. There have been several iterations of this bridge, the first dating from 1789 and the newest being completed in 1972.

== History ==
The first bridge was built by Asa Porter and opened on 24 September 1789. The bridge was named after Guy Carleton, 1st Baron Dorchester, and was the first permanent bridge in Quebec City. The bridge crossed the Saint-Charles River near its mouth, connecting to Craig Street.

In 1822, the bridge was rebuilt slightly to the west of the original bridge. The new structure was built by Anthony Hedley Anderson and his partner, a Mr. Smith, and was operated as a toll bridge. The long wooden structure included a drawbridge to allow ships to pass.

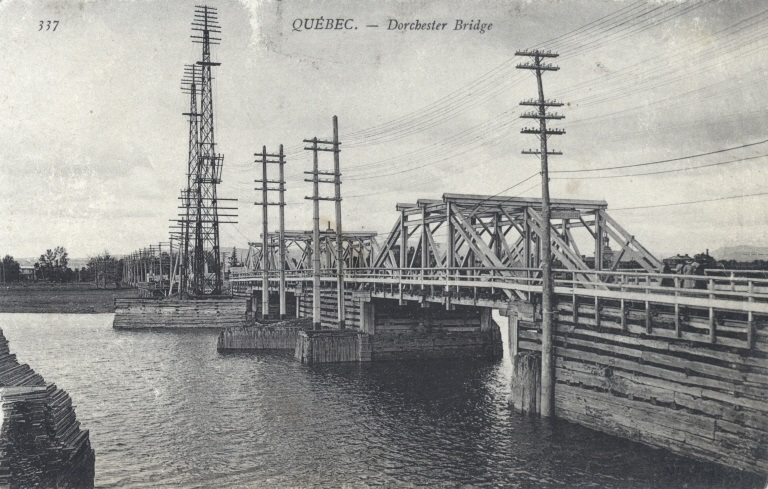
Dorchester Bridge, about 1910

The bridge was acquired in 1850 by the Quebec City Gate Road Commission, a private entity. Incorporated by an act of the Government of the United Provinces of Canada in 1841, this commission was responsible for the maintenance of the main roads around Quebec City. As a toll bridge, small houses were erected on either side to house the gatekeepers and their families. On June 1, 1860, an angry mob, opposed an increase in the pedestrian fare, tore down the barriers and threw them into the river. They were reinstalled despite continued discontent.

On July 4, 1903, outraged by the excessive crossing costs, the Quebec City's newspaper, Le Soleil, exclaimed: "We must put an end, once and for all, to these customs from another age." On January 1, 1911, the City of Quebec purchased the bridge and finally abolished the tolls.

The city began demolition of the bridge in 1913, and completed its replacement with a steel bascule bridge in 1915. This later gave way to the current Dorchester Bridge, a concrete structure, which opened to traffic in 1972. Construction of the Saint-Joseph Street Mall, which cut off access to Charest Boulevard, significantly reduced traffic on the bridge.
