= William Dennis (disambiguation) =

William Dennis (1856–1920) was an Independent Conservative member of the Senate of Canada.

- William Henry Dennis (1887–1954), his nephew and Canadian Conservative senator from 1912 to 1920

William or Billy Dennis may also refer to:

- Billy Dennis (English footballer) (1896–1952), English footballer
- Willie Dennis (1926–1965), American jazz musician
- Willie D (born 1966), rapper
- Bill Dennis (born 1935), NASCAR driver
- William Lockyer Dennis (1853–1919), English-born American politician
- William M. Dennis (1810–1882), American businessman and politician
- William S. Dennis (fl. 1910s), American captain of the Vanitie yacht in the America's Cup trials
- Will Dennis (born 2000), English footballer
