= Martha Allan =

Canadian theatre figure

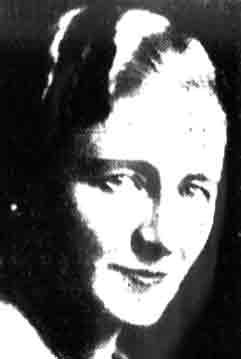
- Born: Marguerite Martha Allan; August 5, 1894; Montreal, Quebec, Canada
- Died: April 4, 1942 (aged 47); Victoria, British Columbia, Canada
- Known for: Pioneer of the modern Canadian theatre scene

Marguerite Martha Allan (August 5, 1894 – April 4, 1942) was the founder of the Montreal Repertory Theatre and co-founder of the Dominion Drama Festival. She loathed amateur theatre, but her energies spearheaded the Canadian Little Theatre Movement at a time when live theatre in Montreal and across Canada was being threatened by the rapid expansion of the American-influenced movie theater. She almost single-handedly laid the groundwork for the development of the professional modern Canadian theatre scene. In 1935, she received the Canadian Drama Award for outstanding service in the development of the Canadian theatre. At the annual Dominion Drama Festival the Martha Allan Trophy is awarded in her memory for the best visual performance. She also wrote three plays: What Fools We Mortals Be; Summer Solstice; and All Of A Summer's Day, that won the Sir Barry Jackson Trophy for the best Canadian play at the Dominion Drama Festival in the early 1930s.

== Biography ==
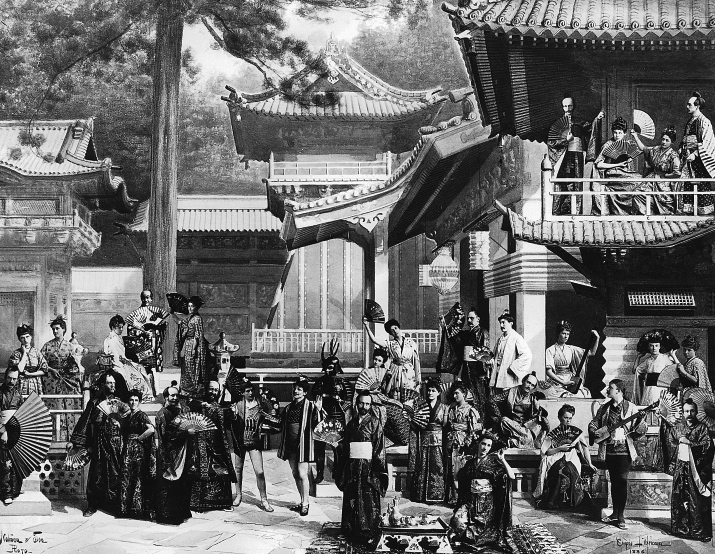
A composite by William Notman of a performance of The Mikado given by the Castanet Club of Montreal in 1886. Martha's father, Sir Montague Allan, can be seen waving a fan in the bottom right-hand corner.

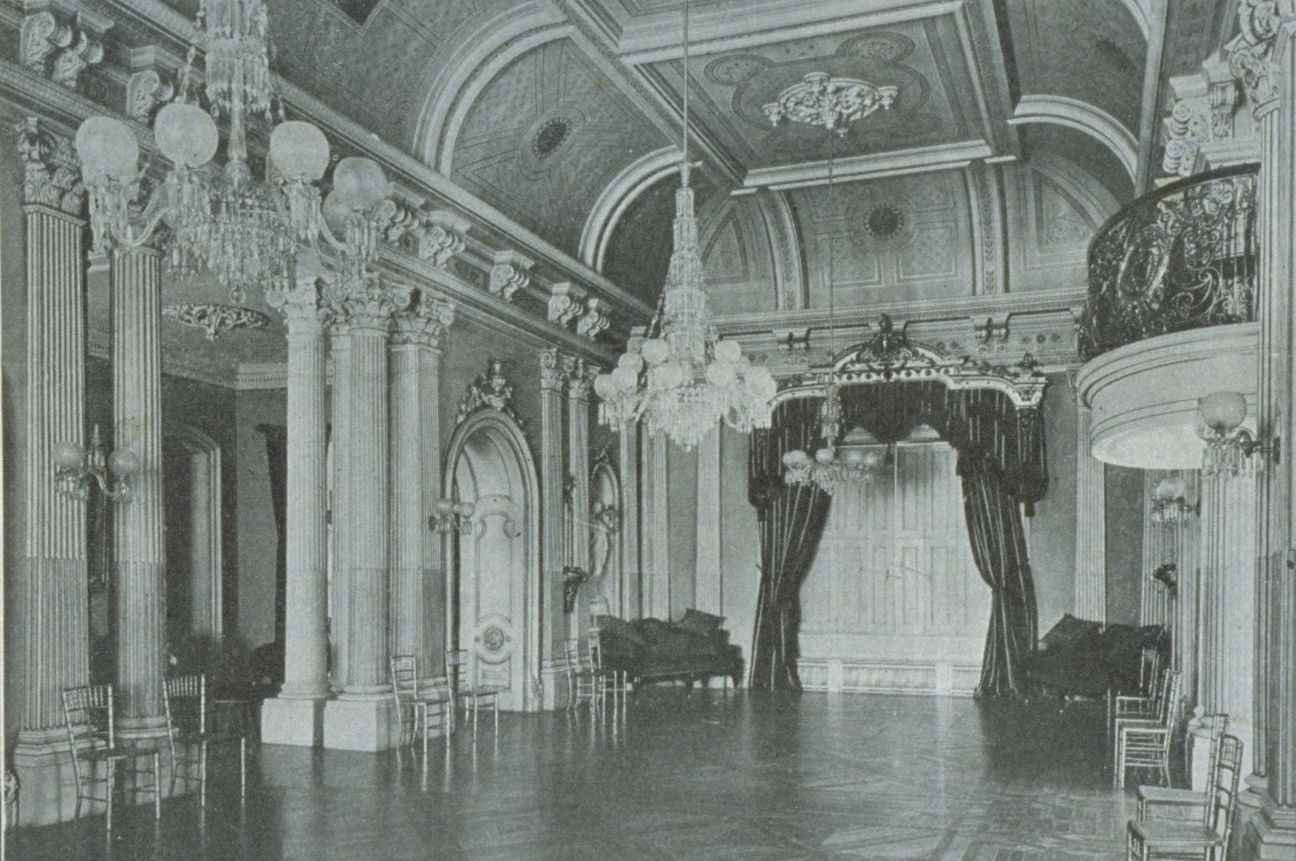
The ballroom at Ravenscrag, where Allan had held private performances when she was younger

Martha Allan was born in Montreal's Golden Square Mile. She was the eldest child of Sir Montague Allan of Ravenscrag, Montreal and Marguerite Ethel Mackenzie (1873–1957), daughter of Hector Mackenzie (1843–1901), of Montreal. Both her parents enjoyed theatre. Her father, his cousin, and at least one of her aunts had been members of the Castanet Club of Montreal when they staged a production of The Mikado in 1886; and her maternal grandfather, Hector Mackenzie, had been President of Montreal Philharmonic Society.

Allan enjoyed an upbringing of unbridled wealth and privilege. She grew up between Ravenscrag, the Allan family mansion in Montreal's Golden Square Mile, and Montrose, the Allans' summer house at Cacouna. Her parents out-lived all their children, including Allan, who never married. Allan's two teenage sisters died in the sinking of the RMS Lusitania. Two years later, her only brother Hugh, a Flight Sub-Lieutenant in the Royal Naval Air Service, was shot down on his first service flight over the English Channel. Having trained as a nurse, Allan was injured in the same conflict while driving an ambulance that she had purchased in France at her own expense. After recovering in England, she remained there until the end of the war, serving on the staff of a hospital that was being administered by her mother in London.

Later, she lived in the Ravenscrag coach-house and held many lively meetings there with theatre types, sinking her energy, money, connections and passion into the task of building a vital theatre industry in Montreal. Edgar Allen Collard of the Montreal Gazette described Allan as,

Immensely self-assured, forceful and resourceful, with all manner of charm yet determined to carry out her plans. She was a woman capable of bringing together a group, with varying degrees of talent, compatibility and dedication, and welding them into an effective, hard-working whole. She was many-gifted herself. Frequently she took the leading roles. Her powers of readiness and initiative were astonishing. Nothing daunted her.

Following a serious illness, Allan took a trip with her parents to Victoria, British Columbia, dying after four weeks, on April 4, 1942. In 1935, her contribution to Canadian drama was recognized when she was given the Canadian Drama Award for outstanding service in the development of the Canadian theatre. Following Allan's death, having lost their leading spirit many feared the collapse of her Montreal Repertory Theatre, but her parents and other influential Montrealers were quick to jump in and the presidency was taken up by Charles Martin, son-in-law of Richard B. Angus. The MRT continued to run successfully up until 1961, and a trophy was donated in her name.

== Montreal Repertory Theatre ==
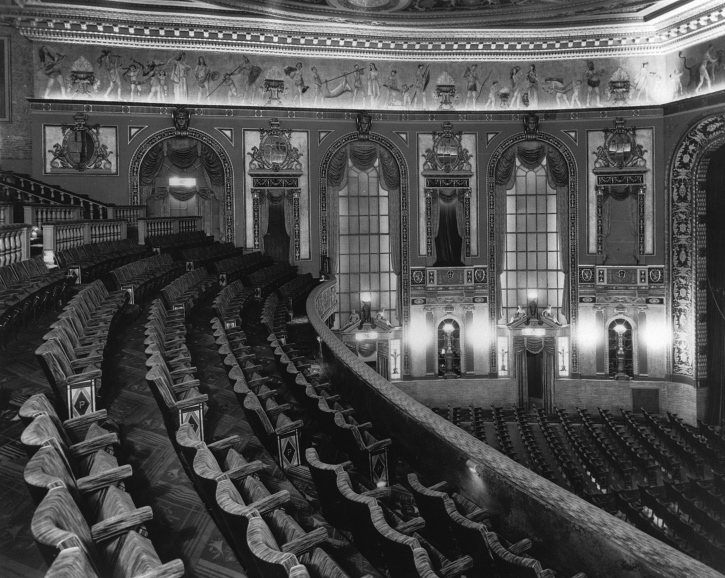
Palace Theatre, Montreal

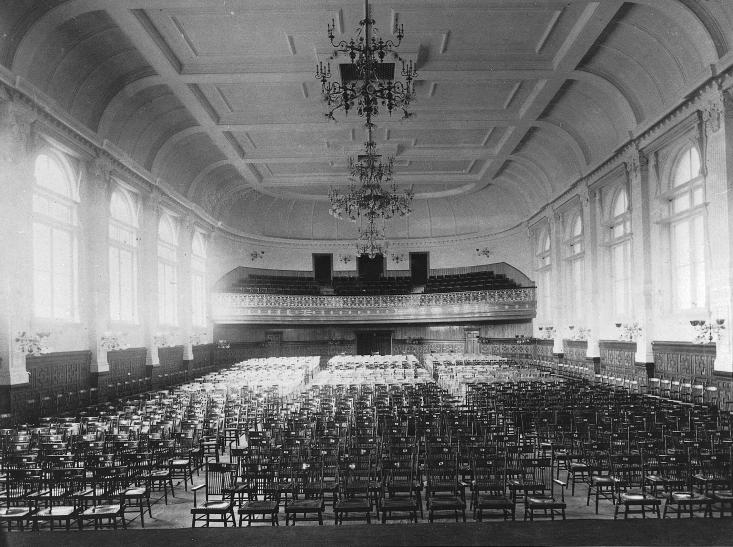
Concert Hall at the Windsor Hotel, Montreal

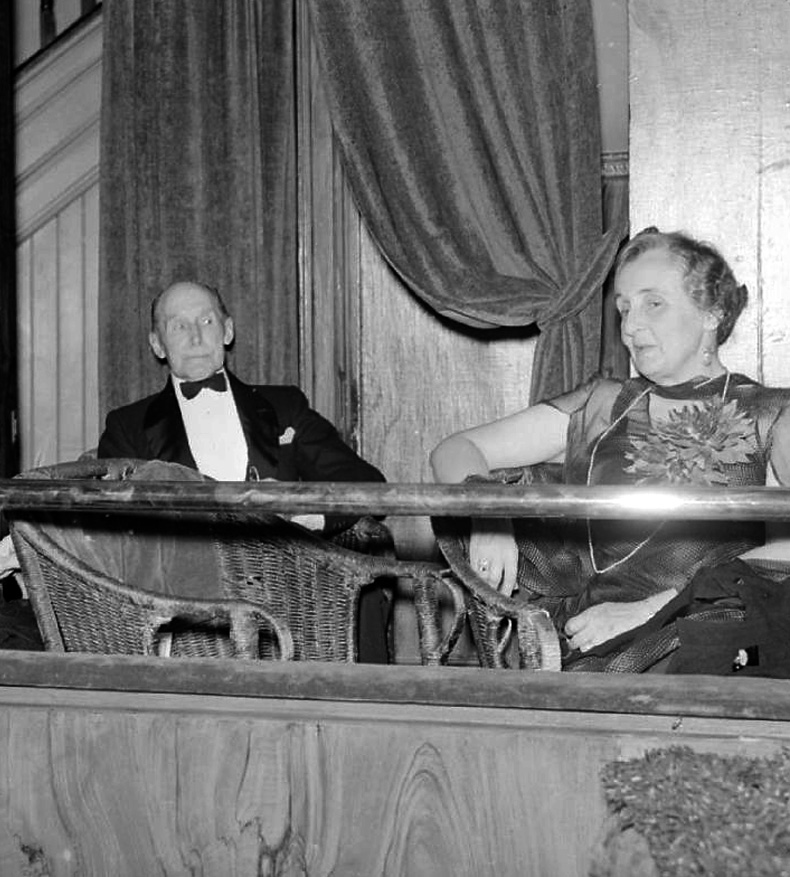
Martha's parents, Sir Montague and Lady Allan, at the Guy Street theatre, 1940

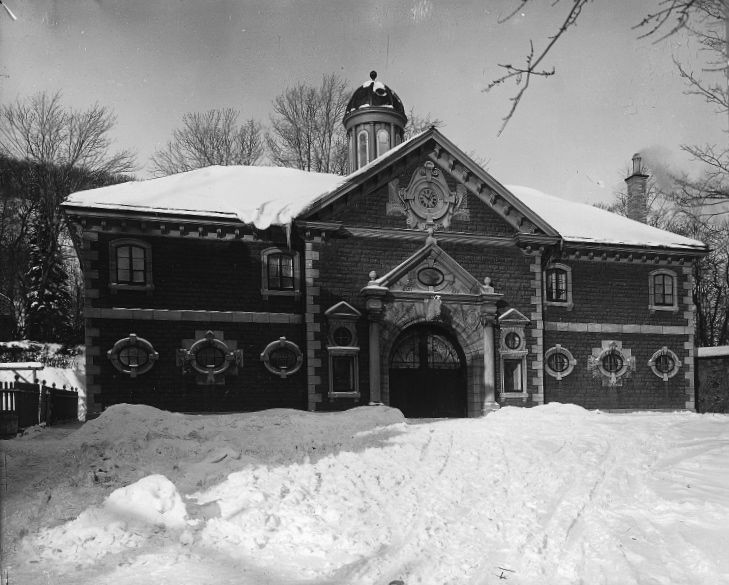
The stables at Ravenscrag, where Allan held meetings and rehearsals for the MRT

Before World War I, Allan studied theatre in Paris and came to know among others the actress Rita Jolivet, who remained a close family friend and later married Jimmy Bryce Allan, her Scottish cousin. In 1921, along with Rupert Caplan, Akkab was among the founders of the Community Players, with W.A. Tremayne as their stage director. They disbanded after four years and Caplan joined the Provincetown Players before returning and becoming a major force in Canadian radio, producing the Radio Theatre Guild with the Canadian Radio Broadcasting Commission. Allan gained a reputation for herself as a successful theatrical producer in various art theatres in the United States, most notably as the director of the Pasadena Little Theatre, one of the most respected institutions of the kind on the continent. Under Allan's directorship, the Pasadena Playhouse drew such local support that George Bernard Shaw dubbed Pasadena "the Athens of the West" referring to the city's enthusiasm for community theatre. She returned to Montreal in 1929, determined to establish a community theatre there at a time when 'live theatre' seemed in danger of extinction; the 'movies' having by then become the 'talkies'.

In 1929, Allan organised a meeting at Montreal to be led by Sir Barry Jackson, director of the Birmingham Repertory Theatre in England, in which he emphasised the success of the theatres at both Birmingham and Manchester and urged Montrealers to establish their own community theatre. Margaret Anglin, then Canada's best-known stage actress, who happened to be in town performing Oscar Wilde's Lady Windermere's Fan, also spoke in support of local theatre. Allan, of course, spoke too, and one year later, with much local support, particularly from Sir Andrew MacPhail, she founded the Montreal Theatre Guild, which came to be known as the Montreal Repertory Theatre, or the MRT.

Montreal's Rialto Theatre was used strictly for opera, and the Theatre Francais had burned down in 1900, as had the Palace Theatre in 1927. Jackson's meeting had been held only a few months after Montreal's other main stage theatre, Her Majesty's Theatre, Montreal, had been purchased by an American motion-picture chain, Consolidated Theatres. The very week after Jackson's meeting, the Orpheum Theatre, which had been the traditional stock company theatre in Montreal, was transformed - like many others - into the Popular Talkie Playhouse. These significant sweeping changes to the cultural scene swiftly galvanized Montreal's elite into supporting Allan's initiative. The MRT's opening night performances were packed to the rafters with old Montreal's social elite, all of whom Miss Allan knew intimately, many of them being close friends of, or related to her parents. Other than her parents, among the other principal donators to the establishment of the MRT were Athanase David, Madame Athanase David, General Sir Arthur Currie, Sir Edward Wentworth Beatty, Lt.-Colonel Herbert Molson, F.E. Meredith and Lord Atholstan.

Allan hated to have the word 'amateur' applied to the MRT; "amateur theatricals? I loathe them" she once said. By the mid-1930s, she had almost succeeded in her aim of making the MRT professional, and in its standards, it largely was. Unlike its predecessor, The Community Players, the MRT had established a traditional subscription series of plays, an experimental studio wing, a French section, a school for theatre training, an extensive library collection of theatre books and memorabilia, and an organization magazine - Cue - that kept subscribers up-to-date with all kinds of theatrical information. Allan was passionate about demanding the highest artistic standards at the MRT, and encouraged other local amateur groups to achieve the same level of artistic consistency. Moreover, the MRT was much more open than other significant Anglo-Montreal controlled institutions of the city, which were still firmly closed to French-Canadians, Jews and others. The MRT determined to produce plays in English, French and German, to make it accessible to all Montrealers, not just in the audience, but on the stage too.

The MRT had professional staff for its management and direction and an impressive number of MRT players went on to fame on the professional stage. Leo Ciceri was to be renowned at Stratford-upon-Avon and in New York City; Christopher Plummer and John Colicos both achieved world reputations - Colicos becoming the youngest actor ever to play Lear at London's Old Vic. Among many others who became professionals of distinction were the likes of Richard Easton and Madeleine Sherwood.

== Modern dance ==
At the same time that Allan was involved in promoting live theatre in Montreal, she also played a role in supporting modern dance, most notably when she directed dance performances in Montreal by such international artists as Harald Kreutzberg and Vicente Escudero.

== MRT's Guy Street Theatre ==
In the 1930s, Montreal was in heavy recession and despite Allan's best attempts to rally local wealth and political support, the MRT had suffered from never having had a real headquarters. At first, rehearsals had taken place at the Allans' coach-house at Ravenscrag. Plays were performed wherever a hall could be found, usually at McGill's Moyse Hall, Victoria Hall (home of the Montreal Academy of Music), the Ritz-Carlton and the Windsor hotels. Unable to purchase an existing theatre or construct a new one, in 1932, the MRT obtained a space in a building on Union Avenue, but more was needed.

The building that the MRT eventually acquired on Guy Street, had in the 1870s been the West-End School, and later served as a home for Protestant infants and as a dance academy. When the MRT took over the building it made many changes and constructed a little theatre with about 200 seats. As its productions ran for more than a week, the theatre gave more than a thousand Montrealers a chance to attend. The very smallness of the theatre gave it a sense of intimacy, creating a close bond between actors and audience.

When the MRT celebrated its twentieth anniversary with a performance of W. Somerset Maugham's The Constant Wife, Governor-General Vincent Massey appeared on the stage between the first and second acts with an impromptu speech: "MRT are three letters which have stood for very great distinction in the Canadian theatre".

In 1952, the Guy Street building blew up and all its contents were lost: the theatre, its equipment, the library, the museum, the costumes and the records. The MRT continued as it had done before, renting halls, until it acquired another theatre and headquarters in the old building of the Navy League of Canada on Closse Street. On Guy Street, a skyscraper was built over where the characterful little theatre had stood.

== Dominion Drama Festival ==
Allan worked closely with the Governor-General of Canada, Vere Ponsonby, 9th Earl of Bessborough, in helping to establish the Dominion Drama Festival with Colonel Osborne of Ottawa. In 1932, she staged Shakespeare's Hamlet in Moyse Hall, Montreal, with Lord Bessborough designing and superintending the stage settings, while his son, Viscount Duncannon, played the lead role. Trophies for the festival were donated by Lord Bessborough, Sir Barry Jackson of Birmingham, and her father's cousin-in-law, Sir Vincent Meredith. Meredith was the uncle of J. Stanley Meredith, who in 1932 had founded The Meredith Players at London, Ontario, becoming part of the London Little Theatre Company in 1934, and who were permanent fixtures at the Drama Festival.

The multi-lingual Allan founded a French theatre as well as the English-speaking MRT. It did so well at the Dominion Drama Festival in 1934 that the adjudicators said they had almost given it the prize. It eventually left MRT, but it had been one of the earlier French-language theatre groups in Montreal.

In the finals of 1938, held at London, Ontario, the MRT was presenting Father Malachy's Miracle. The actor who was to play the leading role fell ill en route to London and some recommended that the play should be withdrawn. Allan would not hear of it. She studied the script in the few available hours and went on stage to play the priest. The adjudicator, who was unaware that the role had been learnt by Miss Allan in just a few hours, selected her for special mention. She was said to be an even better director. Thomas Archer of the Montreal Gazette wrote,

"Miss Allan could walk in at the last moment, so to speak, and put a hopeless situation into what it ought to be for the 'customers' on the opening night. She was also an organiser with a remarkable way of making the right decision when every other decision had failed."

— Montreal Gazette, September 23, 1972

== MRT's wartime work ==
An example of Allan's ability for quick improvisation was demonstrated at the outbreak of the World War II. Nobody seemed to know what the MRT should do, and many suggested it should be disbanded, but Allan insisted it should go on and made it a branch of the Canadian Red Cross with its own work-room. She turned the MRT itself into a wartime service.

The MRT formed its own 'Tin Hat Revue' for the entertainment of the troops, and with a portable stage and equipment it declared itself ready to present its repertoire of songs, skits and dancing numbers anywhere, at any time. It once gave four shows within twenty-four hours at Camp Petawawa. The 'Tin Hats' were a forerunner of the famed Army Show.

Nevertheless, the war saw a huge decrease of spectator subscriptions, on which the company heavily relied to make money. About a month after Allen's death, the Montreal Gazette reported "Before the war the MRT members bought 1,500 double subscriptions but it is reported that within the last two years this dropped to about half." The five annual major productions were reduced from six to three representations each.
