= Clara Dennis =

Canadian photographer and writer

Clarissa Archibald "Clara" Dennis (November 24, 1881 – February 16, 1958) was a Canadian photographer and writer who lived in Nova Scotia. She died in Halifax at the age of 76. Many of her photographs are now held in the collections of the Nova Scotia Archives and the Nova Scotia Museum. These thousands of images capture the people and places of her time, including a collection of images of Mi'kmaq people from that period.

== Early life ==
The daughter of Senator William Dennis and Agnes Miller, she was born in Truro and moved to Halifax with her family at a young age. She was educated at Mount Allison College, Dalhousie University and Halifax Business College. She worked for her father's newspaper, the Halifax Herald, until his death in 1920.

During World War I, Dennis offered her home to thousands of soldiers and was a strong support of initiatives to support prisoners of war and foreign troops that were stationed or visiting Halifax.

Dennis was a life member of the Nova Scotia Historical Society.

== Works ==
Dennis published several travel books illustrated with her own photographs:

- Down in Nova Scotia: My Own, My Native Land (1934)
- More about Nova Scotia: My Own, My Native Land (1937)
- Cape Breton Over (1942)

Dennis wrote a number of travel articles for newspapers and magazines. She also provided the chapter on Nova Scotia for The Spirit of Canada, a souvenir booklet produced for King George VI and Queen Elizabeth on their 1939 Canadian tour.

== Recognition ==
In 1938, she was awarded an honorary Doctor of Literature by Mount Allison University.
