= Dennis Building =

Historic building in Halifax, Nova Scotia

- Former names: Kenny building
- Alternative names: Kenny-Dennis Building

General information
- Status: Completed
- Type: Office building
- Architectural style: Georgian architecture (1841); Victorian architecture (1863 ) Edwardian architecture (1912)
- Location: 1740 Granville Street, Halifax, Nova Scotia, Canada
- Coordinates: 44.6488°N 63.5741°W
- Construction started: 1841
- Completed: 1863
- Renovated: 1863, 1912
- Owner: Government of Nova Scotia

Design and construction
- Architects: David Stirling (1863); Henry David Jost (1912)
- Designations

Nova Scotia Heritage Property Act
- Type: Provincially Registered Property
- Designated: 2018

The Dennis Building, also known as the Kenny-Dennis Building, is a historic building in Halifax, Nova Scotia, Canada. It was listed as a registered heritage property in 2018.

== History ==
Situated at 1740 Granville Street, it is across from the Province House in downtown Halifax in the province of Nova Scotia.

=== Kenny Building ===
Initially known as the Kenny Building, it was named after Thomas and Edward Kenny's early venture as dry goods merchants on George and Granville Streets in Halifax. Construction on the building began in 1841, with the initial design featuring a two-and-a-half-storey Georgian stone warehouse and a hipped roof.

The building was redeveloped in 1863 to house the dry goods firm T. & E. Kenny, owned by the Kenny brothers. During this period, the Scottish-born architect David Stirling was tasked with planning the building's redevelopment, while George Blaiklock handled the construction.

Edward Kenny, together with his son, later established the Merchants' Bank of Halifax in 1901, a precursor to the Royal Bank of Canada.

=== Dennis Building ===
The property was acquired in 1900 by William Dennis, owner of the Halifax Herald, when T. & E. Kenny, Wholesale Goods, moved locations. The building was renovated with offices to serve as the headquarters of the Halifax Herald and the Evening Mail, two Halifax newspapers owned by Dennis.

The Halifax & Bermudas Cable Company had a prominent position in the upper floors of the Dennis Building. The Dennis Building connected to the Canadian Pacific Railway's telegraph system, providing communication across Canada. A dedicated landline linked it directly to Bamfield, Vancouver, the Pacific Cable's terminus for Australia and New Zealand, and also connected to a cable reaching the West Indies via Bermuda. All these lines operated from the Dennis Building.

=== Fire ===
Nearly destroyed by fire in 1912, the Dennis building was extensively damaged. Architect Henry David Jost was commissioned to restore the interior and add three new floors.

The new additions were constructed in concrete and steel by Samuel Manners Brookfield under the design plans of Jost. Neighboring buildings at the intersection of Barrington and George underwent reconstruction.

In 1913, the building's lessor, Dennis Realty Corporation, leased the top floor of the Dennis building to The Department of Militia and Defence. The building became the home office of The Trinidad Electric Co by 1927. After The Herald moved, the Halifax Dennis Building was acquired and repurposed by the Government of Nova Scotia as office space for provincial government employees.

=== Present day ===
Registered as a heritage property in 2018, the Kenny-Dennis building's designation followed a third-party application opposed at first by the provincial government.

== Architecture ==
Initially constructed in 1841, the original structure was designed in the Georgian architecture style. When David Stirling redeveloped it in 1863, he introduced elements of Victorian architecture. Stirling designed the first four storeys. The later redevelopment by George Henry Jost in 1912 saw the Dennis building transformed with Edwardian architecture elements. Jost was responsible for adding the top three storeys to the four-storey structure. Each renovation added a layer of architectural history.
