= Sir Thomas Skinner, 1st Baronet =

British-born publisher and Canadian businessman (1840–1926)

Sir Thomas Skinner Bt
- Born: Thomas Skinner; 23 November 1840; Bristol, England
- Died: 11 May 1926; Chelsea, London, England
- Resting place: Heene Cemetery
- Citizenship: British subject
- Occupations: Financial journalist; Businessman
- Parent: James Skinner

Sir Thomas Skinner, 1st Baronet, (23 November 1840 – 11 May 1926), born Thomas Skinner was a British-born financial writer, publisher, and businessman who became a director of the Canadian Pacific Railway and governor of the Hudson's Bay Company.

== Early life ==
Thomas Skinner was born on 23 November 1840 in Bristol, England. His father was James Skinner of Bristol.

As a young man, he relocated from Bristol to London in the early 1860s.

== Career ==
=== Financial Journalist career ===
Early on, Skinner went into journalism. Around 21, as Joint-stock company activities flourished post-Companies Act 1862, he began his financial journalist career in London. He was a regular contributor to the Daily Chronicle.

Amid speculation, inflation, and the Panic of 1866, he established himself in the financial press with incisive analysis, conciseness, and firm independence. He later published his debut work after years of writing for provincial newspapers.

=== Publishing career ===
==== Stock Exchange Year Book ====
Between 1874 and 1875, he compiled and published the first edition of The Stock Exchange Year-Book, an annual publication covering an overview of joint-stock companies and public securities in the UK market for investors. It was first published at five shillings, and contained over 200 pages, gradually increasing year by year. By October 1883, it had reached its tenth year.

==== Directory of Directors ====
In May 1880, he compiled and edited the first annual publication of the Directory of Directors which was published in London. Skinner used company reports and other reliable sources to compile the information on around 6,000 directors and their companies in industry, commerce, and finance. The 1881 issue, published at the Royal Exchange buildings, featured 7,500 directors and grew from 272 to 384 pages.

==== The London Banks ====
That same year in 1880, the financial journalist set out to acquire the copyright of London Banks and Kindred Companies and Firms. It was originally published in December 1865 under the title The London Banks, Credit, Discount, and Finance Companies. In November 1880, Skinner replaced Edwin Utley as the chief editor and publisher of London Banks, and Kindred Companies and Firms. The publication compiled information regarding banks and companies that made up the London Money Market. In 1881, the Leeds Mercury reported, "Mr. Skinner has already added features to it which increase its value."

==== Bankers' Almanac ====
Skinner later took over a semi-annual publication established in 1844–45 titled the Bankers' Almanac in East Grinstead, England. It became popularly known as "Skinner's" and was a directory of thousands of major banks in alphabetical order. The periodical London Banks and Kindred Companies and Firms was merged into the Bankers' Almanac in 1919.

=== Canadian Pacific Railway Co. ===
In 1881, an invitation was extended for the well-known financial journalist to become involved in Canadian matters. He developed an interest in railroads during an early visit to Canada, when the Canadian Pacific Railway was in its infancy.

In February 1881, the Canadian Pacific Railway Company was incorporated to build and manage a transcontinental railway extending from St. John, New Brunswick, and Montreal, Quebec, to Vancouver, British Columbia. Skinner aligned himself with members of the CPR syndicate in promoting the project to British investors. His influence and understanding of London's financial markets proved instrumental in securing the necessary backing from the U.K.

==== Canada North-West Land Co. ====
In 1882, the Canadian Pacific Railway Co. established the British-Canadian Canada North-West Land Company. Its board of directors was chaired by Thomas Skinner.

==== The Canadian Gazette ====
Seeking to introduce Canada to a British audience, he founded and edited the Canadian Gazette in London starting in April 1883. The weekly paper featured Canadian news, emigration topics, and investment opportunities. It was primarily financed by George Stephen, 1st Baron Mount Stephen who had recently resigned as President of the Bank of Montreal to focus on the newly-formed Canadian Pacific Railway. Skinner became regarded as a leading authority on Canadian investments.

==== Colonization Board ====
On 26 December 1888, a board was temporarily established to coordinate the migration of crofters and cottars from the congested Western Highlands and Scottish islands. The Crofter Emigration Board was composed of Schomberg Kerr, 9th Marquess of Lothian, the Secretary for Scotland; Sir Charles Tupper, the High Commissioner for the Dominion of Canada in London; Sir John Muir, 1st Baronet, the Lord Provost of Glasgow; and Thomas Skinner of the North-West Land Co.

The board had been reconstituted in November 1891, given extended authority over the Congested Districts Board for Ireland, and joined by Sir Horace Plunkett. Officially appointed by Queen Victoria in 1891, for many years he served on the Imperial Colonization Board. The Colonization Board was established with the aim of populating and developing the Dominion of Canada. He served as one of the commissioners for the administration of funds provided by the British Parliament to support Canadian colonization.

==== CPR Director ====
Skinner was first elected to the Canadian Pacific Railway Company's board of directors In May 1889.

In August 1889, after traveling with CPR President William Cornelius Van Horne across the Canadian North-West, the CPR director, chairman of the Northwest Land Co., and royal commissioner was impressed by the region's condition and potential. He did, however, address a problem with a stretch of the Government Railway along the Thompson River.

Later that year in November, he was appointed as the London-based financial agent and advisor for the Canadian Pacific Railway Company.

=== Pillsbury-Washburn Flour Mills Co. ===
He was appointed chairman of the board of the Pillsbury-Washburn Flour Mills Co. Ltd. in 1889, following a British financial syndicate's acquisition and merger of Pillsbury with a competitor.

=== Hudson's Bay Co. ===
Thomas Skinner was appointed a member of the Committee of the Hudson's Bay Company (HBC) on 29 July 1890 to replace Sir Charles Russell.

=== Commercial Cable Co. ===
In April 1891, he was elected as a Director of the Commercial Cable Company which was registered in 1883. He announced the news to the public in the Canadian Gazette. The company was engaged in manufacturing and owning both underwater telegraph cables and land-based lines.

=== Bank of Montreal ===
In 1894, Skinner became a member (and later chairman) of the London-based advisory board of the Bank of Montreal on 22 Abchurch Lane. Serving from the mid-1890s to the 1920s, he worked on the committee with Alexander Lang and Sir Donald Smith, 1st Baron Strathcona and Mount Royal, who presided over the bank's board of directors.

He was recommended to the Canadian Government in 1894 as Peter Redpath's successor on the Imperial Institute's Council. He was appointed, at their request, as a governor of the institute representing the Northwest Territories. At this time, he lived at Broughton Lodge, Highgate, worked from 1 Royal Exchange Buildings, E.C., and was affiliated with London's Junior Athenaeum Club.

The Canadian Pacific Railway Company director worked closely on advancing railway interests with James J. Hill, the Canadian president of the Great Northern Railway, and George Stephen, former BMO president and cousin of Sir Donald A. Smith. He was among four who signed the London agreement on 10 May 1895 to acquire the Northern Pacific Railway for the Great Northern Railway.

=== Halifax & Bermuda Co. ===
In 1897, Thomas Skinner held the roles of Trustee and Director for the Halifax and Bermudas Cable Company, alongside Sir Donald A. Smith. In London, he chaired the board of directors, including Charles R. Hosmer, T.G.H. G’ynn, and Joseph Rippon.

==== Direct West India Cable Co. ====
The Direct West India Cable Company Ltd. was founded on 2 August 1897 to take over a contract between the Halifax & Bermuda Co. and the British government for managing a submarine cable route linking Bermuda, Jamaica, and Turks Island. Following its registration on 1 September 1897, Skinner maintained roles as Trustee and Director of the Direct West India Cable Company Ltd. alongside Lord Strathcona, serving as chairman at its British headquarters on Old Broad Street. Banking services for the company were provided by the Bank of Montreal. By 1915, his son T. Hewitt Skinner was also a director of the firm.

At the end of the 19th century, Skinner was appointed Deputy Governor of Hudson's Bay Company in London, succeeding Earl of Lichfield Sir Donald Smith.

=== Stock Exchange Gazette ===
In 1901, T. Skinner & Co. was publishing the Stock Exchange Gazette in London at 330 Gresham House. The publication edited by Thomas Skinner issued weekly details of companies formed in Guernsey.

=== Mackay Companies ===
In 1903, he was elected to the Mackay Companies, a voluntary association formed by Clarence H. Mackay (fellow Commercial Cable Company director) under the trust deed of 19 December 1902. The Commercial Cable Co. became a subsidiary under the Mackay Companies. Holding the entire capital stock of Commercial Cable Co., the association also owned full or partial shares in multiple telegraph and cable companies in the U.S., Canada, and Europe, including Postal Telegraph and Cable Co. On February 16, 1914, he was unanimously voted in as an additional trustee for the Mackay Companies. He was its first representative in England.

He presented the President of The Canada Club in London with a chain and badge of office in 1909.

=== Skinner Baronetcy ===
London's Canadian Club hosted Skinner as a principal guest on 8 February 1912. Thomas Skinner was granted the Skinner baronetcy, a title in the Baronetage of the United Kingdom, on 9 February 1912. His title was conferred by His Majesty, following the recommendation of Prime Minister H. H. Asquith, in honor of his dedicated service to the British Empire, notably in connection with Canada and the West Indies. Speeches were made by Viscount Goschen, Lord Furness, and Alfred Smithers.

=== HBC Governor ===
Skinner lost a longtime associate in 1914 with the death of Lord Strathcona, Sir Donald Smith, who had served as Governor of the Hudson's Bay Company for 25 years. 74 year old Sir Thomas Skinner was then appointed governor and Leonard D. Cunliffe filled the vacancy of deputy governor. Fittingly, the company's motto was "Pro Pelle Cutem" (a pelt for a skin).

The well-known business man, economist, and statistician held the position for two years before resigning. On 19 September 1915, he sent his letter of resignation to committee member Robert Kindersley, 1st Baron Kindersley, who was subsequently elected as Governor in 1916. His son, T. Hewitt Skinner, 2nd Baronet, succeeded him on the committee.

=== Canadian War Contingent Association ===
On 15 August 1914, Sir Thomas Skinner was appointed chairman of the newly formed Canadian War Contingent Association during a major gathering of Canadians at London's Westminster Palace Hotel. Presided over by the Hon. G. H. Perley, the meeting brought together leading figures such as Lady Strathcona, Lady Kirkpatrick, Sir William Osler, and others from Canadian banking, railway, and shipping circles. The Association aimed to provide support for Canadian troops arriving in Britain during the early stages of World War I.

=== Laurentide Co. ===
In 1915, Sir Thomas Skinner was elected to the Laurentide board of directors. After the death of Sir William Van Horne, he replaced Montreal businessman Charles Hosmer who became vice-president of the company. The Laurentide Company, Ltd., a manufacturer of wood pulp, paper, and cardboard, was incorporated under Canadian laws in 1911 and acquired the assets of the Laurentide Paper Co. Ltd. By 1920, Sir Thomas Skinner was serving on the boards of the Laurentide Company, Ltd., the Canadian Pacific Railway Co., and the Canada North-West Land Co., along with a number of other Canadian corporations. Skinner held a seat on the Laurentide board until 1923, and returned in 1924–25. He had gradually expanded his holdings in the company, owning 500 shares from 1903, increasing to 1,333 by 1911, and 3,999 shares from the 1920s until his passing.

Following the vacancy created by his death, Reginald McKenna, was appointed as a director at the Canadian Pacific Railway Company.

== Personal life ==
He was married twice. He met Sarah Margaret Hewitt, daughter of Jonah Barnett Hewitt of London, whom he married on 17 March 1866. He had four children with Sarah Margaret. His eldest son, Thomas Hewitt Skinner, was born on 12 June 1875. As the heir of the baronetcy, he was known as Sir Thomas Hewitt Skinner, 2nd Baronet. He later became a partner in his father's firm Thomas Skinner and Co. After the death of his first wife in February 1902, he married Martha Lauretta in May, the widow of Charles James Williamson and daughter of Job Long.

By October 1910, Skinner resided on 22 Pont Street in Chelsea, London and at The Gables, Worthing with offices at 77–81 Gresham House. He was a Justice of the peace of Middlesex.

== Death ==
Sir Thomas Skinner, 1st Baronet died at 86 on 11 May 1926 in Chelsea, London, England.

On 17 May 1926, his memorial service took place at St. Michael's, Cornhill and drew a large crowd. His burial took place in Heene Cemetery.

His estate, probated after his death, was valued at £321,000 ($1,556,850).

Preceded by Donald Smith, 1st Baron Strathcona and Mount Royal	Governor of the Hudson's Bay Company; 1914–1916	Succeeded by Robert Kindersley, 1st Baron Kindersley
