= Agnes Dennis =

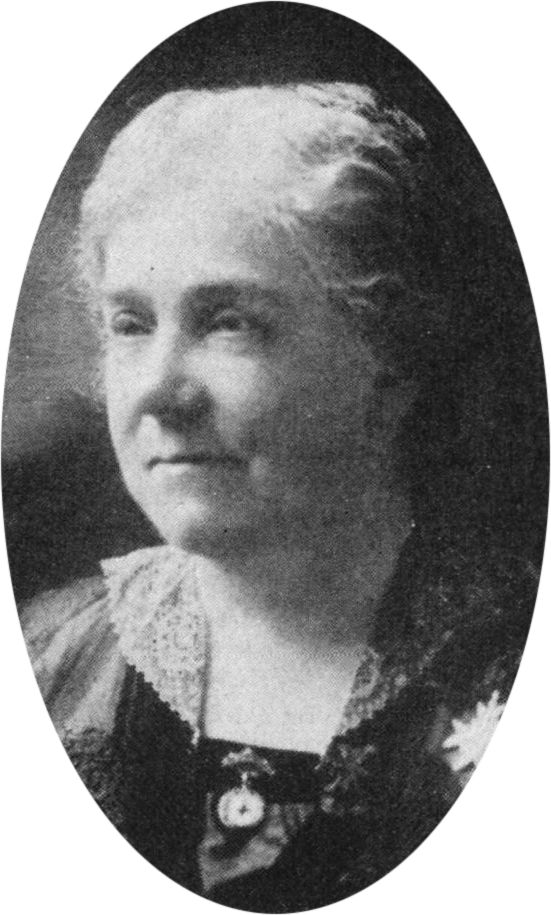
Agnes Dennis Halifax Nova Scotia

Agnes Dennis, CBE (11 April 1859 – 21 April 1947) was an educator and feminist in Nova Scotia, Canada. She was one of the Nova Scotia 5 who was active in the Local Council of Women of Halifax.

The daughter of Alexander Miller and Sarah Archibald, she was born Agnes Miller in Truro and studied at the Model and Normal Schools there. She taught at the Model School for two years and then married William Dennis, later senator and newspaper publisher, in 1878.

She served as president of the Halifax branch of the Victorian Order of Nurses and the Nova Scotia Red Cross. Dennis helped organize relief efforts following the Halifax Explosion of 1917. She also ran the Halifax Herald after the death of her husband in 1920. She had 10 children.

She died in Halifax at the age of 88.

Her daughter Clara produced a series of travel books on Nova Scotia illustrated with her own photographs.
