= Charles Hosmer =

Canadian businessman (1851–1927)

Charles Rudolph Hosmer
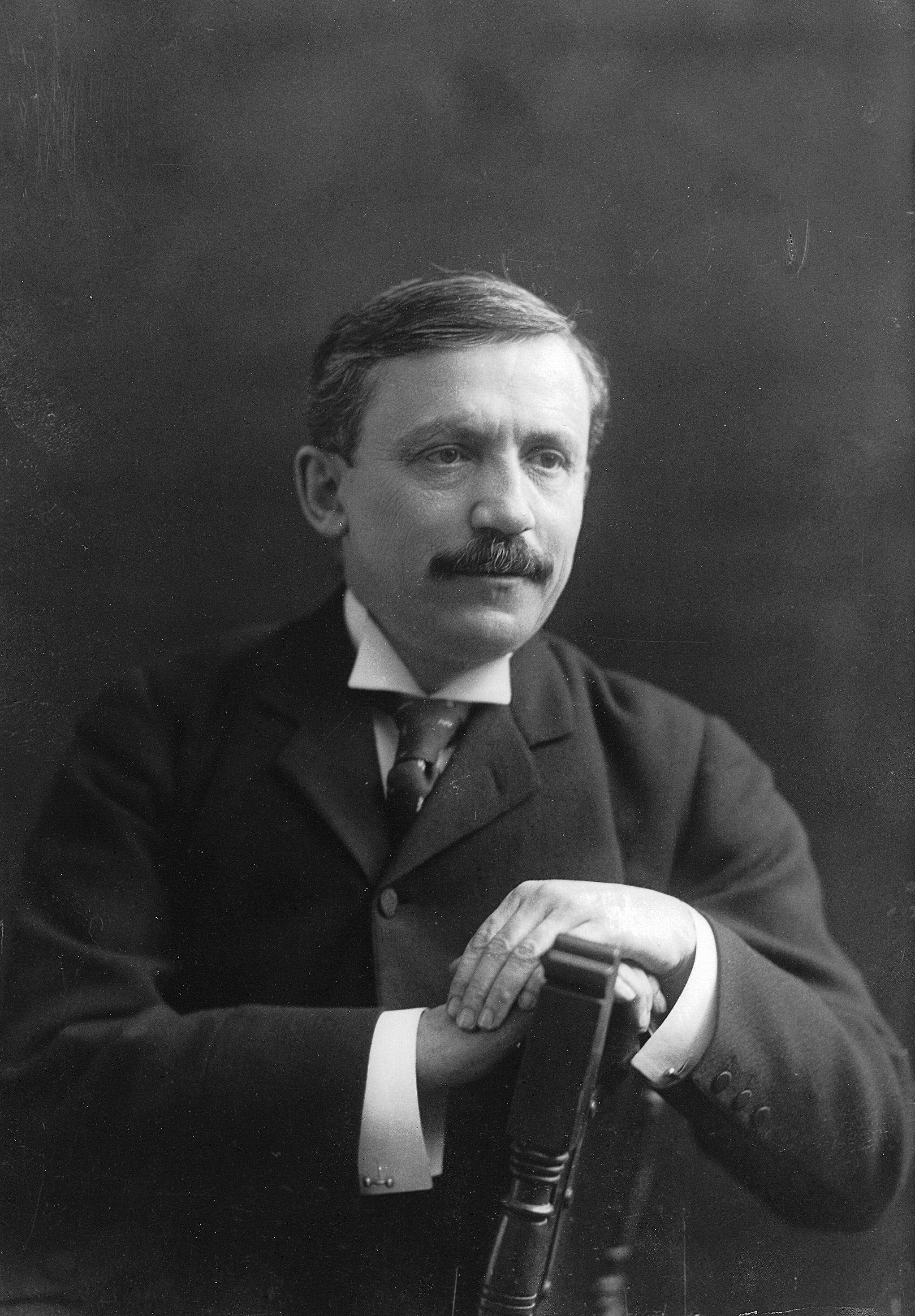
- Born: 12 November 1851; Coteau-Landing, Canada East
- Died: 14 November 1927 (aged 76); Montreal, Quebec, Canada
- Occupations: financier and capitalist.
- Known for: The creation of the Ritz-Carlton Hotel, Montreal.

Charles Rudolph Hosmer (November 12, 1851 - November 14, 1927), was a Montreal businessman and the man whose idea it was to create the Ritz-Carlton Hotel, Montreal. Since 1900, he was considered the most important figure in Telegraphy in Canada.

== Career ==
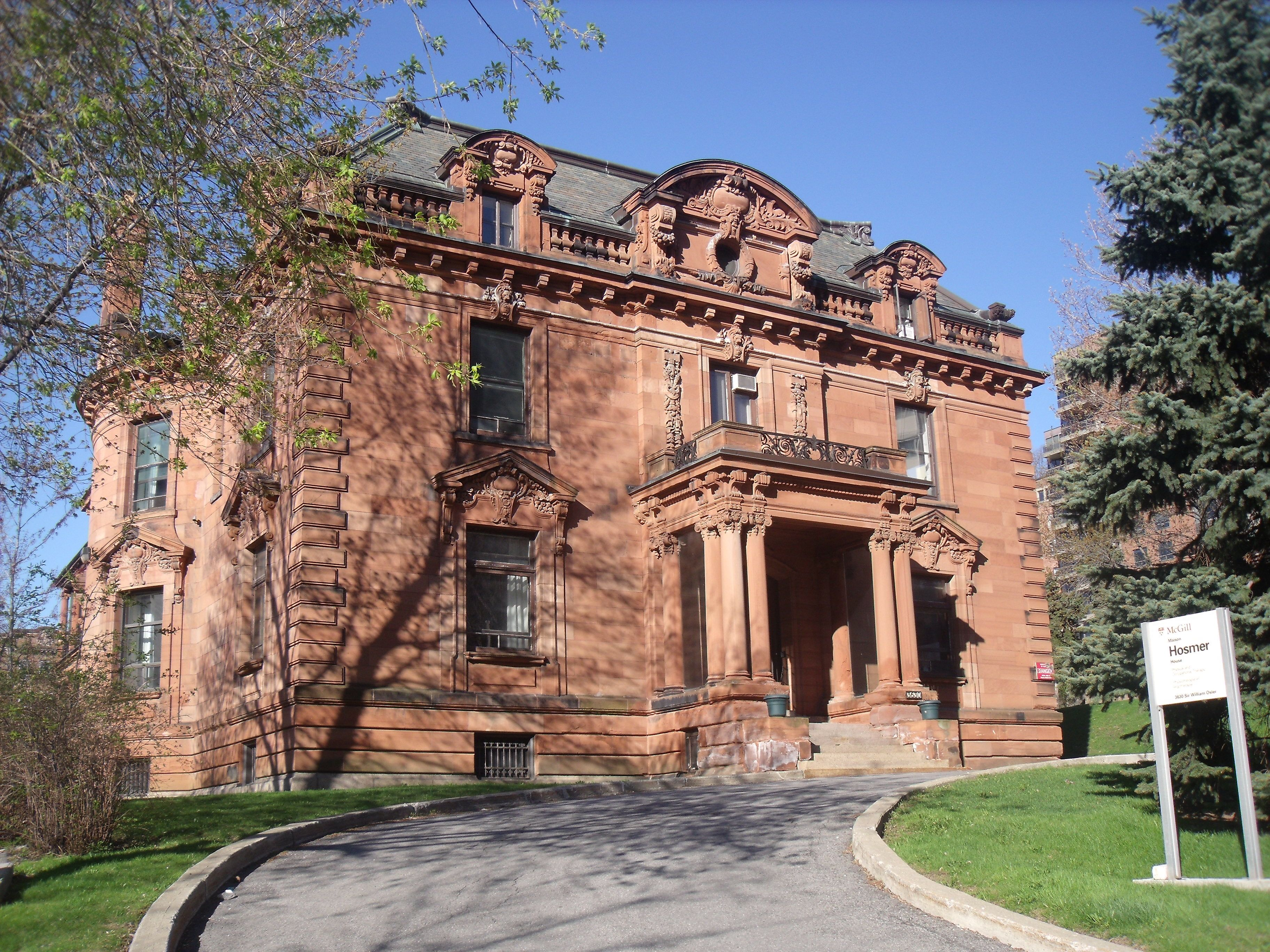
Charles Hosmer House, Drummond Street; built 1901

In 1851, Hosmer was born at Coteau-Landing, Canada East. He began work as a Telegraphist with the Grand Trunk Railway Telegraph Company, later joining the Dominion Telegraph Company of which he became superintendent and then president. In September 1881, the Dominion and Montreal Telegraph Companies merged with Hosmer as president and General Manager of the Canada Mutual Telegraph Company with headquarters in Montreal. In 1886 he was appointed General Manager of the Canadian Pacific Railway Telegraph Service, retiring to turn his attentions to various other business opportunities. By the end of his life, Hosmer had numerous business affiliations, being a director of twenty six companies including the Bank of Montreal, the Sun Life Assurance Company of Canada, the Canadian Pacific Railway, the Halifax and Bermudas Cable Company, and the West Indies Cable Company. He was President of Canadian Cottons Ltd. and the Ogilvie Flour Mills Company. He died at Montreal, leaving $20 million to his two children.

== Private life ==
Hosmer was known for his liveliness and wit, becoming a close friend of both Edward VII and César Ritz. His home on Upper Drummond Street in Montreal's Golden Square Mile was to some a suitable showcase of his wealth, while to others it was viewed as pretentious. He collected a magnificent art collection which included four Canalettos. His son, Elwood Bigelow Hosmer (1879–1947) made an attempt to fly across the Atlantic Ocean in 1927, surviving after coming down near the Azores.

== Ritz Carlton ==
In 1909, having seen the success of the Hôtel Ritz Paris started by his friend César Ritz, Hosmer set into motion the creation of the Ritz-Carlton Hotel, Montreal. Gaining the support of Sir Herbert Holt, Sir Montagu Allan, Sir Charles Gordon and Charles Meredith, he formed the nucleus of the Carlton Hotel Company of Montreal.
