= Dominion Drama Festival =

The Dominion Drama Festival was an organisation in Canada that sought to promote amateur theatre across the country. It lasted, in one form or another, from 1932 until 1978.

== Founding ==
The Dominion Drama Festival (DDF) was devised in 1932 as a way to promote theatre being created in Canada. An annual event held each spring in a different city across the country, it would begin with small competitions in various parts of Canada. Whichever were chosen from these regional competitions, judged by a travelling adjudicator, would move on to compete in the national festival. To be as fair as possible, a separate judge would preside over the festival at the national level. Prizes were awarded for the best performance of a full-length play in either English or French, for best director, visual presentation, best actor and best actress. Prizes were also awarded at the regional level, including best presentation of a play written by a Canadian.

Vere Brabazon Ponsonby, 9th Earl of Bessborough, Governor General of Canada and a founding member of the Dominion Drama Festival.

One of the founding members was Vere Ponsonby, 9th Earl of Bessborough, the Governor General of Canada, who announced its creation at a ceremony at Rideau Hall. Other notable founding members included the heiress Martha Allan, along with playwright Herman Voaden, Vincent Massey, and Rupert Harvey, a British actor-director who became the Festival’s first adjudicator. Adjudicators were required to be bilingual, and from either Britain or France until after the Second World War.

== History ==
The first DDF was naturally held in Ottawa in April 1933 on Shakespeare’s birthday, with companies from eight provinces presenting one-act plays and excerpts from full-length plays. The first 5 festivals (Apr 1933-37) were held in Ottawa, after which they rotated among different cities.

The DDF played a role in the construction of a national identity and a national theatre through its insistence on retaining a bilingual mandate, and fostering the writing of original plays and providing coast-to-coast training for hundreds of career-oriented actors, directors and technicians. However, it also fostered a conservative approach to theatre, favouring productions of foreign plays and discouraging the participation of politically or socially disruptive plays. But this also led to remarkable standards, and attracted loyal and fashionable audiences. By the 1950s, the social aspects of the annual competition had almost eclipsed the plays, with balls and receptions, and dinner parties in formal attire.

The DDF was suspended during the Second World War and once it was resumed following the war, the development of professional theatres began to challenge the primacy of the DDF in the theatre culture of Canada. Professional actors no longer worked in amateur productions, and the newly formed Canada Council started in 1957 funded only professional involvement. Recurring financial problems necessitated the controversial patronage of Calvert's Distillers (1952–60) and the Canadian Association of Broadcasters (1961–65), which in turn allowed an Ottawa office and the hiring of a permanent director. From 1960 Canadians were engaged to adjudicate preliminary runoffs and, after 1965, the finals as well. There was a massive success with the All Canadian Festival during centennial year, but this didn't help with the DDF's growing debt.

In 1970 the DDF was renamed Theatre Canada, showcasing amateur productions without the element of competition, but, these fringe-like innovations were cancelled in 1973 for financial reasons. By 1978 the Ottawa office had closed, and with it the DDF.

== Rules and operation ==
As of 1937, a regional contest was held in 11 divisions to elect finalists to take part in the national final competition. The divisions were Nova Scotia and PEI, New-Brunswick, Eastern Quebec, Western Quebec, Eastern Ontario, Western Ontario, Saskatchewan, Manitoba, Alberta and British-Columbia. Registration cost was $20 per company. Each regional finalist would also win a grant; $150 for New Brunswick and Nova Scotia, $200 for Manitoba, $300 for Alberta, $350 for Saskatchewan, $400 for British-Columbia.

== Epilogue ==
After the collapse of Theatre Canada, Canada's amateur theatre was represented, both in Canada and internationally, by the National Multicultural Theatre Association (1975–1987).

== References and notes ==
1. Herbert Whittaker, The Oxford Companion to Canadian Theatre. Toronto: Oxford, 1989.

2. Betty Lee. Love and Whiskey: The Story of the Dominion Drama Festival. Toronto: McClelland and Stewart, 1973.
