= Halifax and Bermudas Cable Company =

Former British cable company

Halifax & Bermudas Cable Company Ltd.
- Formerly: The Halifax and Bermudas Cable Company
- Company type: Public
- Industry: Telecommunications industry
- Founded: 1889 in London, England

The Halifax and Bermudas Cable Company Ltd. was a British operating firm based in London which operated a cable company connecting from Nova Scotia to the British West Indies.

== History ==
=== Early planning and recommendations ===
In 1884, a Royal Commission recommended establishing a direct cable link between the British West Indies and Halifax, Nova Scotia. Bermuda's role as a strategic military and naval center made it essential to establish rapid communication, especially during emergencies and in times of peace. The island was the central point of the North American and West Indian naval stations. Given Bermuda's vital military and colonial position, telegraphic communication was proposed to facilitate faster exchanges, replacing the slower fortnightly mail service as the primary link. This link would enable the governor of Bermuda to stay in direct contact with the military officers in Halifax.

In the early months of 1889, efforts to approve the construction of a submarine telegraph line were in motion. The Halifax and Bermudas Cable Company was addressed in the British House of Commons on June 25, 1889. Sir Charles Cameron, 1st Baronet, MP for Glasgow College, questioned the financial secretary to the Treasury regarding a contractual deposit of £15,000. As stipulated in the submarine telegraph contract, the deposit was required to be submitted to the paymaster general within a month of the House's contract approval. In response, Mr. Jackson, the secretary, confirmed that the deposit was received on June 7, 1889, and subsequently invested in the name of the paymaster general.

=== Formation and incorporation ===
The Halifax and Bermudas Cable Company was incorporated under the Companies Act 1862. Its formal registration occurred during the summer of 1889. Winchester House on Old Broad Street hosted the first formal general meeting on September 20, 1889, which was presided over by Sir Alexander Armstrong. The new English joint-stock company was initially formed as The Halifax and Bermudas Cable Company in 1890. Its offices were located at No. 33 Old Broad Street in London. In the Bermuda Islands, The Halifax and Bermuda Cable Company Act was finalized in 1890. Offices in Hamilton were established in the Saltus Buildings, located on Front Street.

=== Submarine telegraph contract ===
W.T. Henley was soon commissioned to manufacture and lay a 870 nm telegraph cable from Halifax, Nova Scotia to Hamilton, Bermuda's British Naval harbour. At the northern shore of Halifax, the S.S. Westmeath, a cable layer, arrived from London on June 16, 1890, and the ship began toward Bermuda's Cable Beach on the 24th to lay undersea cable between the two points of British territory.

The cable was designed in five segments to account for varying underwater conditions. The Bermuda shore end about six inches in diameter, the Halifax shore end, the intermediate sections, designated "A" and "B", and the deep sea section.

=== Completion and operational launch ===
A telegraph message was sent by the governor of Bermuda Sir Charles Knowles to Queen Victoria on July 10, 1890. Four days later, on July 14, 1890, the public was granted access to the cable telegraph service in Hamilton. In Hamilton, a public demonstration occurred, and Charles V. Ingham held a dinner at the Royal Bermuda Yacht Club for those involved in the project's completion. In the Bermuda Islands, it was one of two cables companies.

On January 21, 1891, St. George's Town Hall began operating a branch office linked to Hamilton's cable office via landline, ensuring confidential and prompt cablegram transmission. Local telegram rates were set at threepence for 20 words, plus a penny per additional five words.

In 1891, Joseph Rippon, formerly general superintendent at the Halifax & Bermudas Cable Co.'s Bermuda headquarters, advanced to general manager in London, and L.G. Martin assumed his role as Bermuda's superintendent. The company's trustees were Donald Smith, 1st Baron Strathcona and Mount Royal and Sir Thomas Skinner, 1st Baronet. The directors included its chairman Sir Thomas Skinner, Esq. (also director of the Canadian Pacific Railway Company), T.G.H G'ynn, Charles R. Hosmer, and Joseph Rippon.

=== Expansion to Jamaica and Turks ===
The Halifax and Bermudas Cable Company entered into a contract on August 2, 1897, to build, lay, and maintain a submarine cable between Bermuda and Jamaica. The service maintained by the company now linked Bermuda with both Jamaica in the south and Halifax to the north. The extension of the cable system meant that Jamaica and other parts of the British Empire connected to it would no longer rely on foreign telegraphic systems.

The company eventually ran direct cables from Halifax to Bermuda, Turks Islands, and Jamaica and had cable connections with the West Indies, United States, Canada, Cuba, Mexico, Central and South America, and Great Britain. The first cable was landed at Grand Turk Island in 1898 by the Halifax and Bermuda Cable Company, which later became known as the Direct West India Cable Company Ltd. Established to take over an agreement from August 2, 1897, the Direct West India Cable Company Ltd. was tasked with laying and managing a submarine cable line from Bermuda to Jamaica, passing through Turks Island. The project, originally agreed upon by Queen Victoria's government and The Halifax and Bermudas Cable Company Ltd., was subsidized by an £8,000 annual payment for twenty years.

In Halifax, The Halifax & Bermudas Cable Company was headquartered in the Dennis Building and integrated into the Canadian Pacific Railway's telegraph network during the early 1900s. This location facilitated communication across Canada, with a dedicated landline which linked it directly to Bamfield, Vancouver, the Pacific Cable Station for Australia and New Zealand, and also connected to the cable reaching the West Indies via Bermuda. All managed through the Dennis Building's infrastructure. The City of Halifax was connected to Bermuda and the West Indies by The Halifax and Bermuda Co. and was connected by cable to England and New York through the Direct United States Cable Co.

=== Formation of Cable & Wireless ===
The Halifax and Bermudas Cable Company merged with other companies to form Cable & Wireless.
