= Walter D. O'Hearn =

Canadian journalist

Walter Donald Anthony O'Hearn (1910–1969) was a prominent Canadian journalist in the mid-20th century. A versatile writer and editor, he wrote book reviews for The New York Times, did analytical reporting from the United Nations and produced whimsical pieces about two denizens of Montreal's Point St. Charles – Mrs. Harrigan and Mrs. Mulcahy – discussing the vital issues of the day, which were published in the Montreal Star and later issued in book form.

O'Hearn was born in Halifax, Nova Scotia and began his career in 1929 as a reporter for the Halifax Herald. He went to Montreal in 1932 and joined the Montreal Herald as an assistant editor. He became managing editor two years later and held this post until 1940.

O'Hearn joined the Royal Canadian Navy in 1941, and a year after his discharge in 1945 was sent to New York as resident correspondent of the Montreal Star. He was a founding member and first president of the United Nations Correspondents Association. While at the United Nations, O'Hearn co-wrote two books – published by the Canadian Institute for International Affairs in cooperation with the Carnegie Foundation – "United Nations' Struggle for Peace" and "Canada Stands Up."

On returning to Montreal in 1953, O'Hearn became literary and drama editor of the Montreal Star and in 1958 was made managing editor. In 1964 he was made executive editor and later a director of the company. Selections of O'Hearn's weekly column were published in two books – "Lady Chatterley, Latterly" and "The Member From Pasquobit".

O'Hearn was in wide demand as a speaker, particularly because of his insight and understanding of what he considered one of the most important stories in North America — the rise of French nationalism in Quebec. He served four terms as director of The Canadian Press, was an officer of the Corporation des Quotidiens du Québec (Quebec Dailies, Inc.), and a member of the Montreal arts council.

With his first wife, the former Mary McGrath, O'Hearn had a son, Walter Jr., a lawyer in New York, and three daughters, Eileen, Catherine and Julia. With his second wife, the former Dorothy Fletcher, he had two sons, Michael (deceased) and Peter, known as Yeshe Gyamtso, a respected translator of Tibetan texts.

O'Hearn died in August 1969.
