= Owen McCarron =

Canadian cartoonist and publisher

- Born: 1929 Halifax, Nova Scotia, Canada
- Died: June 27, 2005
- Area: Cartoonist
- Joe Shuster Awards Hall of Fame

Owen McCarron (1929 in Halifax, Nova Scotia – June 27, 2005) was a Canadian comics artist and publisher.

As a publisher, he was a prolific packager of promotional comic books. He also produced work for American comic book publishers, including Charlton Comics, DC Comics and Marvel. He also created Louie the Lightning Bug for the Alabama Power Company in 1983.

== Career ==
For thirty-two years McCarron worked for the Hallifax Herald Limited, publishers of The Chronicle-Herald and The Mail Star, which are distributed throughout the province of Nova Scotia. His "Fun and Games" puzzles entertained and delighted readers for over thirty-two years. McCarron pitched the same concept behind his original puzzles to his friend Marvel Comics publisher Stan Lee, who quickly approved the long-running strip, Marvel Fun And Games, and gave puzzlemaster McCarron free rein on the comic book series of the same name. He also self-published many comic books at his own expense, most were giveaways intended to entertain children during the 1960s and 1970s. McCarron was very easy-going, family-oriented, friendly, and was always ready to share his jokes and good-natured sense of humour. One of his relatives is the NHL hockey star, Sidney Crosby.

Despite living in Nova Scotia, McCarron managed to establish himself in the American comics scene. He drew, inked and coloured many war and western-themed stories for Charlton Comics, and later working for DC, before settling at Marvel Comics working on Ghost Rider, Spidey Super Stories, and other titles, including Marvel Fun and Games.

McCarron's reputation for speed and reliability made him one of Stan Lee’s go-to men for emergency work. In the early 1960s he had the opportunity to do a cover (never published) for a new Marvel comic called Spider-Man. That alternate take on the cover to The Amazing Spider-Man #10 remains with McCarron's family to this day.

Owen McCarron died in 2005. A productive storyteller and historian, McCarron was spotted just days before his death at his local library, hard at work on his next project. On December 6, 2017, twelve years after his death, the Halifax Herald published a cartoon he had drawn in anticipation of the 100th anniversary of the Halifax Explosion.

== Awards ==
The walls of McCarron's home were festooned with countless gifts he'd received of signed original artwork, including some by Charles Schulz, Alex Raymond, and many others. There were also signed letters from President Ronald and Nancy Reagan as well as Bill Clinton, thanking Owen McCarron for his lifetime of comic art.

Among his numerous honours was a Nova Scotia Environment Award for advancing environmental concerns through perspective written stories from his various characters. In 2006, the year after his death, he was inducted into the Joe Shuster Award's Canadian Comic Book Creator Hall of Fame, which celebrates that achievements of landmark Canadian comics artists such as McCarron.

== Death ==
McCarron died June 27, 2005, and was survived by his wife, Dorothy, four sons and a stepdaughter.
