= Skinner baronets =

Baronetcy in the Baronetage of the United Kingdom

The Skinner baronetcy, of Pont Street in the Borough of Chelsea, is a title in the Baronetage of the United Kingdom. It was created on 9 February 1912 for Thomas Skinner. He was the founder of Thomas Skinner & Co, publishers, and a Director of the Canadian Pacific Railway, of the Hudson's Bay Company and of the Bank of Montreal. The 2nd Baronet was President of Thomas Skinner & Co.

== Skinner baronets, of Pont Street (1912) ==
- Sir Thomas Skinner, 1st Baronet (1840–1926)
- Sir (Thomas) Hewitt Skinner, 2nd Baronet (1875–1968)
- Sir (Thomas) Gordon Skinner, 3rd Baronet (1899–1972)
- Sir (Thomas) Keith Hewitt Skinner, 4th Baronet (1927–2021)
- Sir (Thomas) James Hewitt Skinner, 5th Baronet (born 1962)

The heir presumptive is the current holder's brother, Ian Ivor Hewitt Skinner (born 1964).

== Notes ==
Baronetage of the United Kingdom
Preceded by Ralli baronets	Skinner baronets of Pont Street; 9 February 1912	Succeeded by Phillips baronets
