= William Dennis =

Canadian politician

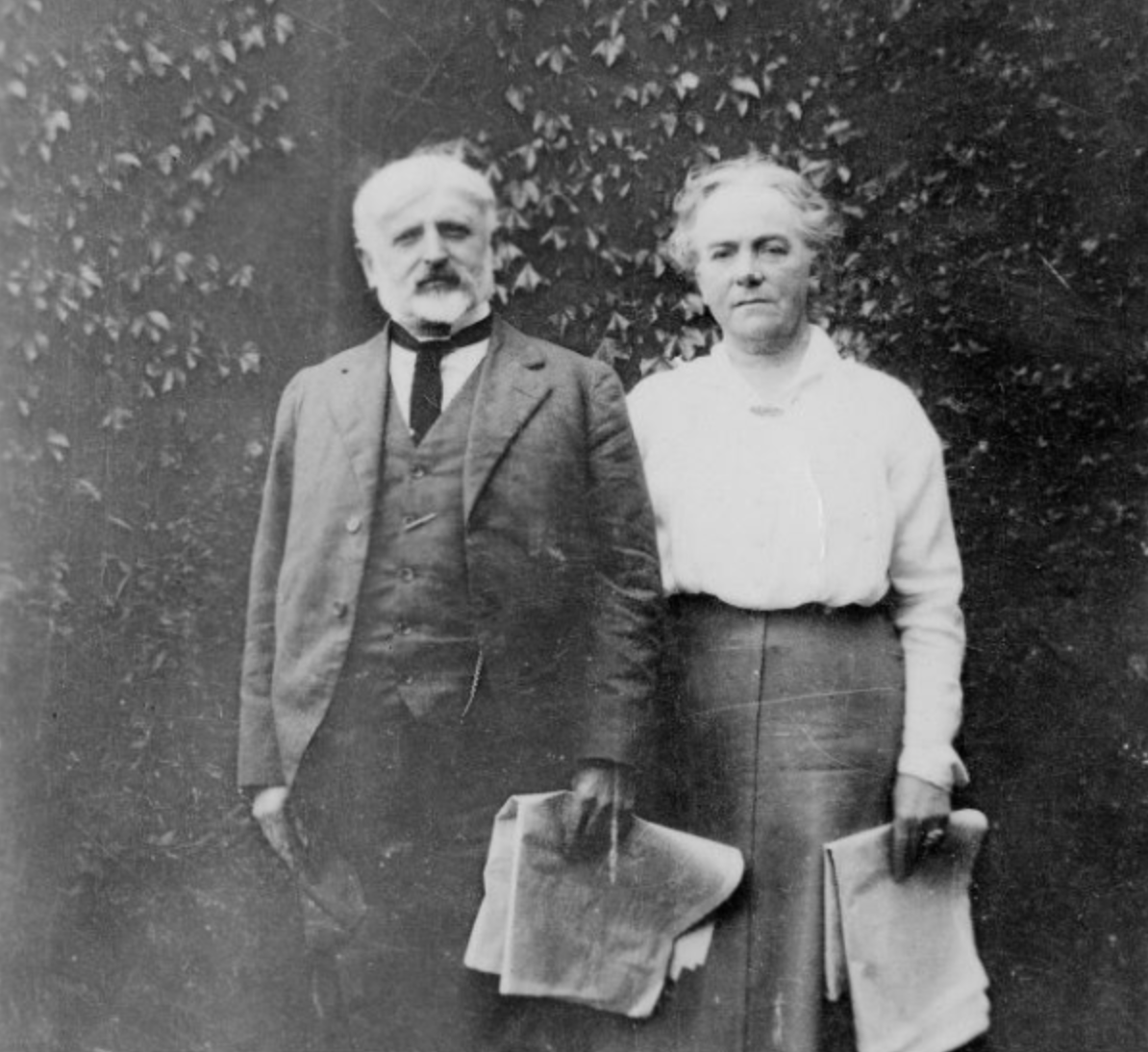
- William and Agnes (Miller) Dennis

Member of the Senate of Canada for Halifax, Nova Scotia division
- In office 20 November 1912 – 11 July 1920

Personal details
- Born: 4 March 1856 Cornwall, England, UK
- Died: 11 July 1920 (aged 64) Boston, Massachusetts, USA
- Party: Independent Conservative
- Spouse: Agnes Miller
- Profession: editor, journalist, publisher

William Dennis (4 March 1856 – 11 July 1920) was an Independent Conservative member of the Senate of Canada. He was born in the English county of Cornwall and became an editor, journalist and publisher.

== Biography ==
=== Introduction ===
William Dennis (4 March 1856 – 11 July 1920) was an Independent Conservative member of the Senate of Canada. He was also the owner and president of a publishing company, and editor-in-chief of two newspapers, the Halifax Herald and the Evening Mail. He survived many hardships and tragedies including the loss of six of his younger siblings and five of his children, two major fires at his publishing company and the Halifax Explosion. Through it all, he dedicated himself to his work, raising money through his newspapers to help the wives, widows and children of soldiers of the South African Wars (1879–1915) and victims of the Indian famine of 1899–1900, and the famine in Japan. When he was a senator, he traveled to England and France to personally report on the progress of World War I and Canada's role in it. He was presented to the Queen of England. While in the Senate he also championed the needs of lobster fishermen and advanced other issues for Nova Scotia.

William Dennis's son Alexander described his father as "a character full of initiative, energy and enthusiasm that had so many facets. He hated dishonesty and his eyes that generally carried a twinkle seemed to penetrate in steely contrast to the untruth. Some likened him unto a typical English squire. This severeness was more than balanced by his generous spirit. He was neither a physical nor moral coward and seemed to have a total disregard for self. His pen courageously attacked what he believed to be wrong and not in the interests of the people, and his campaigns of publicity were carried out with thoroughness in the interests of his province and country."

=== Summary of William's career ===
- 1874–75 Delivery boy for a butcher.
- 1875–76 Reporter for the Morning Herald.
- 1876–77 Employed by the Order of Good Templars.
- 1877–78 Secretary General for the Order of Good Templars.
- 1878–1920 Journalist and Publisher of the Evening Mail, initially a four-page weekly.
- 1879–81 Reporter for the Morning Herald.
- 1881–83 Editor, Winnipeg Sun
- 1883–85 City Editor, Morning Herald
- 1886–87 Reporter, Morning Herald
- 1887–90 News Editor, Morning Herald and Member of the School Board.
- 1890 Gained half-ownership of the Morning Herald and sole responsibility for its management.
- 1890–95 News Editor Morning Herald,(which was changed to Halifax Herald in 1892). Alderman and Justice of the Peace as well as a Member of the School Board.
- 1895–96 Journalist, Alderman and Justice of the Peace
- 1896–98 Managing Director, Halifax Herald
- 1898-01 Managing Director, Herald Printing and Publishing Co.
- 1901–1920 President and Editor-in-Chief of the Halifax Herald and the Evening Mail
- 1912–1920 Senator

=== Early life ===
William was born on 4 Mar 1856 in Flanders, St. Gennys, Cornwall. His Presbyterian parents, John Dennis and Mary Parnall, ran a large farm that employed agricultural laborers. He was educated at home, together with 14 younger siblings that included Thomas, Henry, John, Mary, John (Albert), Louisa, two Georges, Bessie, Maude, Jesse, Fritz and Lily. Entrepreneurship was encouraged in his family. He brother Thomas went to Germany to be educated by Frederick Krupp. William asked Rev. Dr. Clay if there were jobs for young boys in Canada, and learning that there were, he and his family decided immigrate. They came to Canada around 1873, settling in Middle Stewiacke, Nova Scotia.

William's family knew hardship. Three of his siblings died by 1875. William's first job was a delivery boy for a butcher. Although the pay was low, it allowed him to meet his future wife Agnes Miller.

An impassioned champion for his beliefs, William became involved with the Order of the Good Templars, enthusiastically helping to found new lodges in order to spread the temperance movement. The order employed him and he soon rose to be the grand secretary, earning a princely sum of $500 per year. It was working for the order that William met J. J. Stewart, and others who were interested in establishing an "unfettered" public press. William began working as a reporter in 1875. He founded the Evening Mail, a four-page newspaper three years later.

In 1878, when William had been working as a reporter for Halifax Herald for three years, he married Agnes Miller. They had eleven children: Helen, Jean, Clarissa, Eleonor, Agnes, Margaret, William, Sarah, John, Eric and William (Alexandera). Four of their children did not survive to adulthood, and a fifth was lost to Tuberculosis in 1914. William and Agnes purchased a home with acreage at 45 Coburg Road in Halifax for $5,300.

=== The Halifax Herald and the City of Halifax ===
In 1890, J. J. Stewart offered William a half interest in the Herald as well as sole responsibility for its management. William purchased the Kenny Building on the corner of Granville and George Streets which he converted into offices, keeping two floors for the use of the paper. In addition to being the managing director of the Morning Herald, he was serving on the school board. In 1892, William changed the name of the Morning Herald to the Halifax Herald. From 1892 to 1892, he was an alderman and justice of the peace for the City of Halifax, while maintaining leadership of the paper.

=== World War I, two fires and the Halifax Explosion ===
Tragedy struck again with the death of William's sister Bessie in 1904, his business partner J. J. Stewart in 1907, and his sister Louisa in 1908. Stewart left William the remaining shares of the Halifax Herald. By this time, the family was growing again. The first grandchild, Marion, was born in 1906. Within eight years there were five.

A fire gutted the building of the Halifax Herald and the Evening Mail on 12 January 1912. William borrowed money and leased the Morning Chronicle equipment after that paper had gone to press, until new equipment could be shipped and assembled in the old Clayton Building. In April, they moved again into a building on Argyle Street.

William was appointed to the Senate for the Halifax, Nova Scotia division on 20 November 1912 following nomination by Prime Minister Robert Borden. When at home in Ottawa, he could often be found preparing directives and articles for his newspapers. In addition, for many years, he was the Nova Scotia correspondent for one of the dailies in London, England.

During the first World War, an Empire Parliamentary Association delegation was formed to view conditions overseas. William traveled with several other Canadian delegates, his wife, and his son Alexander to England. The Dominion of Canada representatives were presented to Queen Elizabeth II on 7 July 1916 by Hon. James Lowther, Speaker of the House of Commons and Joint President of the Empire Parliamentary Association, United Kingdom Branch. Next, they went to France, where they were taken to the trenches. There, William met his son Eric. They returned to England and there they witnessed the first Zeppelin brought down in flames over London. Eric died seven months later in the Battle of Vimy Ridge on Easter Sunday, 1917, bringing the number of children William and Agnes had lost to five.

On 6 December 1917, the Halifax Herald building was severely damaged by the Halifax Explosion. In addition to the shattering of every window, there was internal damage to the equipment and rooms. A few staff remained to board up the windows and produce a paper by hand. On 9 February 1920, fire raged again through the building, destroying the third floor and severely damaging the fourth floor. The first floor was flooded with water, destroying the rolls of newsprint. William was undaunted and rebuilt the business again.

Understanding hard times, William donated "large amounts to philanthropic and public relief". Through the newspapers, William coordinated collections such as The Patriotic Fund (for the widows, wives, and children of men who fought in the South African Wars, the Indian famine of 1899–1900 Fund, the Soldier South African Monument Fund, and The Japanese Famine Fund. He received thanks from the government of Japan, the Bishop of Calcutta, and the viceroy of India, among others.

William remained a senator and editor-in-chief of the Herald and Mail Publishing Company until his death on 11 July 1920.

=== Other historical figures ===
William's wife Agnes was instrumental in establishing the Victoria Order of Nurses to provide home-based care to those in need.

His daughter Clara produced a series of travel books on Nova Scotia illustrated with her own photographs in the 1930s. Many of her photographs can be seen in a collection, Clara Dennis Tours Nova Scotia at the Nova Scotia Archives.

His nephew William Henry Dennis also served in the Canadian senate.
