= William Henry Dennis =

Canadian politician

The Honourable William Henry Dennis
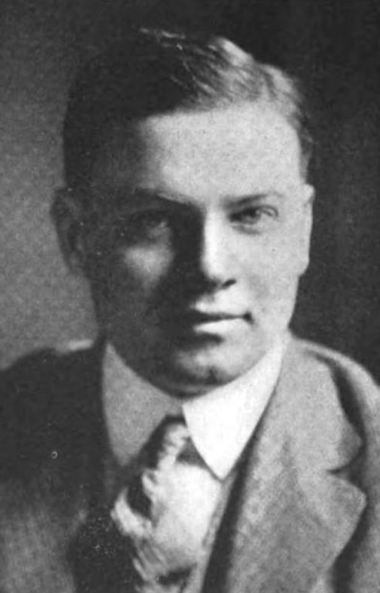

Member of the Senate of Canada for Halifax, Nova Scotia division
- In office 3 February 1932 – 18 January 1954

Personal details
- Born: William Henry Dennis; 31 March 1887 Colchester County, Nova Scotia, Canada
- Died: 18 January 1954 (aged 66) Ottawa, Ontario, Canada
- Party: Conservative; Progressive Conservative
- Spouse: Hilda Wood
- Profession: printer, publisher

William Henry Dennis (31 March 1887 – 18 January 1954) was a Conservative and Progressive Conservative party member of the Senate of Canada. He was born in Colchester County, Nova Scotia and became a printer and publisher.

== Life ==
The son of Henry Parnell Dennis, he was educated in Colchester County and entered work as an apprentice printer in Halifax. Dennis married Hilda Wood in 1914. He became publisher of the Halifax Herald in 1920 after the death of William Dennis. Dennis was also a director for the Nova Scotia Trust Company.

He was appointed to the Senate for the Halifax, Nova Scotia division on 3 February 1932 nomination by Prime Minister R. B. Bennett. Dennis remained in that role until his death on 18 January 1954.
