= Ritz-Carlton Montreal =

Hotel in Montreal, Quebec

Ritz-Carlton Montréal

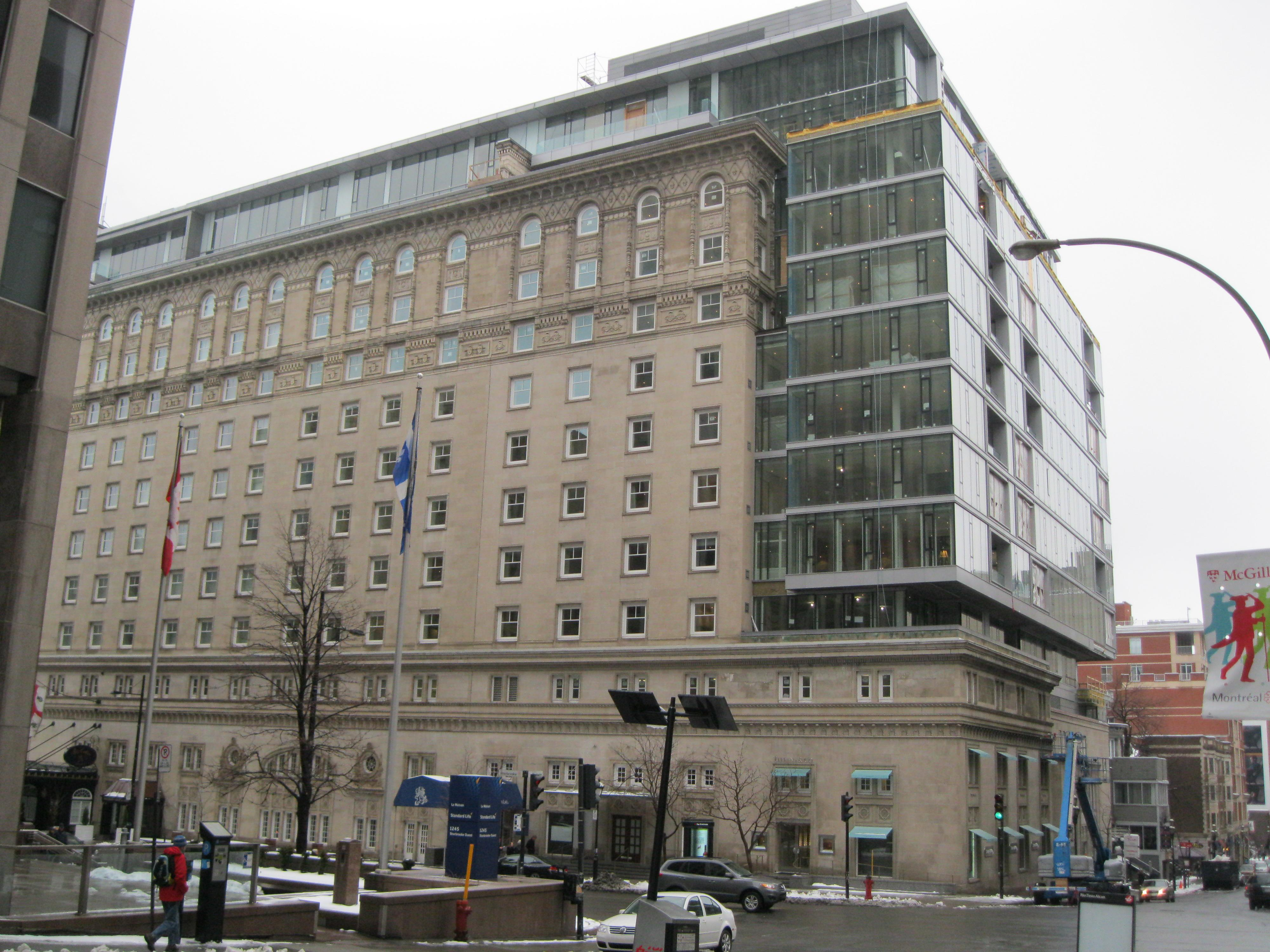
- The Ritz-Carlton Montréal in 2023

- Location within Montreal

General information
- Location: 1228, rue Sherbrooke Ouest; Montreal, Quebec; H3G 1H6
- Coordinates: 45°30′0″N 73°34′40.8″W
- Opened: 31 December 1912
- Cost: C$2 million

Technical details
- Floor area: 11

Design and construction
- Architect: Warren and Wetmore

Other information
- Number of rooms: 96
- Number of suites: 33
- Number of restaurants: 1
- Number of bars: 1
- Parking: Yes

Website
- www.ritzmontreal.com

The Ritz-Carlton Montréal is a luxury hotel located at 1228 Sherbrooke Street West, on the corner of Drummond Street, in Montreal, Quebec. Opened in 1912, it was the second Ritz-Carlton hotel in North America after one in New York City. Its name was originally licensed by César Ritz directly, and while the hotel is now part of the chain managed by the Ritz-Carlton Hotel Company, it retains its original branding stylization.

The original builders referred to themselves as the Carlton Hotel Company of Montreal, with the concept of naming the hotel after London's celebrated Carlton Hotel. However, one of the investors, Charles Hosmer, was a personal friend of César Ritz, and persuaded his colleagues to incorporate the Ritz name associated with the success of the Hôtel Ritz Paris, which opened in 1898.

For a fee of C$25,000, César Ritz agreed to lend his name, but stipulated that by the "Ritz standards," every room was to have its own bathroom, there was to be a kitchen on every floor so room-service meals could be served course by course, and around-the-clock valet and concierge service were to be made available to the guests for, amongst other duties, tracking lost luggage or ordering theatre tickets. Finally, the lobby was to be small and intimate, with a curved grand staircase for ladies to show off their ball gowns on their descent.

== Early years ==
Around 1820, John Bigsby observed that Montreal's hotels were "as remarkable for their palatial exteriors as they are for their excellent accommodation within." Donegana's Hotel became the largest in the British Colonies in the 1840s, and the Windsor had been Montreal's preeminent hotel in the 1870s.

By 1909, some of the city's wealthiest citizens wanted a modern "first class residential hotel". The citizens, led by Charles Hosmer (a personal friend of César Ritz), Sir Herbert Holt, Sir Montagu Allan, and Sir Charles Gordon, met with the Hon. Lionel Guest (a first cousin of Winston Churchill) and Harry Higgins (Chairman of the Ritz Hotel London) to found the Carlton Hotel Company of Montreal. The land on which the hotel was built was purchased from Charles Meredith, who became the fifth principal shareholder. The hotel was designed by the architectural firm Warren and Wetmore, and it was completed at a cost of C$2 million. Its doors officially opened at 11:15 pm on New Year's Eve, 1912, marked by a gala ball attended by 350 guests.

On Valentine's Day, 1916, the first Canadian transcontinental telephone call was made from the hotel. An audience of two hundred businessmen was said to have listened as the Chairman of the Bell Telephone Company enquired: "Hello. Is this Vancouver?" The clear reply—"Yes"—was met with approval and toasted with champagne.

In 1918, Lord Birkenhead described the hotel as "very luxurious and comfortable," and the American Bankers Association held its annual meetings there. In 1919, the Prince of Wales made the first royal visit, staying in the seventeen-room Royal Suite. Queen Marie of Romania, Prince Felix of Luxembourg and Prince George, Duke of Kent also stayed at the hotel in the 1920s. Several movie idols stayed, such as Lillie Langtry, Mary Pickford, and Douglas Fairbanks. Former US President William Howard Taft and his wife "entertained lavishly" in the Presidential Suite for all of 1921.

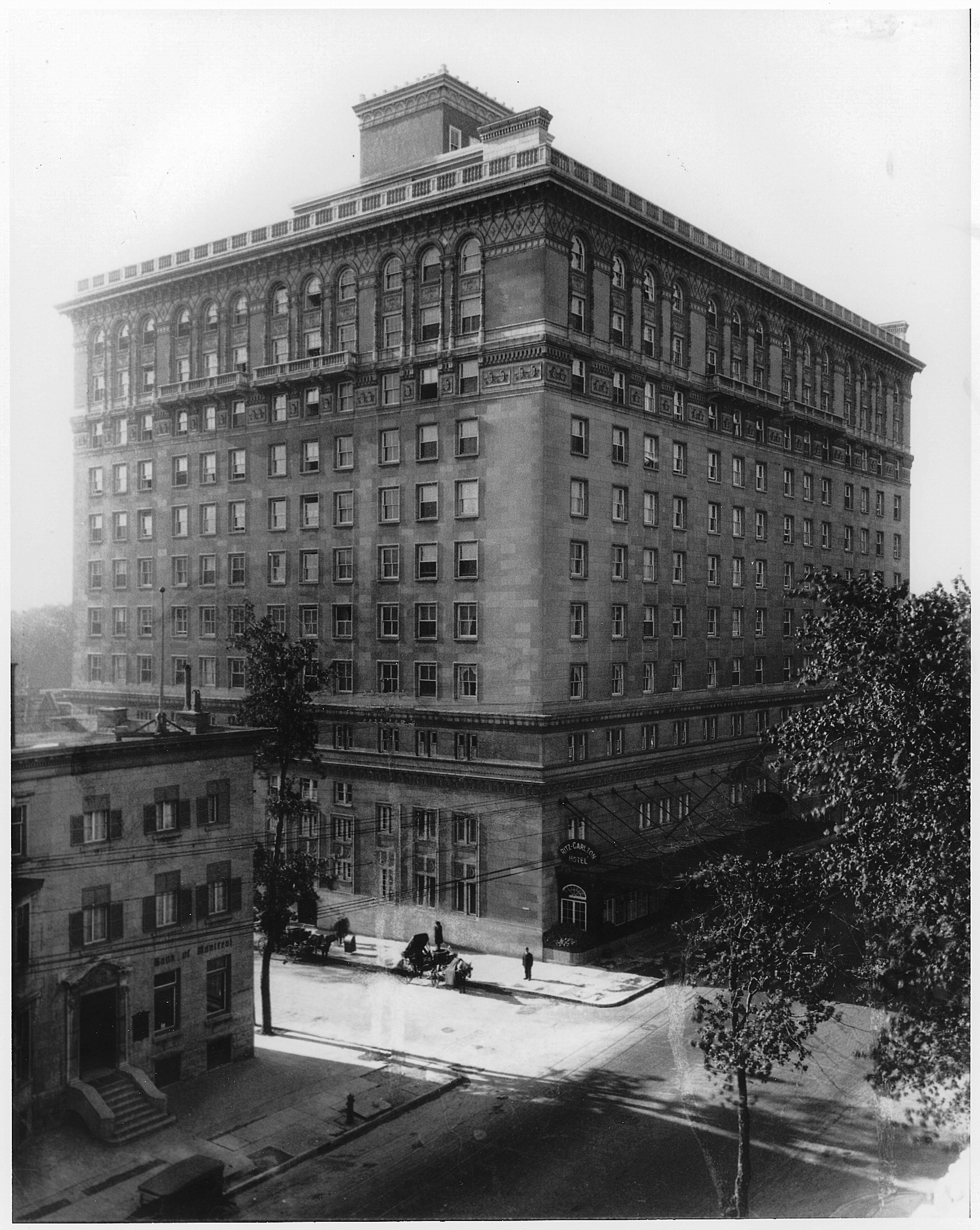
Ritz-Carlton Montreal taken in 1924 by William Notman & Son Ltd.

As the founders had hoped, two-thirds of the guests at the Ritz-Carlton took suites comprising several rooms and lived there permanently for $29 a month. The First World War made standards difficult to keep, and in 1922, in direct rivalry to the Ritz-Carlton, the Mount Royal Hotel, was erected as the largest hotel in the British Empire. The Ritz-Carlton and the Mount Royal Club were later known as the Golden Square Mile.

== Depression ==
The Wall Street crash of 1929 was followed by the Great Depression and then World War II. The Swiss General Manager, Émile Charles des Baillets, had been with the hotel since 1924. In 1929, he lamented that before, guests had come to stay for several weeks accompanied by trains of luggage, but during this time, when they did come, they came for a night or two with only a single bag.

Many of its in-house residents were not as badly affected as their American counterparts following 1929; they stayed loyal to the hotel. In the 1930s, when the widows and residents of the Golden Square Mile began to downsize from their mansions, many prominent people took rooms in the hotel, such as Lady Shaughnessy and founder Charles Hosmer's son, Elwood, who, between him and his sister, had inherited $20 million from their father in 1927. The hotel had guests such as Winston Churchill, Charles de Gaulle, Marlene Dietrich, Liberace, Tyrone Power and Maurice Chevalier. However, as the last of the loyal Square Milers were dying off, the hotel began to fall into debt.

Wartime shortages made it difficult to maintain the graceful living standards set by the original founders. The General Manager, des Baillets, was succeeded by Albert Frossard in 1940, another native of Switzerland. Unhappily, and not without a fight, Frossard had to bow to the directors' commands to relax the custom of formal dress, of either white tie or black tie, to suits in order to allow more people to dine at the hotel. Nonetheless, the change led to the hotel's larger profits.

== Post-war ==
In 1947, the hotel was sold to François Dupré, who formed a new board of directors and named himself president. Already the owner of two prestigious hotels in Paris—Hotel George V, Paris and the Plaza Athénée—Dupré brought with him some of the flair of César Ritz. He opened Le Bar Maritime in 1948 and in the early 1950s, added the Ritz Garden, where patrons could dine around a flower-fringed pond, which was home to twenty-four ducklings.

In 1957, a new wing consisting of sixty-seven rooms and suites was added, and care was taken to maintain the original Ritz-influenced Louis XVI and Carlton-influenced Regency styles and ambiance. When the renovation was complete, Howard Hughes was the first person to check in, booking out over half of the eighth floor. Between 1959 and 1969, the image of the hotel was more like that of a gentlemen's club. It catered to Montreal's old money. However, it was publicly known for the first scandalous wedding of Elizabeth Taylor to Richard Burton that took place in the Royal Suite in 1964, as the only minister who would privately marry them had his church across the street.

== Modern times ==
By 1970, it was updated to a site of historical importance, combined with modern styles, luxury and services. In 1971, Richard Nixon stayed there, and in 1972, The Rolling Stones booked out the entire sixth floor, but were refused service in the main dining room for not being suitably attired; they later returned in jackets. In 1976, the hotel received two famous guests, Queen Elizabeth II and Prince Philip, as well as the most renowned award for a hotel: the AAA Five Diamond distinction.

In 1977, champagne corks were popped at the Oval Room party, at which 600 guests bade farewell to esteemed General Manager Fred Laubi while welcoming his successor. At the age of 36, Fernand Roberge was appointed the first French-Canadian general manager of the hotel. Under his command, terrycloth bathrobes, French toiletries, bathroom scales, and large umbrellas were placed in every room. By 1979, the lobby and reception areas were enlarged and 100 rooms and suites had been redecorated. In 1984, Brian Mulroney was using the hotel regularly, and Pierre Elliott Trudeau became a regular after having taken up residence at his nearby art deco mansion, Maison Cormier, in the same year.

In 1988, the year of its 75th anniversary, the Ritz-Carlton Montreal welcomed the Queen Mother. The same year, in order to celebrate the Dames and Messieurs of the Ritz-Carlton, all the employees and their spouses were invited to dine at the Café de Paris. The Ritz-Carlton also makes a feature in the 1996 film, Matilda. Other leading figures of the 20th century that stayed at the Ritz-Carlton Montreal include Charles de Gaulle, George H. W. Bush, and Céline Dion. Israeli Prime Minister Benjamin Netanyahu took refuge there during the 2002 Concordia University Netanyahu riot.

The Ritz-Carlton Montreal closed in 2008 for renovation and reopened after a $200 million restoration. Today, the hotel is part of The Ritz-Carlton Hotel Company, LLC., owned by Marriott International. Unlike other Ritz-Carlton hotels, the hotel is still using a lion emblem.

=== Rooms and suites ===
The hotel has 96 rooms and 33 suites, including the Royal Suite, which consists of 4,700 square feet and 3 bedrooms. When the hotel completed its renovations in 2012, the Royal Suite was the largest hotel room in Canada, renting for $7,000 to $10,000 per night.

=== Restaurants ===
Since 2012, the hotel's main restaurant is Maison Boulud, named for the celebrity chef Daniel Boulud. The hotel also offers afternoon tea in the refurbished Palm Court.

=== Pool and spa ===
The rooftop is equipped with a saltwater infinity pool.

In 2015, the hotel added a spa for the first time, as the Spa St. James moved into the hotel from its prior location in a historic building on Crescent Street.
