= H. Montagu Allan =

Canadian businessman and philanthropist (1860–1951)

Lieutenant-Colonel Sir H. Montagu Allan CVO
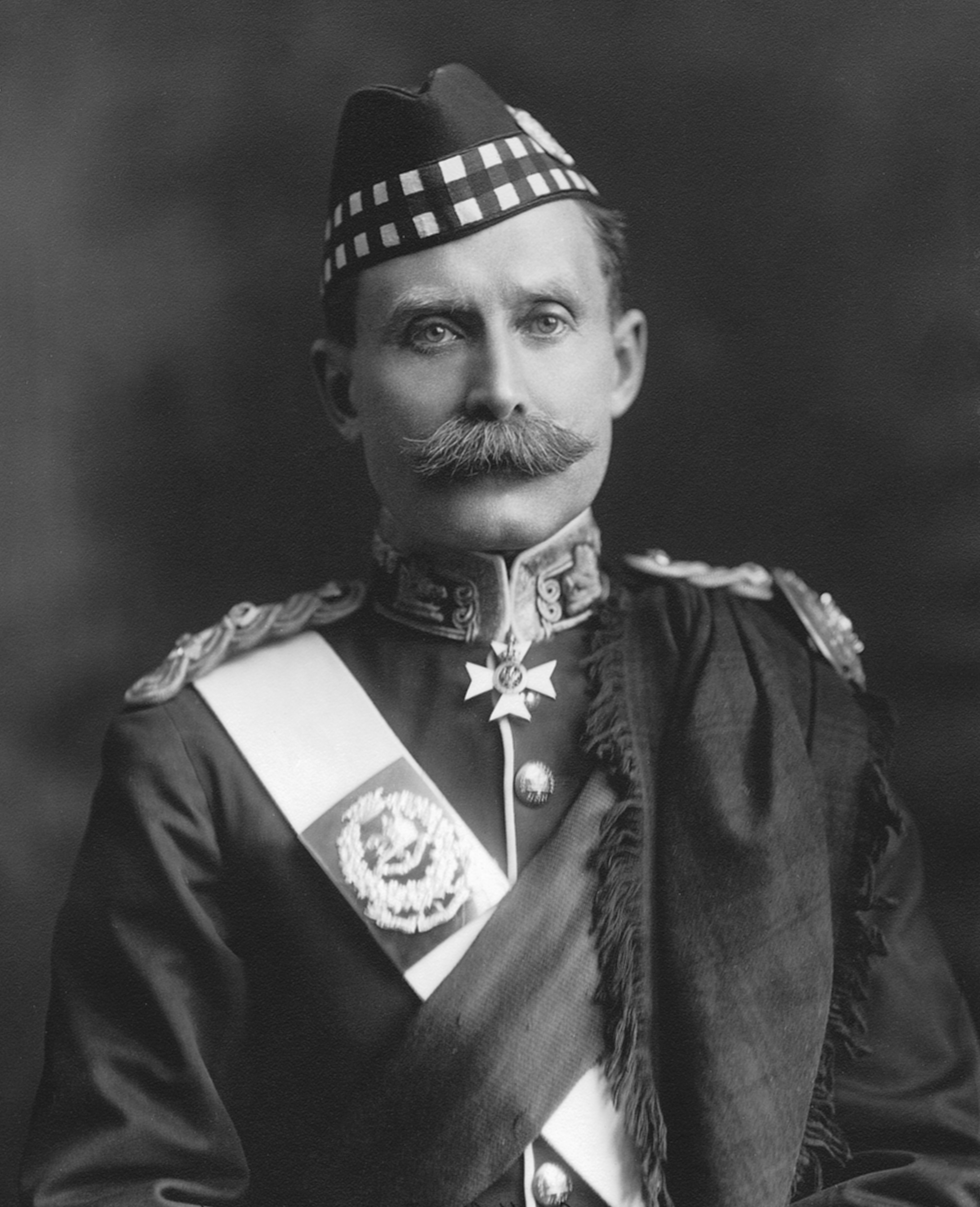
- Allan in 1912
- Born: Hugh Andrew Montagu Allan; October 13, 1860; Montreal, Canada East
- Died: September 26, 1951 (aged 90); Montreal, Quebec, Canada
- Resting place: Mount Royal Cemetery
- Occupations: Businessman and philanthropist
- Known for: Donating the Allan Cup, the championship trophy of men's amateur hockey in Canada
- Spouse: Marguerite Ethel Mackenzie (m. 1893)
- Children: 4, including Martha Allan

Lieutenant-Colonel Sir Hugh Andrew Montagu Allan CVO (October 13, 1860 – September 26, 1951) was a Canadian businessman and philanthropist. He was the principal heir of his father, Sir Hugh Allan, and became deputy chairman of the family-owned Allan Steamship Line. He was president of several major Canadian financial institutions and of the Montreal General Hospital. He co-founded and was president of the Ritz-Carlton Hotel in Montreal. In 1940, he and his wife donated their Montreal home, Ravenscrag, to the McGill University Faculty of Medicine, and it became known as the Allan Memorial Institute. He is best remembered as a sportsman who donated the Allan Cup, a trophy that is still awarded today to the Canadian men's amateur ice hockey champions.

== Early life ==
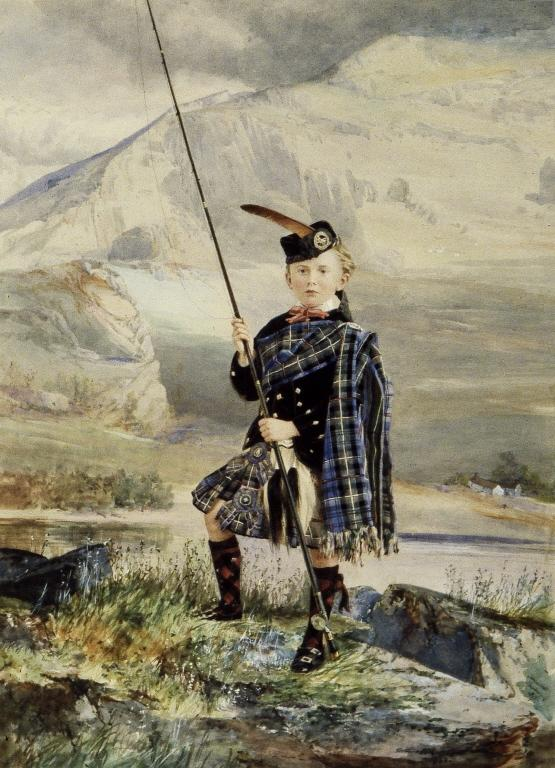
Portrait in 1867 by William Notman

Born in Montreal's Golden Square Mile, he was the second son of Sir Hugh Allan of Ravenscrag and his wife, Matilda Caroline Smith (1828–1881), daughter of John Smith (d. 1872) of Athelstane Hall, Montreal, and his wife Betsy Rae. From 1878, he was known as H. Montagu Allan to avoid confusion with his cousin Hugh Andrew Allan (1857–1938). He studied at Bishop's College School in Lennoxville, Quebec, then in Paris, before joining the family's shipping business, the Allan Line.

== Business career ==
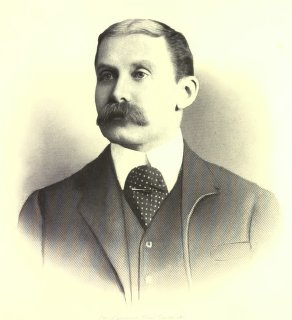
Allan in 1904

Allan rose to become deputy chairman of the Allan Line before retiring from the family business in 1912. By then, he was president of the Royal Securities Corporation, the Acadia Coal Company, the Canadian Rubber Company, the Canadian Paper Company, and the Ritz-Carlton Hotel, which he co-founded. He was a director and president of the Merchant's Bank of Canada (which had assets of $190 million in 1921) during its amalgamation into the Bank of Montreal in 1922. He also served as a Councillor and Treasurer of the Montreal Board of Trade.

He served on the board of directors of several major companies, including Canada Steamship Lines, Royal Trust Company, Montreal Light, Heat & Power, Montreal Rolling Mills, the Montreal Street Railway Company, the Ogilvie Flour Mills Company, the Montreal Investment Trust and the Guarantee Company of North America.

== Other interests ==
Allan was Chairman of the Bishop's College School Association, President of the Montreal General Hospital, President of the St. Andrew's Society of Montreal, vice-president of the Montreal Racquets Club, and he was one of the founders of the Mount Royal Club and the Winter Club. He was a leader in the Charity Organization Society and a director for the Society for the Prevention of Cruelty to Animals. Allan was honorary Lieutenant-Colonel of the 5th Regiment of The Black Watch (Royal Highland Regiment) of Canada. In 1915, he was appointed Lieutenant-Colonel of the Canadian Expeditionary Force and accompanied them to Europe, where he fought in World War I.

Allan was an avid sportsman and outdoor enthusiast, and a member of a number of sporting clubs. He had a special passion for horses and served as Master of the Montreal Hunt, President of the Canadian Racing Association, Director of the Royal International Horse Show in London, President of the Montreal Jockey Club and Chairman of the Montreal Horse Show Association. He owned a thoroughbred horse-racing stable, and his horses won several Queen's Plates, Montreal Hunt Cups, Members' Plates and the Hunters' Handicap Steeplechase Cup.

Allan was created a Knight Bachelor by King Edward VII of the United Kingdom in 1906, and the following year was made a Commander of the Royal Victorian Order. He held the Order of the Rising Sun of Japan (3rd Class), after entertaining Prince Fushimi Sadanaru at his Montreal home, Ravenscrag, where he also hosted Prince Arthur, Duke of Connaught and Strathearn and Prince Edward, the Prince of Wales (later King Edward VIII).

Among other clubs, Allan was a member of the St. James' Club, the Mount Royal Club, the Forest and Stream, The Toronto Club, the Rideau Club and the Manitoba Club. In New York City, he was a member of the Knickerbocker Club, and in London, he was a member of the Junior Carlton Club.

== The Allan Memorial Cup ==
The Allan Memorial Cup

When the Stanley Cup was restricted to competition between professional ice hockey clubs, amateur teams no longer had a championship to which they could aspire. Allan was a well-known ice hockey enthusiast, and in 1908, he donated the Allan Cup, a trophy that would represent the highest level of achievement for amateur hockey teams across Canada.

The Cup is awarded annually to the senior ice hockey champions of Canada. Like the Stanley Cup, the Allan Cup was originally a challenge trophy, meaning teams could issue challenges to the reigning champion, hoping to defeat them and earn the status of champion for themselves. In 1914, the Canadian Amateur Hockey Association (CAHA) was formed and the Allan Cup became its championship trophy under the control of trustees appointed by Allan himself. At the CAHA general meeting in March 1927, W. A. Fry requested to have the CAHA take control of the Allan Cup and its profits from the trustees, and use the funds to build amateur hockey in Canada. He felt the move justified as the CAHA had evolved and was able to manage its own affairs. His motion asked for H. Montagu Allan to donate the cup to the CAHA, and establish an Allan Cup committee which included trustee William Northey.

Beginning in 1920, when hockey was first introduced to the Olympic Games, the reigning Allan Cup champion was chosen to represent Canada. This continued until Father David Bauer introduced a National Hockey program that produced a team of selects at the Innsbruck 1964 Winter Olympics.

For his contribution to the sport of ice hockey, Allan was made a member of the Hockey Hall of Fame in 1945 in the Builders category. His cousin, Brenda (Allan), known as Lady Meredith (1867–1959), donated the Lady Meredith Cup in 1920, which was the first ice hockey trophy to be competed for amongst women in Canada.

== Marriage and children ==
On October 18, 1893, Allan married Marguerite Ethel Mackenzie (1873–1957), daughter of Hector MacKenzie (1843–1901) of Montreal and his wife Martha Alger, granddaughter of Cyrus Alger and Holmes Hinkley, both of Boston. Lady Allan's father was President of J.G. Mackenzie & Co. of Montreal, a director of the Hudson's Bay Company, vice-president of the Merchants Bank, vice-president of the Montreal Telegraph Company and President of the Montreal Philharmonic Society. Lady Allan was a niece of The Hon. Frederick Mackenzie and sister-in-law of Edward Ermatinger, of Montreal.

The Allans were the parents of four children, all of whom they outlived:

- (Marguerite) Martha Allan (1894–1942), died unmarried.
- Lt. Hugh Allan (1897-6 July 1917). Educated at Eton (where he was a prefect and elected a member of 'Pop') and McGill University. In 1915, he joined The Black Watch (Royal Highland Regiment) of Canada before transferring and becoming a flight sub-lieutenant with the Royal Naval Air Service. He was shot down on his first service flight over the English Channel, during World War I. He was unmarried.
- Anna Marjory Allan (18 November 1898 – 7 May 1915), killed on the RMS Lusitania.
- Gwendolyn Evelyn Allan (20 April 1900 – 7 May 1915), killed on the RMS Lusitania.

In May 1915, during World War I, Lady Allan, along with daughters Anna, 16, and Gwen, 15, were aboard the RMS Lusitania when it was sunk by German U-boat U-20. After she and her daughters jumped into the water, Lady Allan was severely injured. While she was rescued, both daughters drowned. Anna's body was never found, but Gwendolyn's was recovered the next day and returned to Montreal for burial. Rita Jolivet, the future wife of Sir Montagu's Scottish cousin, Jimmy Allan, was also a passenger on the Lusitania. Two years after this tragedy, the war claimed a third child, Hugh, who was killed in action, shot down over the English Channel in July 1917 while serving with the Royal Naval Air Service.

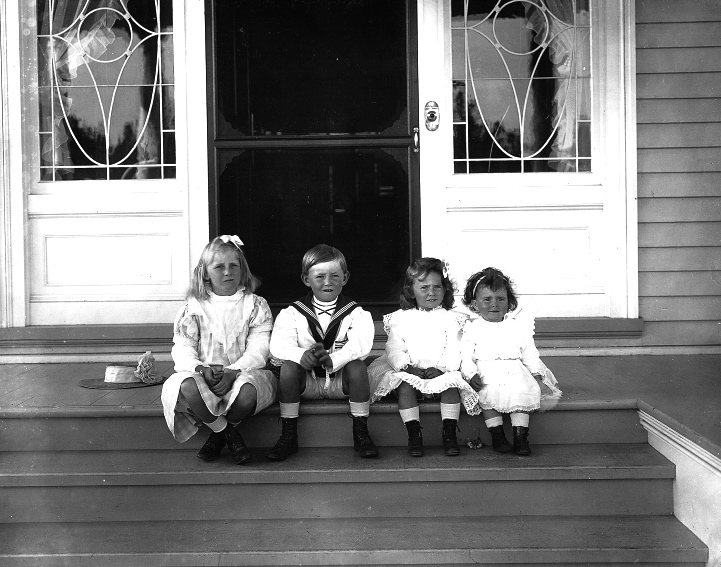
The Allan children at Cacouna, 1901

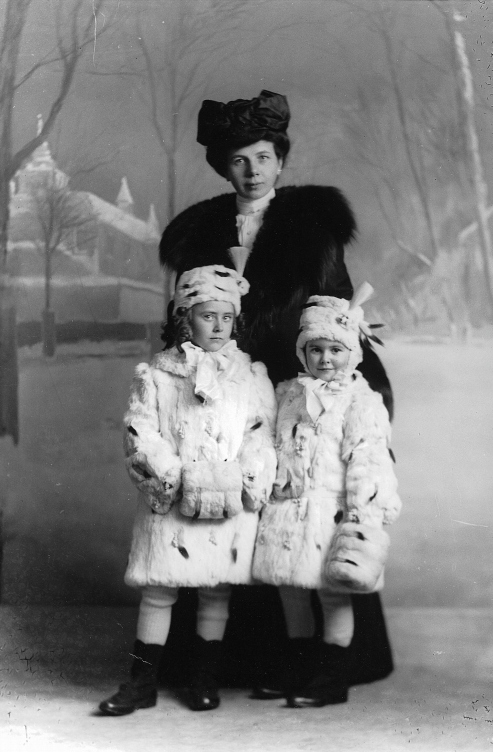
Lady Allan with her two youngest daughters, 1906

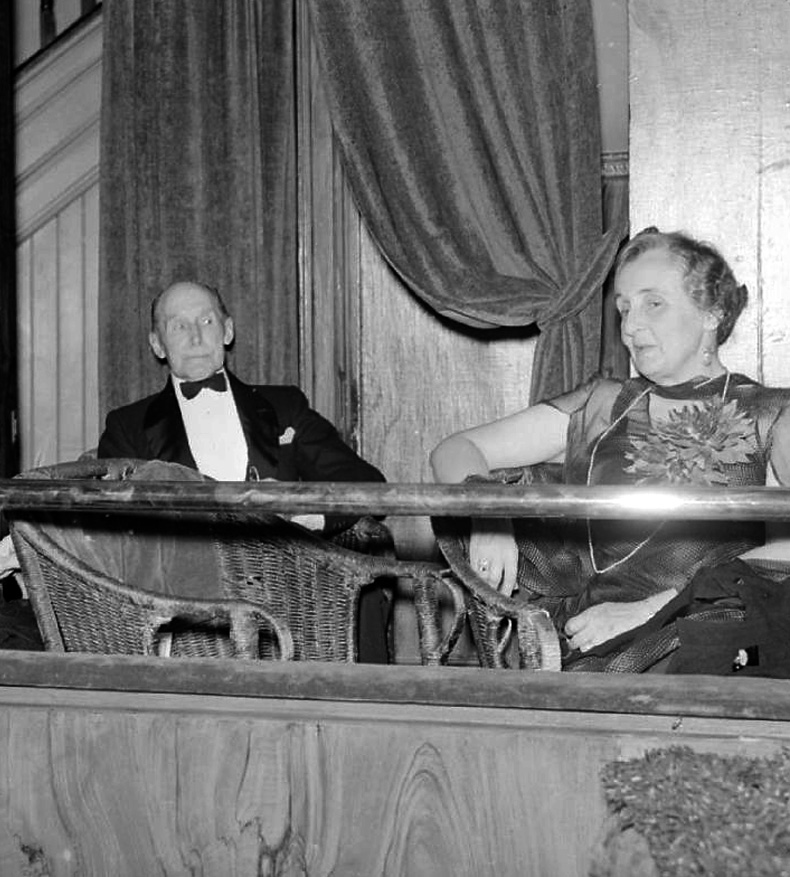
Sir Montagu and Lady Allan at the Guy Street theatre, Montreal, 1940

== Residences ==
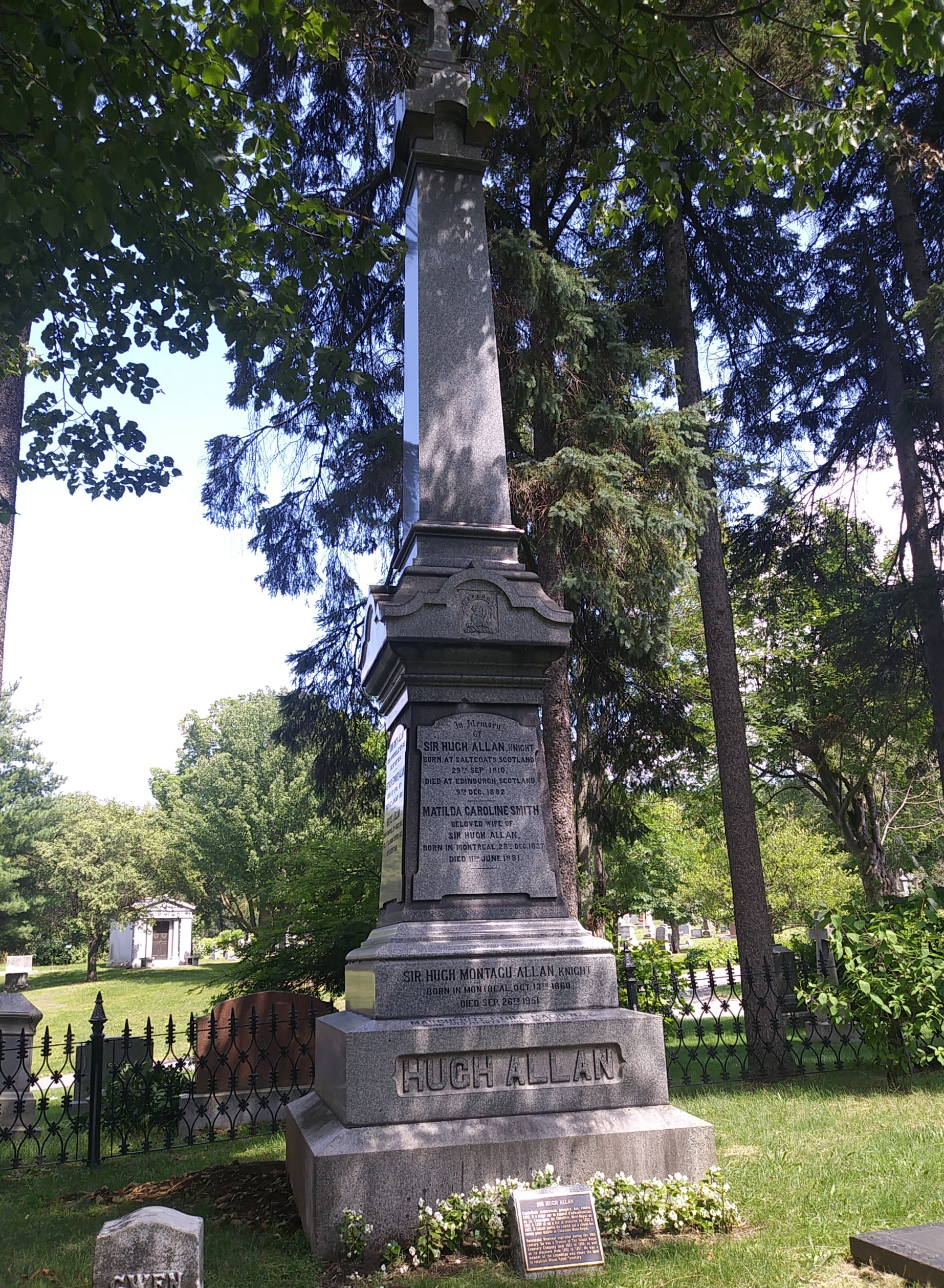
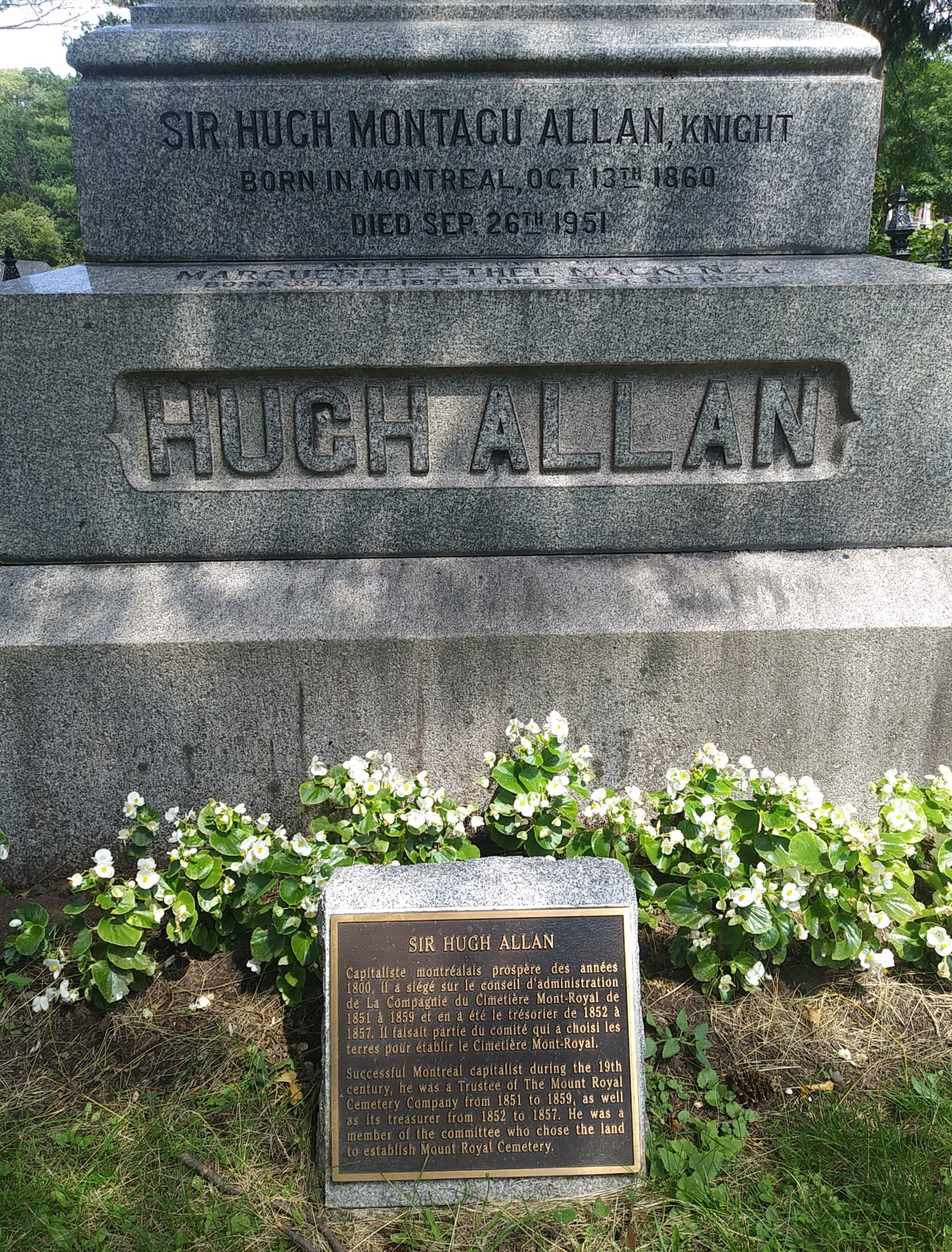
Allan family grave markers in Mount Royal Cemetery

Sir Montagu and Lady Allan lived at Ravenscrag in the Golden Square Mile during the winters and at Montrose in Cacouna during the summers. Sir Montagu also owned Allancroft, a farm near Beaconsfield, where he reared his horses. Allancroft burned down in 1938.

After the death of their youngest daughters, the Allans spent less time at Montrose, and in 1941, they sold the house to the Order of Friars Minor Capuchin for $10,000. In 1940, the Allans gave Ravenscrag to the Royal Victoria Hospital, Montreal. They are interred in Mount Royal Cemetery, next to two of their daughters.

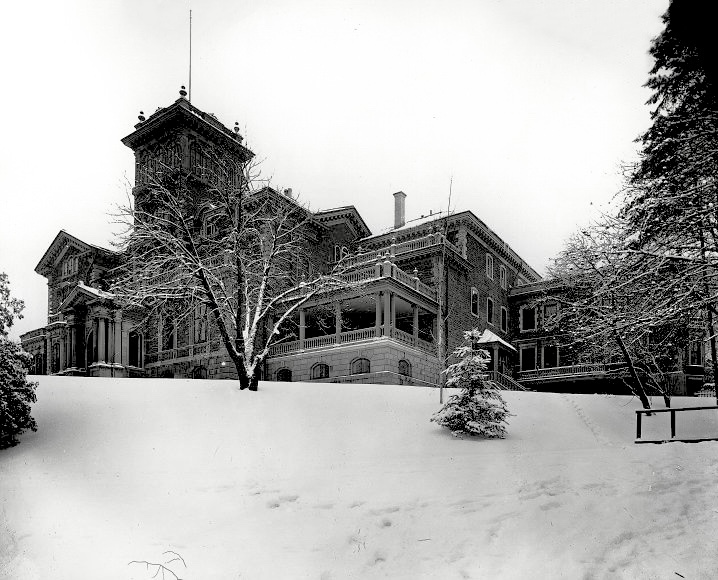
Ravenscrag, the Allans' home in Montreal, 1903

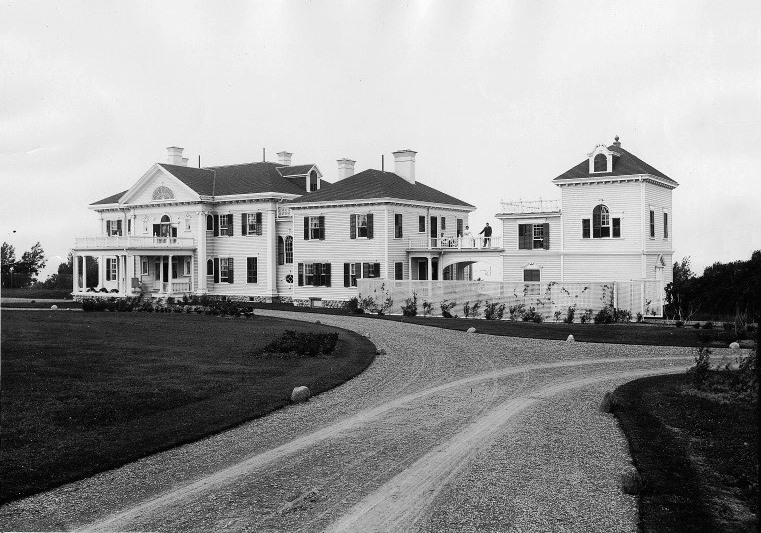
Montrose in Cacouna, the Allans' summer residence, 1901
