= The Chronicle Herald =

Canadian newspaper in Halifax, Nova Scotia

- Type: Daily newspaper
- Format: Broadsheet
- Owner: Postmedia Network
- Founded: 1874
- Headquarters: 2717 Joseph Howe Drive; Halifax, Nova Scotia; B3J 2T2
- Circulation: 91,152 Daily; 93,178 Saturdays (as of 2015)
- ISSN: 0839-4008
- OCLC number: 1032969650
- Website: thechronicleherald.ca

The Chronicle Herald is a broadsheet newspaper published in Halifax, Nova Scotia, owned by Postmedia Network.

== History ==
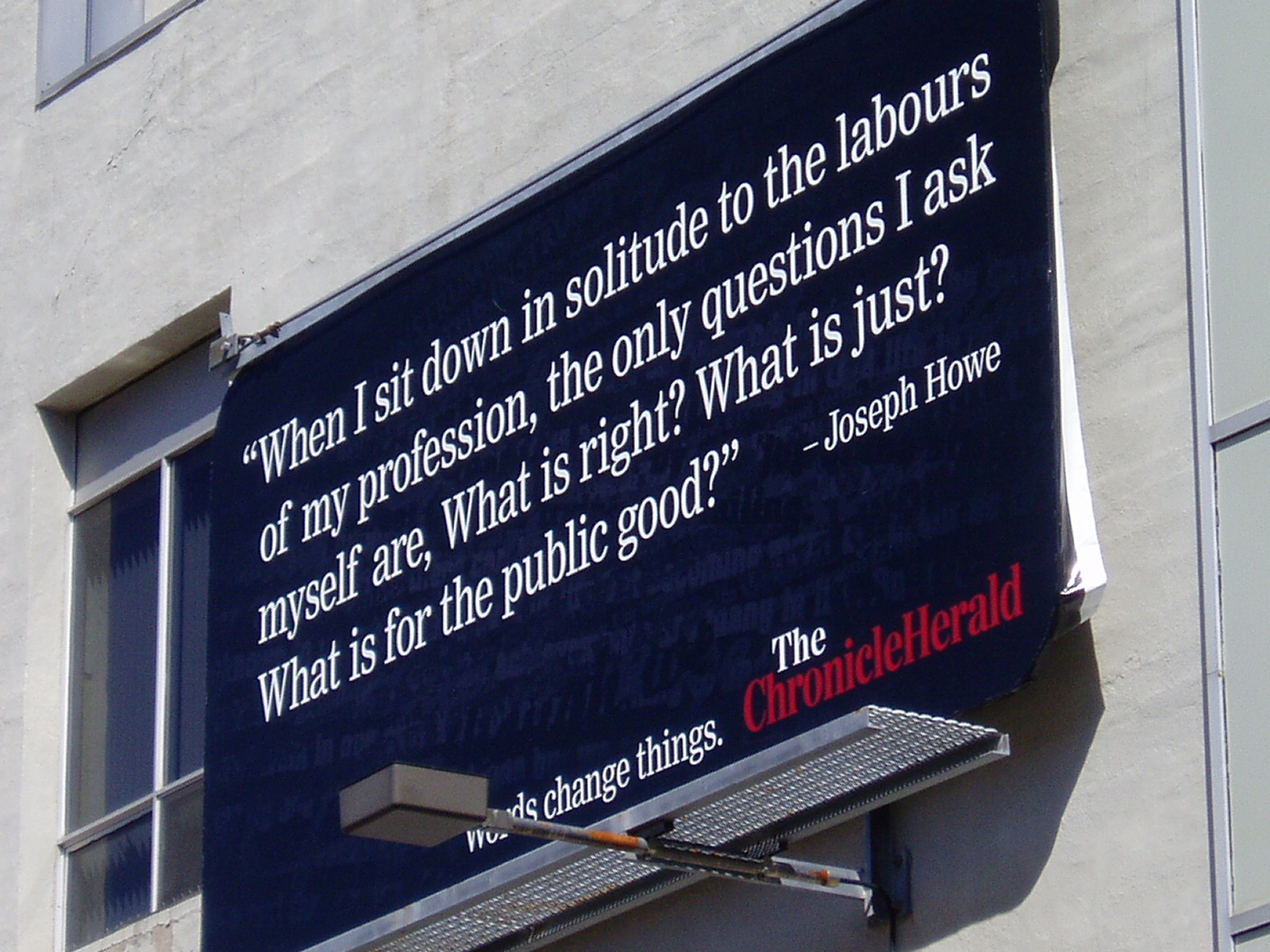
Billboard on the former Herald Building in downtown Halifax, 2007

=== Early years ===
Founded in 1874 as The Morning Herald, the paper quickly became one of Halifax's main newspapers. The same company also owned the Evening Mail, which was published in the afternoon. Its main competitors were the Chronicle in the morning, and the Star in the afternoon. By 1949, the papers had merged to become The Chronicle-Herald and Mail-Star respectively.

=== Graham Dennis era ===
Graham W. Dennis took over as publisher of the newspaper in 1954, at age 26, after the death of his father, senator William Henry Dennis, who in turn had succeeded senator William Dennis in running the paper. He led the newspaper for the next half century. Dennis was proud of the paper's independence and rebuffed numerous offers to buy it. He was known as a humanistic employer interested in the welfare of his employees, stating that his proudest moment was the introduction of a pension plan for Herald staff. He had a reputation as an "old-school media baron" who set up bureaus across Canada, and even one in London, England. Dennis considered the paper essential to effecting positive change in Nova Scotia and ensured that it was available across the province.

In 1998, the company began producing a Sunday edition called The Sunday Herald, which ran until 20 April 2013. In 2004, The Chronicle-Herald and Mail-Star were merged to form the single The Chronicle Herald. In January 2004, The Chronicle Herald became the first newspaper in Canada, and one of only several in the world, to operate a WIFAG offset press. This development led to an increased use of colour, and changes in font and styling.

In 2002 the historic Herald headquarters on Argyle Street was listed for sale for $15 million and sold by the Dennis family to the cable TV mogul Charles Keating. Keating died in 2005. In 2007, Argyle Developments Ltd. purchased the property from his estate. The Chronicle Herald moved in 2008 to one of the buildings on the ex-Maritime Life campus in Armdale. The former Herald buildings were demolished and the site was redeveloped as the Nova Centre, which houses the Halifax Convention Centre.

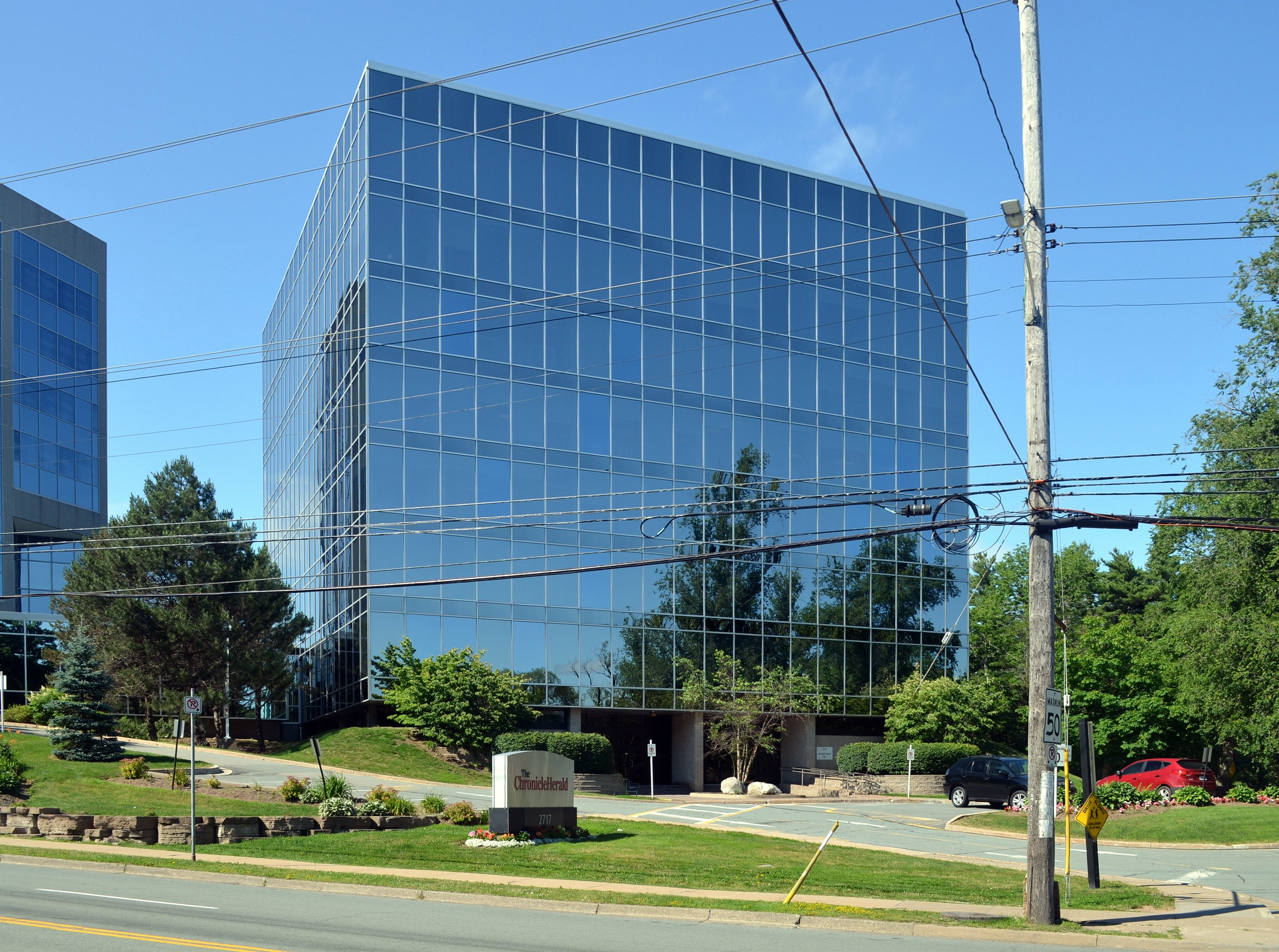
In 2008, the newspaper moved to a new headquarters in Armdale.

In October 2008, The Chronicle Herald was named one of "Canada's Top 100 Employers" by Mediacorp Canada Inc., and was featured in Maclean's newsmagazine.

On 3 February 2009, the paper laid off 24 employees, the first layoffs in the paper's 136-year history. The cuts represented approximately one quarter of its newsroom staff, but it nonetheless remained the largest newsroom east of Montreal. These cuts impacted the production department where nine employees were laid off. The company stated that these layoffs were the result of a decline in advertising due to the distress of the current economic situation.

=== New management ===
Sarah Dennis, daughter of owner Graham Dennis and vice-president since the 1990s, took over as CEO of the newspaper in November 2010. She married Mark Lever in August 2011. Graham Dennis, who ran the newspaper for more than 57 years, died on 1 December 2011, at the age of 84. Sarah Dennis inherited the paper. Lever took over as president and CEO in 2012.

Though the newspaper is profitable, Dennis and Lever have aggressively cut costs in recent years. Dennis holds a "far less romantic view of the newspaper" than her father did, a characteristic that journalist Stephen Kimber said has made cost-cutting easy. Dennis stated: "It's a business, and you have to run it like a business. The history is important, but you can't let that determine what you do."

Shortly after taking over as CEO, Dennis championed the newspaper's independence, stating: "The fact that we're not controlled by someone in Ontario makes a big difference in what we can do." She stated that the newspaper would remain independent as long as possible. However, following her father's death, Dennis stated that she would entertain offers from potential buyers.

Discord erupted in 2011 after the Herald wrote a new contract for freelance journalists that gave the newspaper rights to freelancers' work forever, without any payment for signing over the copyright. Numerous freelancers, including Ralph Surette and Silver Donald Cameron, refused to sign. Dennis stated that the newspaper was simply emulating what other newspapers across the country were doing.

The newspaper purchased Bounty Print, a commercial printing company, in 2011. In 2012, they purchased The Casket, a weekly newspaper published in Antigonish, through a Herald sister company, Brace Publishing Limited. The company also launched the glossy Herald Magazine in February 2012. It launched the Cape Breton Star, a weekly newspaper, in Cape Breton in May 2014.

Circulation has been in decline. In 2012, the Audit Bureau of Circulations reported circulation of 108,389 weekdays, 112,306 Saturdays and 97,190 Sundays In April 2012, the Sunday edition was discontinued as a cost-cutting measure and the Saturday paper was renamed Weekend. Still, in 2013, Sarah Dennis stated that the newspaper was profitable and that readership was at an all-time high. In September 2014, weekday circulation was estimated at 70,000, with the weekend edition selling 72,000. On-line subscriptions totaled 1,862.

In October 2014, the Herald issued layoff notices to 20 newsroom employees.

== 2016–17 labour dispute ==
=== Strike and bargaining ===
In February 2015, the Herald locked out its 13 unionised printing press workers, causing the first work stoppage in the company's history. The lockout ended about a month later, after the union agreed to major concessions.

Less than a year later, on 23 January 2016, 61 members of the Halifax Typographical Union's newsroom and news bureau staff went on strike. The Herald hired "scab" reporters as replacements. The Chronicle Herald refused any concessions offered by the union, and later on the striking staff launched a competing online newspaper called Local Xpress. By September 2016, the number of striking workers was down to 56 as some had sought new employment for financial reasons.

The union criticized the Herald for spending more than $400,000 on security (as at September 2016) while demanding cuts in the newsroom, and stated that the real intention of management was to bust the union. The typographical union also accused Sarah Dennis of hiring private investigators to tail and intimidate picketers.

In September 2016, the Herald announced that it was shutting down the Cape Breton Star due to "a prevailing headwind of union sympathy in industrial Cape Breton".

The union agreed to wage cuts and increased working hours equating to an hourly pay decrease of 17 per cent, layoffs of a third of unionized staff, a cap on severance pay, reductions in vacation time and mileage allowance, a 25 per cent lower starting wage, and elimination of the defined benefit pension plan founded by Graham Dennis. However, the dispute dragged on with no agreement being reached between the two parties. The newspaper was accused of making unreasonable demands with the aim of breaking the union, and hired lawyers advertising services in union-busting.

During a round of bargaining in October 2016, Herald made numerous additional demands, including further cuts to the union's bargaining power, reduced sick leave pay, a further four per cent wage cut, eight more layoffs (amounting to a total of 26 layoffs), and the closure of Local Xpress and the signing-over of all Local Xpress content to the Herald. In November 2016 the union filed a complaint with the Nova Scotia Labour Board accusing the Herald management of "bargaining in a manner designed to end union representation", preventing an agreement from being reached.

As a result of this strike, CEO Mark Lever won the labour news website rankandfile.ca's annual Scumbag of the Year award for 2016. It was the second time in three years a Nova Scotian won this award.

=== Strikebreakers and quality issues ===
Throughout the strike, the Halifax Typographical Union used social media to draw light to typographical and factual errors that plagued the paper since the strike began, and alleged that these quality issues were a result of using inexperienced "scab" staff. In addition, the union and others lambasted the strikebreakers for questionable journalistic practices.

The use of strikebreakers is banned in many countries, but Quebec is the only jurisdiction within Canada that outlaws the practice. Several faculty members at the University of King's College, which is well-regarded for its journalism program, advised graduating students against crossing the picket line. The Herald approached several King's students and were rebuffed.

Investigative journalist Tim Bousquet, of the Halifax Examiner, questioned the newspaper's practice of printing advertorial content nearly indistinguishable from regular news. Similarly, the union pointed out instances of the "scab Herald" reprinting press releases nearly verbatim. Of the quality of the newspaper during the strike, Bousquet wrote: "Without the professional journalists, the paper is crap [...] The Herald has zero credibility. And the complete abandonment of any journalistic standards is showing in spades."

Alex Boutilier of the Toronto Star spoke out after the Herald reprinted one of his articles and attributed it to his name only, with no mention of the Star, making it appear as though he was writing as a strikebreaker. Boutilier stated that he could not find the piece on The Canadian Press news wire while Bousquet commented that aside from the Star, the Herald appears to have been the only other newspaper to print the story. The Herald subsequently removed his byline from the online edition.

=== Chebucto Heights controversy ===
Controversy surrounding an article published 8 April 2016 online (appearing in print on 9 April) made national headlines. The story alleged that Syrian refugee children attending Chebucto Heights Elementary School were "choking, pushing, slapping and verbally abusing their fellow classmates". The paper was widely condemned as the story was unverified, having been based on a sole anonymous source, and was written with a highly sensational tone that alleged acts of "brutality" by children as young as five. It was published anonymously, lacking any byline, and was picked up by right-wing media abroad to bolster anti-refugee sentiment.

The superintendent of the Halifax Regional School Board, Elwin LeRoux, stated that he was "deeply offended to see the school represented so inaccurately". LeRoux stated that the school board had investigated the allegations and had come up empty-handed.

In the face of public outcry the newspaper tweaked the article online, removing some details before deleting it from the Herald website altogether on Monday morning. The paper published an editor's note that admitted the story "needed more work". In the wake of the controversy award-winning non-union columnist Lezlie Lowe quit the newspaper in protest, stating in her farewell column that "The story lays bare the worst of the worst xenophobia in our city and our province. It lacks all proportion. Balance eludes it, start to finish."

=== Regional expansion ===
On 13 April 2017, Transcontinental announced that it had sold all of its newspapers in Atlantic Canada to SaltWire Network, a newly formed parent company of the Herald.

The Halifax Typographical Union called the purchase evidence that the Herald's claim of impending financial collapse was a "total fabrication". The president of CWA Canada also weighed in, stating of the ongoing labour dispute: "This has never been about money. It has been about power and union busting."

=== Government inquiry and conclusion ===
On 13 July 2017, the Department of Labour and Advanced Education announced that it was setting up an Industrial Inquiry Commission, under the provisions of the province's Trade Union Act, to force mediation between the union and the Herald management from 4 August 2017. A union spokesperson called the move "long overdue" while the Herald's chief operating officer called the announcement "puzzling".

The dispute finally ended in August 2017 when the union voted to ratify a new eight-year deal. The agreement included an increase in the work week from 35 to 37.5 hours, the dismissal of 26 union staff (with 25 returning to the newspaper and one moving to Cape Breton), and wage cuts.

== Circulation ==
The Chronicle Herald has seen like most Canadian daily newspapers a decline in circulation. Its total circulation dropped by 15 percent to 91,490 copies daily from 2009 to 2015. The Chronicle Herald is the highest circulation newspaper in the Atlantic provinces, although it briefly lost that title to the now-defunct StarMetro Halifax (formerly Metro Halifax).

Daily average

== Notable personnel ==
=== Editors ===
- William Dennis
- Robert McCleave
- Jane Purves

=== Journalists ===
- Linden MacIntyre
- Judi McLeod
- Walter D. O'Hearn (Halifax Herald, 1929–1932)

=== Columnists ===
- George Bain
- Silver Donald Cameron
- Scott Taylor (current)
- Jan Wong
- Sylvain Charlebois (researcher, current)

=== Cartoonists ===
- Bob Chambers
- Michael de Adder
- Bruce MacKinnon (current)
- Owen McCarron

== See also ==
- List of newspapers in Canada
