= Badgley =

Badgley is a surname. Notable people with the surname include:

- Aaron Badgley (born 1964), Canadian music journalist and radio host
- Catherine E. Badgley, American paleontologist
- Elaine Badgley Arnoux (1926–2023), American visual artist
- Francis Badgley (doctor) (1807–1863), Canadian physician
- Francis Badgley (merchant) (1767–1841), Canadian politician
- Helen Badgley (1908–1977), American actress
- Michael Badgley (born 1995), American football player
- Penn Badgley (born 1986), American actor
- Sidney Badgley (1850–1917), Canadian-born American architect
- William Badgley (1801–1888), Canadian judge and attorney
- William E. Badgley, American musician and documentary filmmaker

== See also ==
- Badgley Mischka
