= Frederick Edmund Meredith =

Canadian lawyer (1862–1941)

F. E. Meredith KC
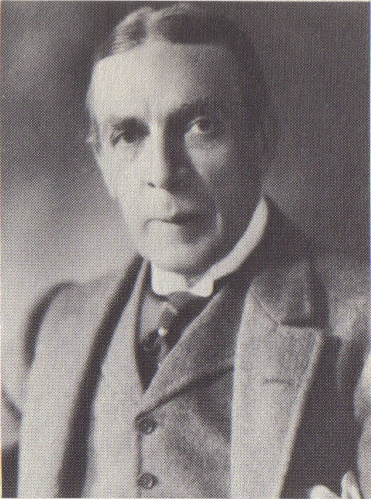
- Born: Frederick Edmund Meredith; January 16, 1862; Quebec City, Canada East
- Died: September 23, 1941 (aged 79); Montreal, Quebec, Canada
- Resting place: Mount Royal Cemetery
- Occupations: lawyer and businessman; Chancellor of Bishop's University; President of the Montreal Victorias and the Mount Royal Club

Frederick Edmund Meredith KC (January 16, 1862 – September 23, 1941) was a Canadian lawyer and businessman. He was the 8th Chancellor of Bishop's University; President of the Mount Royal Club; Bâtonnier of the Bar of Montreal; President of the Montreal Victorias for three of their Stanley Cup championships in the late 1890s, and Chief Counsel to the CPR at the inquest into the sinking of RMS Empress of Ireland.

The F.E. Meredith Memorial Prize is a scholarship given to students graduating in an English program with the best written English at Bishop's University.

== Early life ==
Born at Quebec City, F.E. Meredith was the youngest son of Chief Justice Sir William Collis Meredith of Quebec and his wife, Sophia Naters Holmes (1820–1898), grand-daughter of William Holmes. One of his godfathers was his father's first cousin, Sir Richard Graves MacDonnell, and the other was his uncle, Edmund Allen Meredith, for whom he was given his middle name. Edmund Meredith was also uncle and godfather to Sir Augustus Meredith Nanton, with whom Meredith would later sit with on the board of the Canadian Pacific Railway. Meredith's father was a first cousin of John Walsingham Cooke Meredith, the father of the Eight London Merediths who included among them Sir Vincent Meredith and Charles Meredith, both close friends and business associates. He was educated at Bishop's College School. Following a year in France, he returned to Canada to read law at Bishop's University (B.A., M.A.), and Université Laval (LL.B., LL.L., LL.M., LL.D.). He was called to the Bar of Quebec in 1884, commencing his career as a barrister specializing in corporate law in the firm of Abbott & Badgeley at Montreal.

== Legal and business career ==
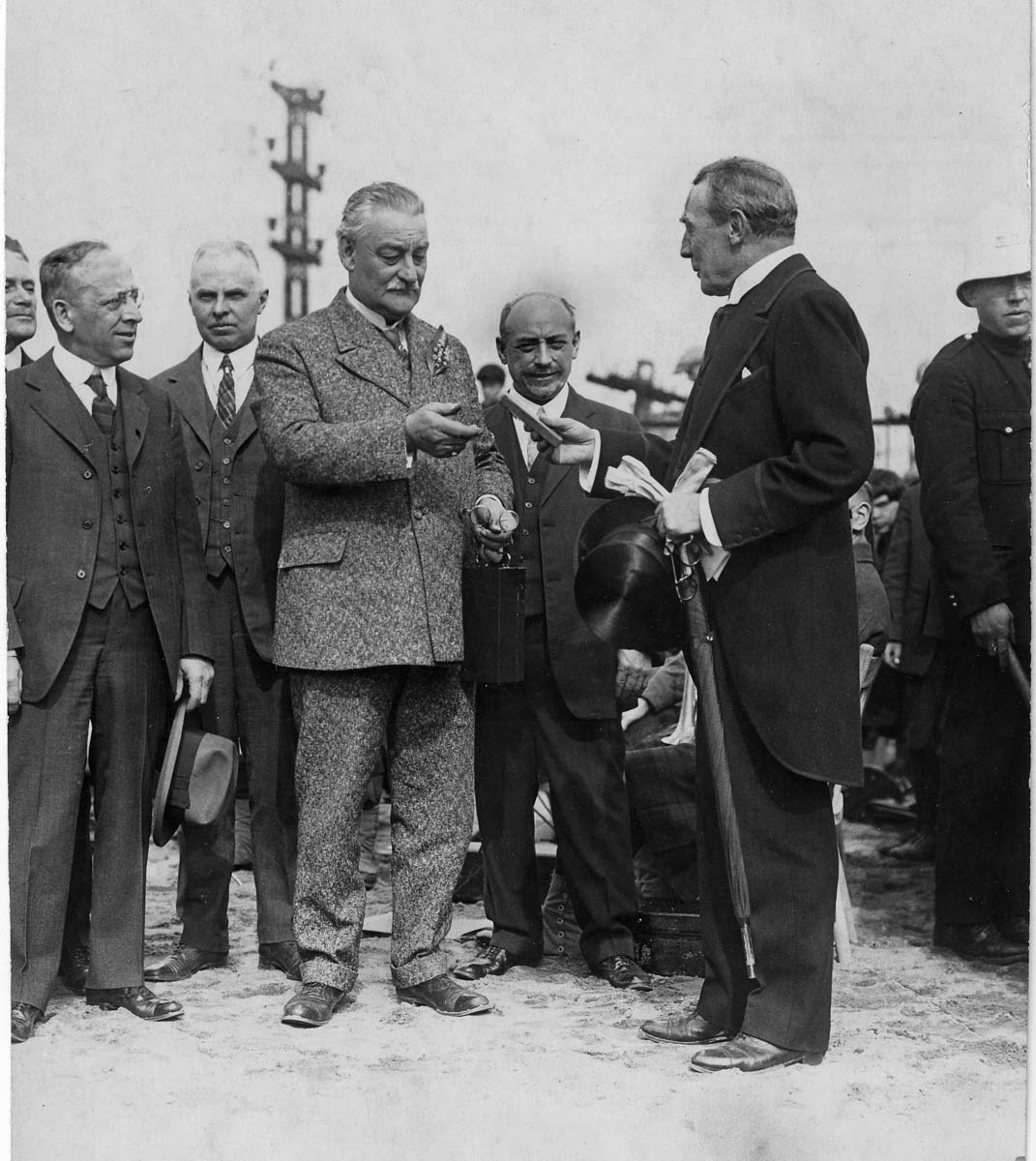
Meredith (right), executor of the will of Charles Campbell, presents the keys for the new Campbell playground in the East End of Montreal to Mayor Médéric Martin (left), 1926

In 1898, Meredith and his two closest friends from Laval, Charles Sandwith Campbell and James Bryce Allan (1861–1945) K.C. (brother of his cousin's wife, Lady Vincent Meredith), took over from the ageing Sir John Abbott and William Badgley to become the firm's new senior partners. Since the departure of his father from Montreal to Quebec City in 1849, the law firm of Abbott (who had articled under his father) and Badgley had become the most influential in the city, which was then the financial capital of Canada. The firm's major clients included Canadian Pacific Railway, the Bank of Montreal, the Hudson's Bay Company, the Allan Line, the Bank of British North America, Molson Bank, Dominion Textile, Hugh Allan's Merchant's Bank and the Ritz-Carlton Hotel. Campbell, Meredith & Allan continued the firm's dominance, acting as lawyers to the majority of the residents of the Golden Square Mile. Today the firm is known as Borden Ladner Gervais.

Created a Queen's Counsel in 1899, Meredith became Syndic of the Bar of Montreal in 1904/05; Councillor and Trustee of the Montreal Bar Association; Delegate of the Montreal Bar to the General Council of the Province, along with another close friend, Aime Geoffrion, 1906. In 1907, he was elected Bâtonnier of the Bar of Montreal, and in an address in this capacity before the Empire Club of Canada, he stressed the need for more justices in the Superior Court and declared his opposition to the proposed abolition of the Admiralty Court. He was the Solicitor to the Shipping Federation of Canada in the early 1900s, and represented his client company, the CPR, as their Chief Consul at the investigation into the sinking of the RMS Empress of Ireland, presided over by Lord Mersey. In 1930, Meredith and Sir Edward Beatty were received at the White House by President Herbert Hoover. Privy Council cases took him often to England, and he twice turned down offers to become a judge, preferring to maintain the business connections he held with many of his client companies.

His personal popularity, derived from graciousness of manner and sincerity of feeling, coupled with his intimate association with many of Canada's larger business concerns made him a desirable addition to the boards of a number of the country’s foremost corporations including: the Bank of Montreal; Royal Trust Company; Canadian Pacific Railway; Canadian Pacific Steamships; Standard Life of Edinburgh; Royal Securities Corporation; The National Steel Car Corporation; Canadian Cottons Ltd.; Lake Superior Corporation; National Liverpool Insurance Company (England); Montreal & General Investor Ltd.; The Banker's Trust Company and the Liverpool, London & Globe Insurance Company in England. When the National City Company of New York City had a subsidiary in Montreal, Meredith was chosen as a member of the advisory board.

== Bishop's and Université Laval ==
His interest in various educational and cultural undertakings was well known, particularly in the progress and welfare of Bishops University, where he led the successful financial campaign of 1924. As an advocate to many of the country's largest corporations, along with his family connections and strength of character, Meredith wielded a very considerable influence in Quebec. In 1926, he succeeded his brother-in-law's first cousin, John Hamilton, becoming the 8th chancellor of Bishop's, a position he held until 1932. Principal Arthur McGreer later stated that all the substantial financial gifts from 1924 onwards had in some cases been entirely, and in most cases largely, due to Meredith. The F.E. Meredith Prize at Bishop’s was endowed after his death by his son, W.C.J. Meredith, awarded annually to the student with the best written English graduating from an English course. Fred Meredith also donated the Meredith Cup which is still competed for annually between the golfers of the college. In 1904, Université Laval conferred on him the degree of Doctor of Civil Law (D.C.L.) honoris causa. To commemorate the event, Meredith instituted a scholarship payable each year to the graduating student of the law faculty who obtained the highest marks. He and his two former business partners, Charles Sandwith Campbell and James Bryce Allan, also endowed the Prix Jette, awarded annually to the best student in civil law at their shared alma mater, Université Laval.

== Family ==
In 1903, Meredith married Anne Madeleine VanKoughnet (1863–1945), daughter of Mathew Robert VanKoughnet (1824–1874) of Toronto and Cornwall, a Barrister and Bencher of the Law Society of Upper Canada. Her father practised law with his brother, The Hon. Philip Michael Matthew Scott VanKoughnet, later Chancellor of Upper Canada, and together they acquired the largest legal practice brought together in Upper Canada. Her mother, Elizabeth Hagerman Macaulay (1826–1899), was a daughter of George Macaulay (1796-1828) of Bath, Upper Canada, and a niece of John Simcoe Macaulay, Sir James Buchanan Macaulay, Christopher Alexander Hagerman and John Solomon Cartwright.

Mrs. Meredith was the widow of Francis Wolferstan Thomas, by whom she had three children. She served with Lady Meredith as a Governor of the Montreal Maternity Hospital.

From 1903, Meredith lived at a house designed for him by Robert Findlay on Pine Avenue in Montreal's Golden Square Mile. He also variously kept rooms at the Ritz Carlton, Mount Royal Club and University Club. Meredith and his wife 'mutually consented to separate' in 1913, leaving one son, William Campbell James Meredith, who married the youngest daughter of Louis de Lotbiniere-Harwood.

When Mrs. Meredith separated from her husband in 1913, she moved to England, living in Knightsbridge, London. During World War I, she served with the Canadian Red Cross at the Moor Park Convalescent Home for Canadian Officers, in Devon. In 1942, Mrs. Meredith went to stay with her daughter Shearme and her husband, Lt.-Col. John Lionel Philips, at their home Abbey Cwmhir Hall. During her stay, she fell ill and, three years later, she died there on July 27, 1945. A funeral service was held for her at Penybont, where there is a bench in the churchyard to her memory. She was survived by her four children and two of her sisters, Mrs. Frank Wolff May of Montreal and Lady van Straubenzee of London.

== Private life ==
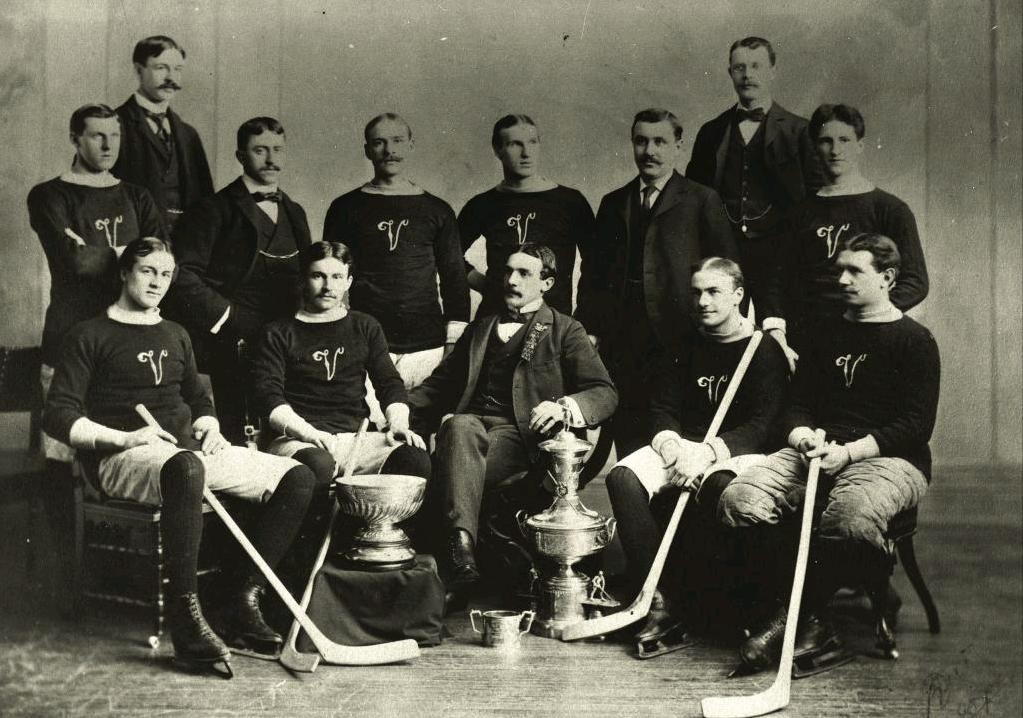
Fred Meredith at centre with the Montreal Victorias, 1897 Stanley Cup Champions

Meredith had been a noted sportsman. Playing Rackets, he was a Dominion finalist on one occasion and frequently represented Canada in competitions against the United States. In 1897 he won the championship of the Montreal Rackets Club, and was the runner-up in 1898. As a young man he'd also played ice hockey, and he was elected the honorary president of the Montreal Victorias when they won the Stanley Cup in 1895, 1896 and 1897. He later sponsored an ice hockey team for the office boys in his firm, and amateur golf competitions. He raced with the old Montreal Jockey Club, took flying lessons in Winnipeg and fox hunted with relatives in England, Ireland, and with the Montreal Hunt. He played tennis into his seventies, notably in John Wilson McConnell's group, and at the Mount Royal Tennis Club. He was Chairman of the Montreal Shakespeare Club and a generous donator to Martha Allan's Montreal Repertory Theatre. At university he developed a keen interest in photography, and at one stage considered an apprenticeship with William Notman. He belonged to many sporting and social clubs in Montreal and served as President of three of them: the Mount Royal Club, the Montreal Racquet Club and the University Club. In England, he belonged to the St James's Club, Travellers Club, Marlborough and British Empire clubs.

== Obituary ==
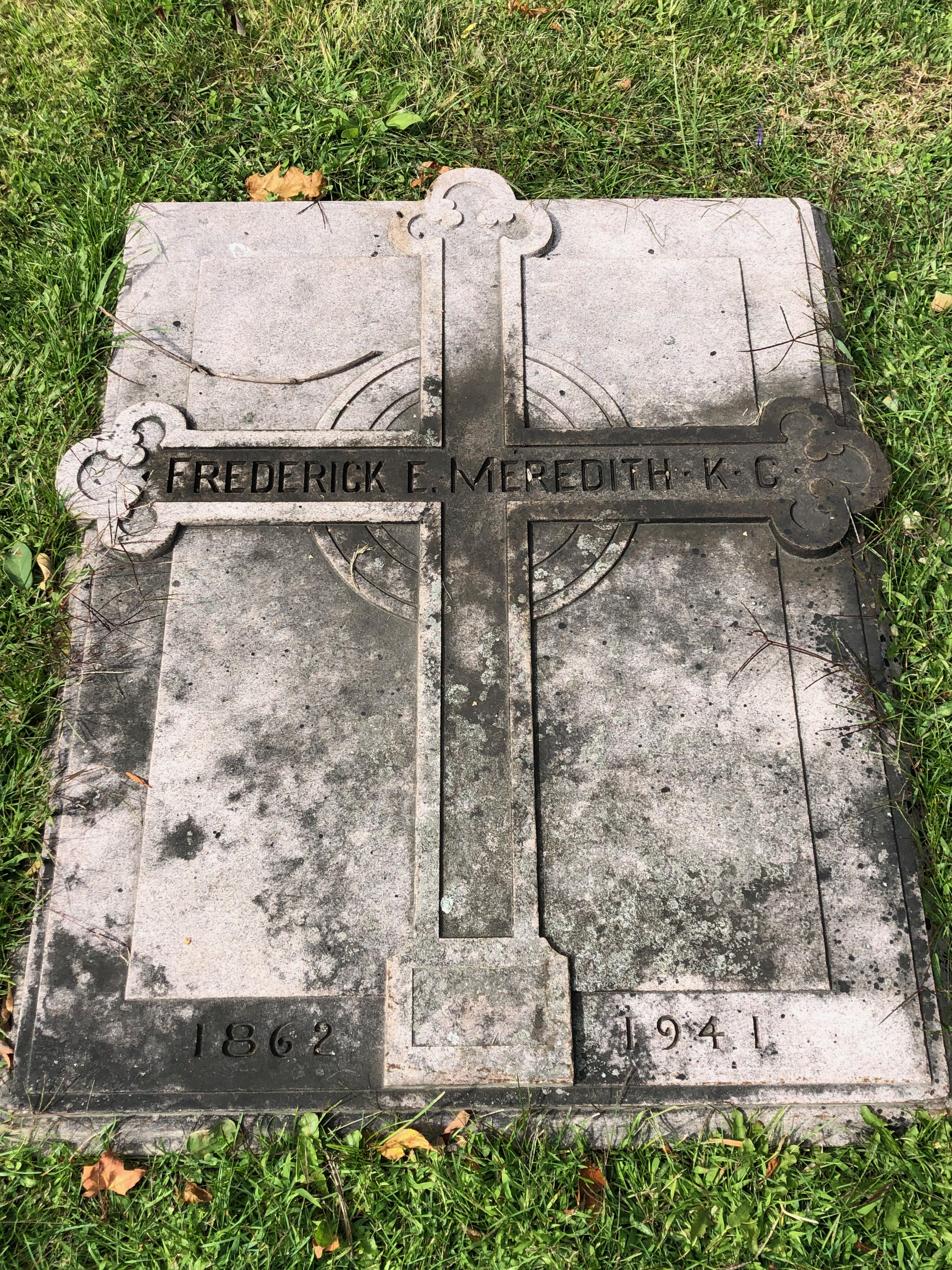
Meredith's funeral monument in Mount Royal Cemetery.

F.E. Meredith was well remembered for his dry sense of humour and was frequently described as "the most colourful and prominent figure" on the Bar of Montreal and "one of the most eminent personalities not only in the Quebec Bar but in the whole of Canada". Arnold Heeney especially recalled the generosity of F.E. Meredith, "that grand old dandy... who would quite often have me home with him for lunch, and test me with the largest, strongest martinis I had ever known". Horst Oertel wrote An Appreciation to his friend that was published in The Times of London in 1941,

The death of Frederick Edmund Meredith K.C., D.C.L., LL.D., has removed an outstanding Canadian who combined in a rare degree fine British traditions with Canadian outlook in a new world. May I just pay a personal tribute? Few men are able to impress others by the qualities of their individuality as Meredith did. Rather serious in his outlook on things and events, yet with a charming touch of Puck and Ariel in his nature, he united the imagination of his Irish ancestry with a sense of reality, responsibility and sympathetic feeling for others to a rare degree. To help those who were in difficulties was a joy and reward to him; his friendship was unbounded. Emotional to a high degree, he never expressed a vicious thought, and I knew him intimately for nearly 30 years. He had many friends on both sides of the Atlantic, and Privy Council cases brought him frequently to London. Whoever met him felt the better for it and wished more. I imagine that there are not many men who may warm both hands at the fire of life and combine the dignity and joy of living as Fred Meredith did.

Meredith died shortly before his eightieth birthday ('birthdays are not the kind of thing one wants to commemorate' he once said), after an illness of several weeks. He died at his home on Pine Avenue in the Golden Square Mile shortly after eleven o'clock of that morning, predominantly of old age. Meredith's funeral was one of the largest ever seen in Montreal, and out of respect the practice division of the courts were closed for the day. The city's legal and business communities turned out in full force, and both were represented among his pall-bearers who included Sir Edward Beatty, Sir Montagu Allan, Sir Herbert Holt and Chief Justice R.A.E. Greenshields. He was buried in the Meredith plot at Mount Royal Cemetery, Montreal, next to his cousins, Sir Vincent Meredith and Charles Meredith and their respective wives.

== See also ==
- List of Bishop's College School alumni
