= Charles Sandwith Campbell =

Canadian lawyer (1858–1923)

Charles Sandwith Campbell, KC (1858–1923) was a wealthy corporate lawyer and benefactor who gave the City of Montreal the Campbell Concerts and Campbell Parks. He was a Governor of McGill University.

== Early life and education ==
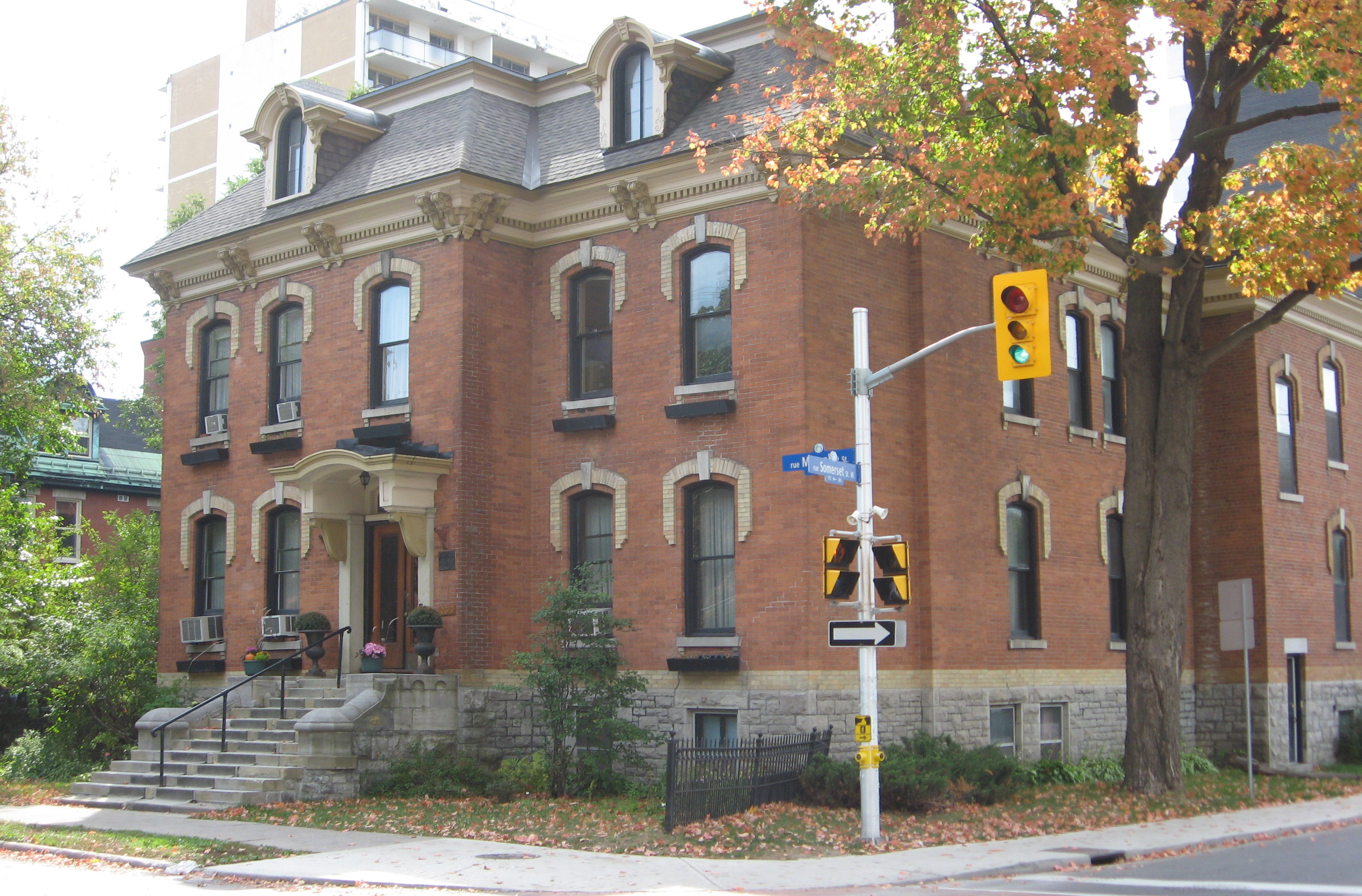
Campbell's childhood home in Ottawa

Born in 1858 at Kingston, Canada West, Campbell was the eldest son of Sir Alexander Campbell, Postmaster General of Canada and Lieutenant-Governor of Ontario. His mother, Georgina Fredrica Locke Sandwith, was the daughter of Thomas Sandwith of Beverley, Yorkshire, a medical practitioner, and was a first cousin of Humphrey Sandwith.

Campbell grew up in Ottawa and was educated at Bishop's College School in Lennoxville, Quebec and afterwards at Laval University, where he graduated avec grande distinction. In 1877, he continued his legal education in England at Trinity College, Cambridge, entering Lincoln's Inn the following year. He graduated B.A., LL.B. in 1881.

== Career ==
In 1884, Campbell returned to Canada and entered the Montreal law firm of William Badgley and John Abbott, becoming a senior partner in 1887. In 1889, he and two other former Laval students, Frederick Edmund Meredith and James Bryce Allan (1861–1945) K.C. (son of Andrew Allan and brother of Lady Meredith), took over from the old senior partners and formed the firm of Campbell, Meredith & Allan.

In 1901 the firm of Montreal corporation lawyers represented many of the wealthy companies of the Golden Square Mile, including Bank of Montreal; Canadian Pacific Railway; Montreal Stock Exchange; Allan Line Steamship Co.; Sir Hugh Allan's Merchants Bank of Canada; Molson Bank; Montreal Street Railway; Montreal Trust and Deposit Co.; American Tobacco Company, of Canada; John De Kuyper & Son; Elder & Dempster Shipping; Hamburg American Packet Shipping Co.; Ocean Accident and the Guarantee Corporation. Today the firm is known as Borden Ladner Gervais.

Campbell concerned himself mainly with corporate and commercial affairs, rarely entering into litigation. He served as an officer with the Montreal Garrison Artillery and was on the executive board of the Montreal Liberal-Conservatives Association.

Campbell served as a director of many client companies including the Montreal Terminal Railway, and he sat on the board of Governors of McGill University. Campbell retired from legal practice in 1910, retiring to his farm at Dorval. Already a director of the Montreal Jockey Club and on the committee of the Montreal Horse Show, he became involved in breeding racehorses. But, frustrated by the rules which prohibited the importation of better breeding stock from outside Canada, he abandoned it after only three years. He sold his racing farm and bought another big estate at Stanbridge East, Quebec in the Eastern Townships, where he continued his interest in scientific farming. For the remainder of his life he spent his summers in Montreal. He is buried in the Stanbridge Ridge Cemetery in Stanbridge East.

== Campbell Concerts and Parks ==
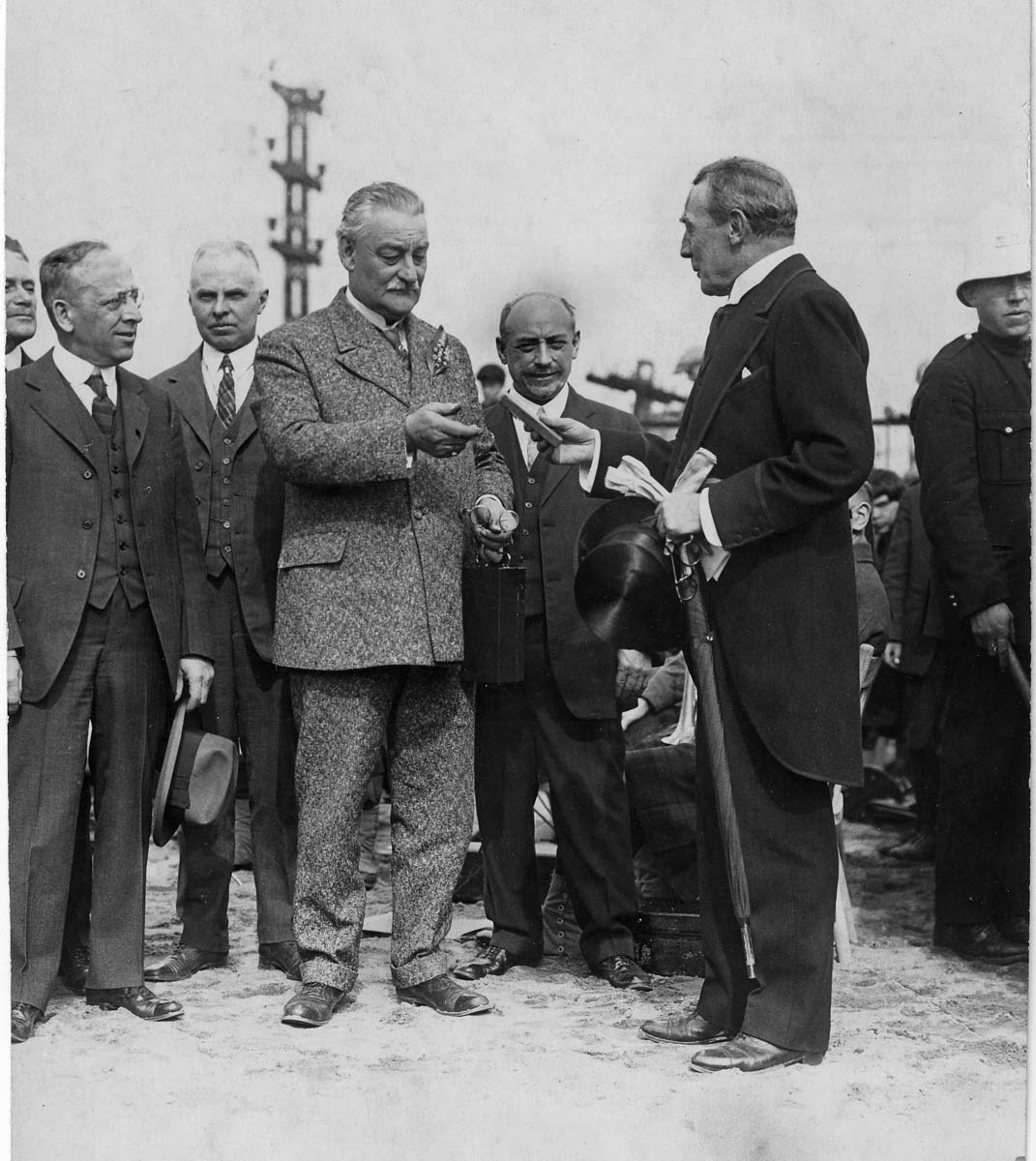
F.E. Meredith (right), presents the keys for the new Campbell playground (formerly Sohmer Park) in the East End working class area of Montreal to Mayor Médéric Martin (left) in 1926.

Charles Campbell was unmarried when he died in 1923, leaving an estate worth $2 million. The executor of the will was his former business partner and closest friend, F.E. Meredith. After provision had been made for the upkeep of Campbell's horse, Kodak, the remainder of the will was divided into five parts.

The first part of his estate went to the Montreal General Hospital; the second to the Kingston General Hospital and the third to various relatives and friends. The remaining two parts, worth one million dollars, were left to the City of Montreal. One part was to purchase parkland "in congested parts of the City of Montreal to make playgrounds for young children not too far from their parents abodes" and the second part was to provide an income to be used "to encourage the playing on summer evenings of bands of music in the public places handy to the congested parts of the city". In 1949, the Montreal Herald reported,

"Nobody has named a street nor a park for him. No bandsman has dedicated a composition, nor civic body erected a monument to him. But Charles Sandwith Campbell has left his own enduring monument, sounding forever in the ears of a million Montrealers, his heirs at large." Today there are three Campbell Parks in Montreal and concerts in his name are still given at no charge for the people of Montreal.

== See also ==
- Université Laval
- List of Bishop's College School alumni
