= Francis Badgley =

Francis Badgley may refer to:

- Francis Badgley (merchant) (1767–1841), Canadian merchant, politician, and newspaper editor
- Francis Badgley (doctor) (1807–1863), his son, Canadian physician
