= W. C. J. Meredith =

Canadian lawyer and legal scholar (1904–1960)

W. C. J. Meredith QC
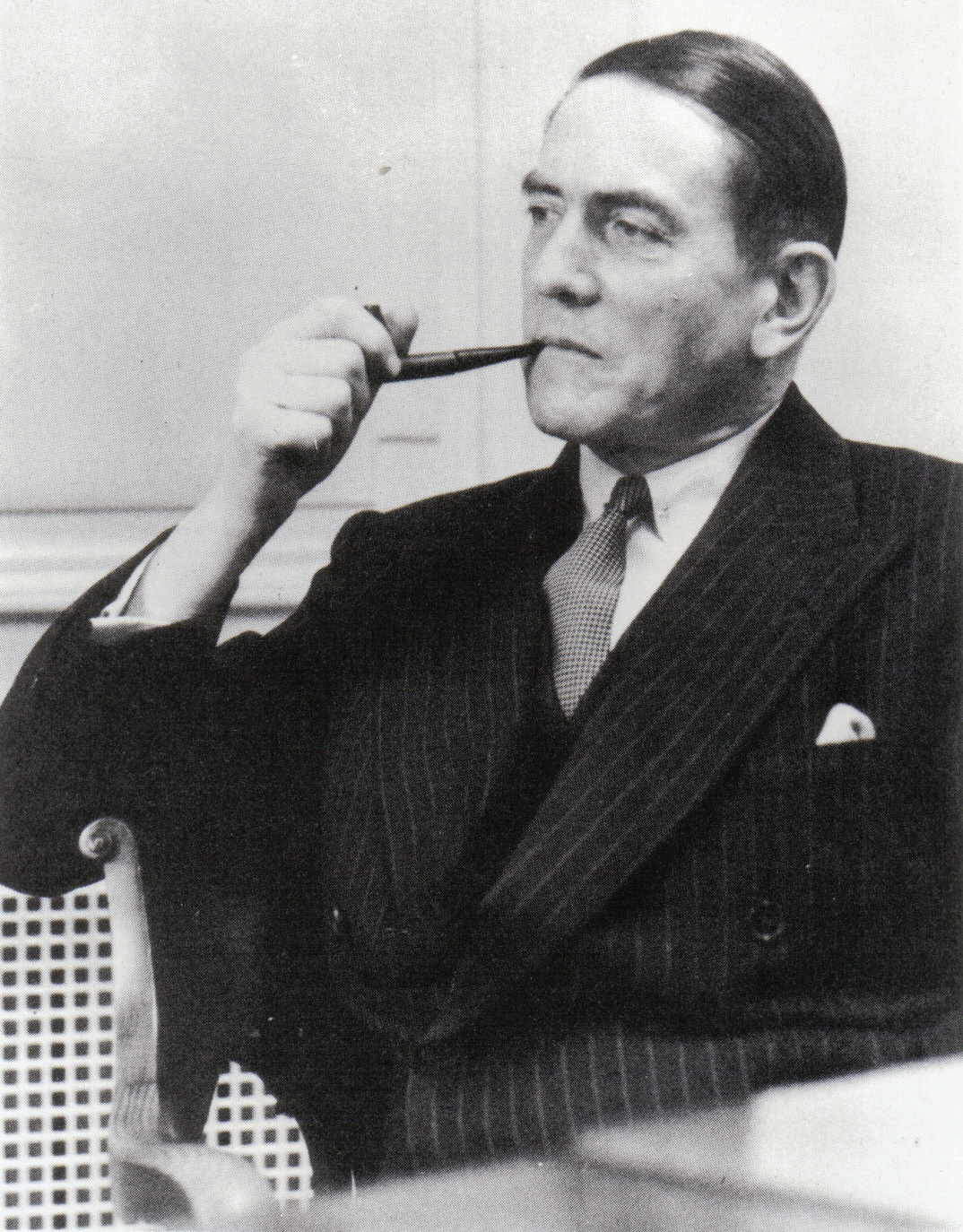
- Meredith in 1950
- Born: William Campbell James Meredith; February 6, 1904; Montreal, Quebec, Canada
- Died: 1960 (aged 55–56); Montreal, Quebec, Canada
- Occupations: Lawyer; legal scholar
- Title: Dean of Law at McGill University (1950–1960)
- Spouse: Marie-Berthe-Louise-Francoise Martin (m. 1935; div. 1949)
- Parents: Frederick Edmund Meredith; Anne Madeleine VanKoughnet

Academic background
- Education: Trinity College, Cambridge

Academic work
- Discipline: Law
- Institutions: McGill University
- Main interests: Automobile accident law; criminal insanity; medical malpractice

William Campbell James Meredith QC (1904–1960), often referred to as W. C. J. Meredith, was a Canadian lawyer, the author of three legal texts, and Dean of the McGill University Faculty of Law (1950–1960). In 1951, he was noted for the prescient hiring of John Cobb Cooper to head up the new department he created, McGill's Institute of Air Space Law.

Meredith was born on February 6, 1904, in Montreal, Quebec, the only son of Frederick Edmund Meredith and Anne Madeleine VanKoughnet. The jurist William Collis Meredith was his grandfather. He was educated in England at Summer Fields School; Wellington College, Berkshire; and, Trinity College, Cambridge. He also studied for a year at the University of Grenoble in France. Considered an expert in litigation, he became a senior partner in his father's law firm and was made a King's Counsel in 1942. He was selected by the government to be the special federal prosecutor at the trial of Fred Rose. He was governor of Selwyn House School and Bishop's University. In 1950, John Wilson McConnell, Governor of McGill University, persuaded him to take up the position of Dean at Law at McGill. He held this position until his death.

In 1935, he married Marie-Berthe-Louise-Francoise Martin. They were the parents of one son, but divorced 14 November 1949, by a private act of Parliament (13 Geo. VI. c. 154). Privately, he was an amateur radio enthusiast who enjoyed tennis and skiing and had in his early years been a member of the Montreal Hunt. He died in 1960 in Montreal, and is buried at Mount Royal Cemetery. The Meredith Memorial Lectures at McGill University are named in his memory.

== Bibliography ==
- "Insanity as a Criminal Defence" (Wilson & Lafleur, 1931)
- "Civil Law on Automobile Accidents, Quebec" (Wilson & Lafleur, 1940)
- "Malpractice Liability of Doctors and Hospitals: Common Law and Quebec Law" (Carswell Company, 1956) OCLC 4649590
