= Westmount City Hall =

Local government building in Quebec, Canada

- Interactive map of the Westmount City Hall area

General information
- Architectural style: Tudor Revival
- Location: 4333 Sherbrooke Street West, Westmount, Quebec, Canada
- Coordinates: 45.4855°N 73.5968°W
- Opened: 1922
- Renovated: November 6, 1965

Technical details
- Floor count: 3

Design and construction
- Architects: Robert Findlay, Francis R. Findlay

Westmount City Hall is the seat of local government in Westmount, Quebec, Canada. It is located at 4333 Sherbrooke Street West below Côte Saint Antoine Road.

It was designed by architects Francis R. Findlay and Robert Findlay in the Neo-Tudor style. Its style is reminiscent of Scottish castles, with its central tower and crenelations and turrets. It was completed in 1922, with its cornerstone containing various historical documents being laid on October 14, 1922 by Mayor P.W. McLagan. It underwent a major interior renovation that was completed in 1965.
