= Stewart Hall (Pointe-Claire) =

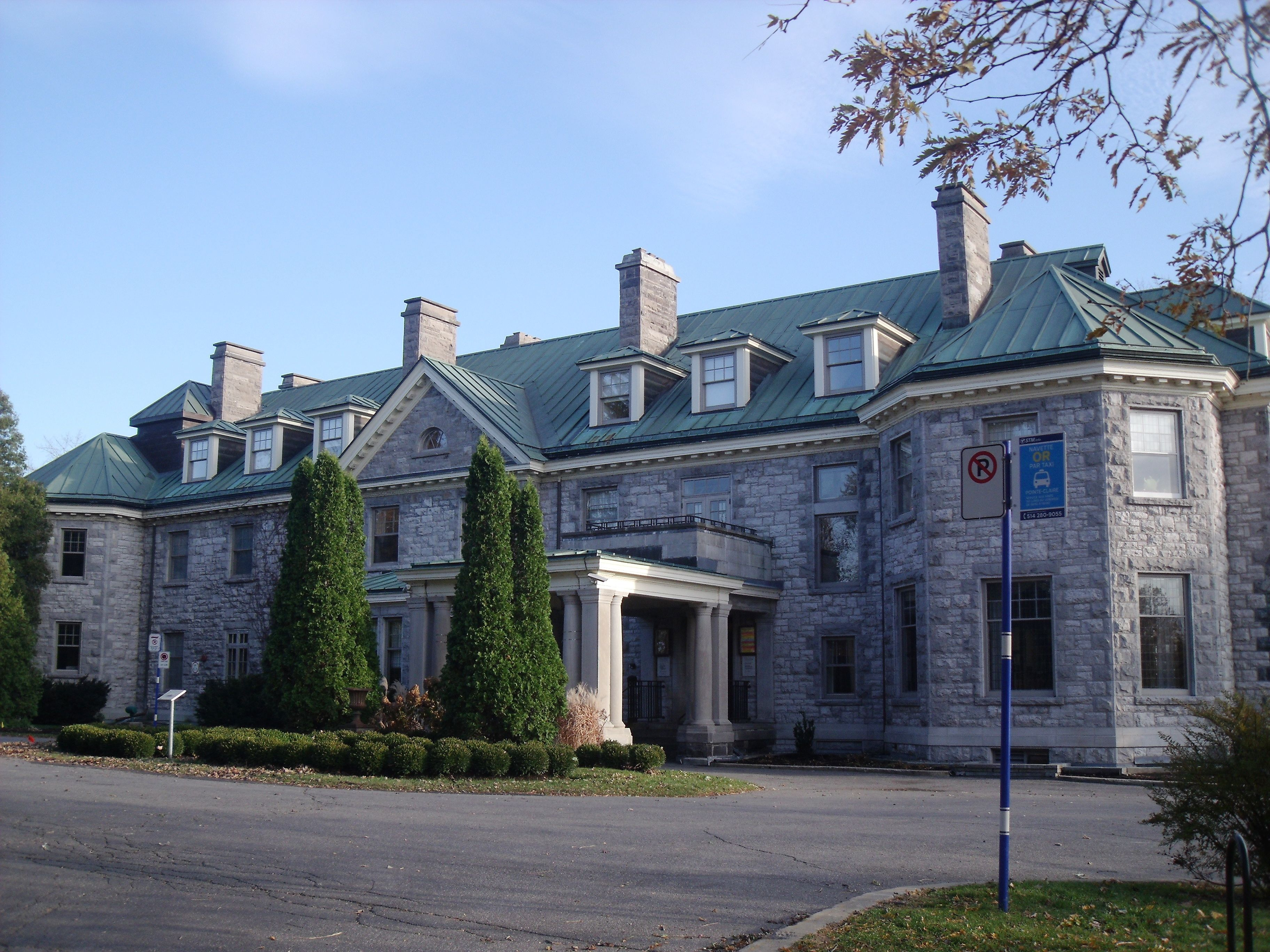

- Location within Montreal
- Established: 16 February 1963
- Location: 176 Lakeshore Road, Pointe-Claire, Quebec, Canada
- Coordinates: 45.4344°N 73.8082°W
- Type: Art gallery
- Collection size: 250
- Visitors: 10,000
- Owner: City of Pointe-Claire

Stewart Hall (originally Mull Hall) is a cultural centre and art gallery in Pointe-Claire, Quebec, Canada.

Originally built as a private mansion, today Stewart Hall houses a cultural centre, a reading and reference room, an art gallery, and a community centre.

== History ==
Mull Hall was constructed for Charles Wesley MacLean in 1915–16 to plans by architect Robert Findlay. The house was named for the Isle of Mull, which was the ancestral home of Clan MacLean in the Scottish Highlands.

The Fathers of Sainte-Croix acquired the mansion in 1940, and they continued to operate the farm on the surrounding land.

In 1958, the Fathers of Sainte-Croix sold the land to a real estate developer, who was planning to build a high-rise apartment building on the site. However, the property was purchased by Walter and May Stewart (the parents of David M. Stewart), who donated it to the city of Pointe-Claire in exchange for $1.

The city of Pointe-Claire turned the house into a cultural centre, which was inaugurated on February 16, 1963.

== Architecture ==
The exterior walls of the house are made from locally sourced limestone blocks. The building's design is symmetrical, and consists of thirty five rooms. A large veranda overlooks Lake Saint-Louis.
