= Martlet House =

Building in Montreal, Quebec

Coordinates: 45°30′01″N 73°34′26″W

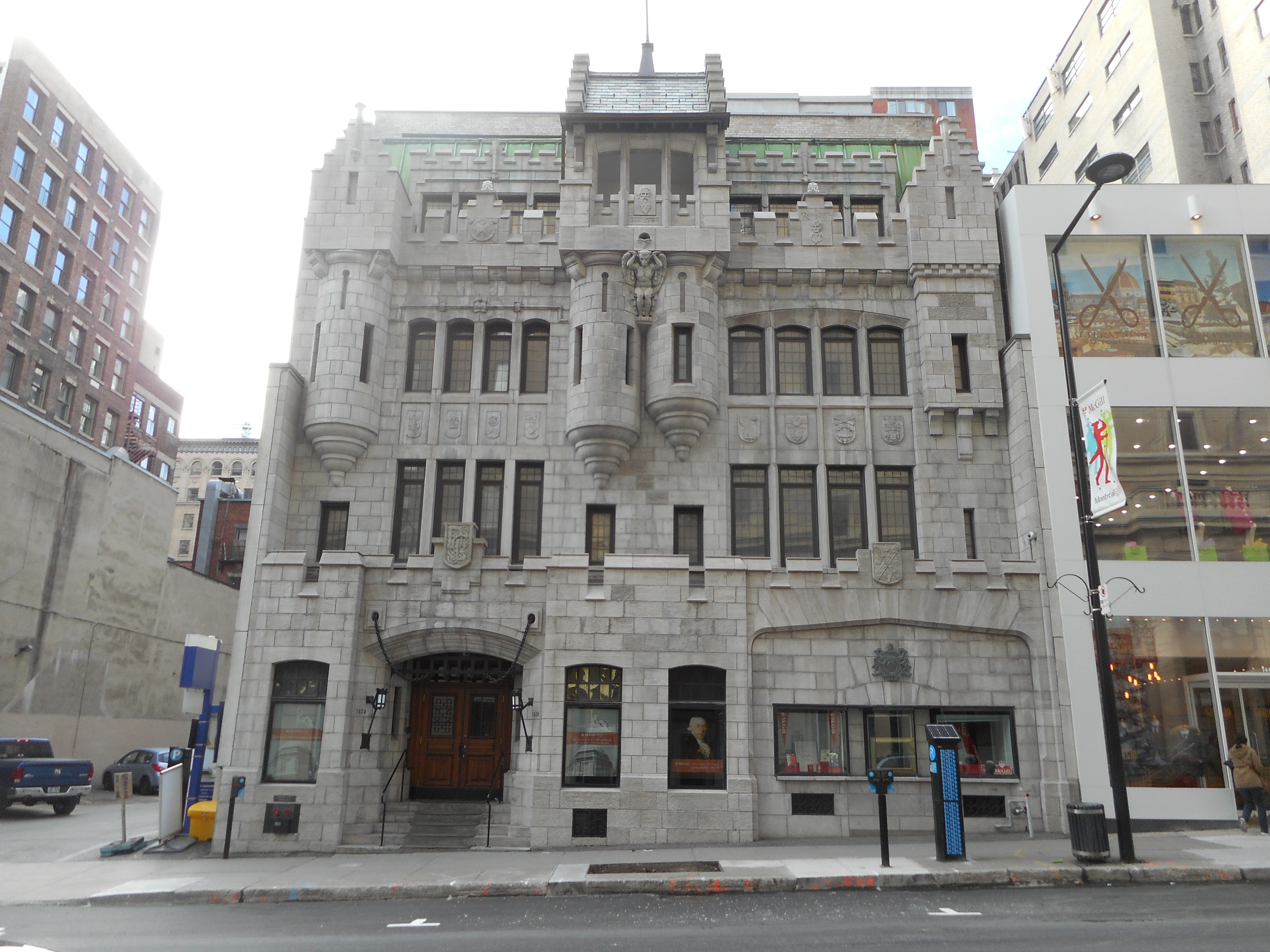
Martlet House at 1430 Peel Street

Martlet House (formerly Seagram House) is a Scottish baronial style building at 1430 Peel Street in Downtown Montreal, Quebec. The building was completed in 1928 by architect David Jerome Spence, with additions in 1931, 1947 and 1955.

Previously the Montreal headquarters of Seagram Company Ltd., the building was donated to McGill University by Vivendi Universal, which had acquired the property in 2002 after its merger with Seagram. The university spent $1.5 million renovating the site in order to house its Development and Alumni Relations department, which moved there in 2004.

== Previous Martlet Houses ==
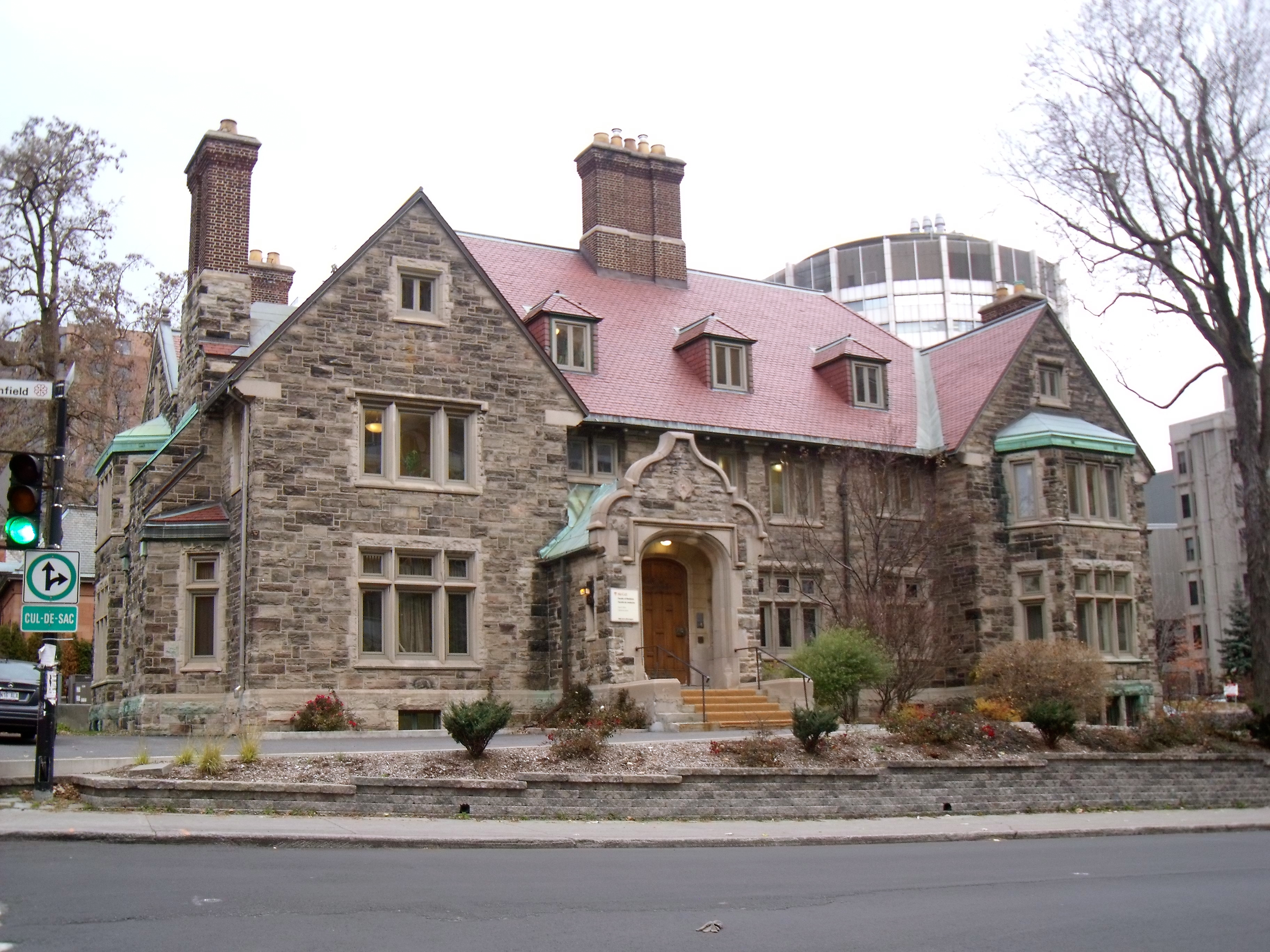
The previous Martlet House at 3605 De la Montagne Street

Prior to 2004, the Martlet House designation had been applied to two properties in succession: one on University Street, followed by a move in 1971 to a stone mansion at 3605 De la Montagne Street that was designed by architect Robert Findlay. The house was built in 1925 for Alice Graham Hallward, the wife of Bernard Marsham Hallward and the only child of Canadian newspaper magnate Hugh Graham, 1st Baron Atholstan.
