= Francis Badgley (doctor) =

Canadian physician (1807–1863)

Francis Badgley (14 June 1807 – 24 December 1863) was the son of Francis Badgley (1767–1841), a merchant with business connections to the London, England, fur trade. The senior Badgley had made his start in Canada as a partner of Richard Dobie. His brother, William became a judge and attorney general for Canada East.

Francis was licensed to practice in 1826 and, after receiving his diploma from the Royal College of Physicians of Edinburgh and his MD from the University of Edinburgh in 1829, he finished his studies in Europe. He then practiced in England until returning to Montreal in 1843. Upon his return, he concentrated mainly on teaching medicine and in 1843 was instrumental in setting up the Montreal School of Medicine and Surgery, later to become the Université de Montréal Faculty of Medicine. He was also involved in setting up the College of Physicians and Surgeons of Lower Canada. This organization received government recognition in 1847.

Francis Badgley continued to teach medicine in Canada until 1860. At that time he was on the medical faculty of the University of Trinity College in Toronto. He returned to England that year because of his wife's health and remained there in practice until his death.
