= Robert Findlay (architect) =

Canadian architect

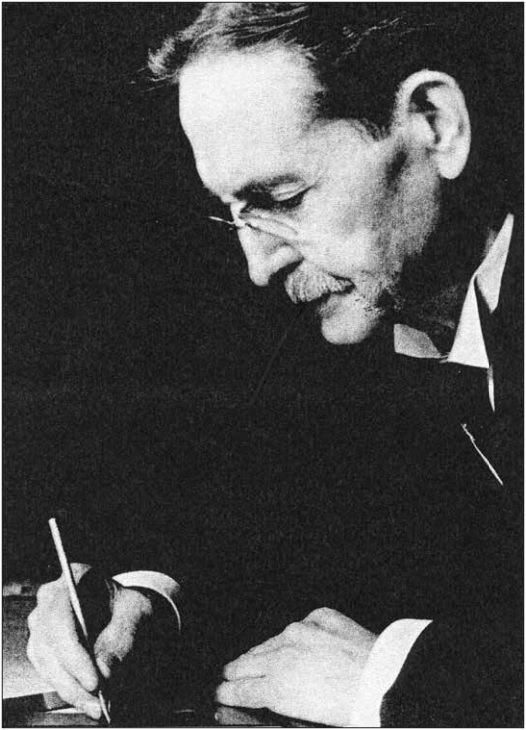
- Born: 1859; Inverness, Scotland
- Died: 1951 (aged 91–92)
- Occupation: Architect
- Buildings: Westmount City Hall

Robert Findlay (1859–1951) was a Scottish-born Canadian architect. He was born in Inverness, Scotland, and moved to Montreal in 1885. He won the competition to expand the first Sun Life Building and was the architect for that project, which he began in 1890. The Sun Life company left that building for the current Sun Life Building in 1913.

== Career ==
Findlay cultivated an extensive practice, working in later years with his son, Frank. He designed several mansions in the Golden Square Mile and a number of other large private houses in Westmount, as well as Westmount City Hall. His private clients included four members of the Molson family, Robert Wilson Reford, F.E. Meredith, Charles Meredith, J.K.L. Ross, Sir Edward Beatty, Charles Francis Smithers, A.A. Bronfman and Sir Mortimer Davis.

Many of the Golden Square Mile homes that he designed were later purchased by McGill University, including the Sir Mortimer Davis House (now Purvis Hall). Findlay designed the Calvary Congregational Church (1911) in Westmount, located at the intersection of Greene Street and Dorchester Boulevard (demolished in 1961). He also designed the base for Montreal's Lion of Belfort monument in Dorchester Square.

Findlay was responsible for the design of Mull Hall (1916) on Lakeshore Road, later known as Stewart Hall, and for the Alice Graham Hallward House (1925) at 3605 Mountain Street, known from 1971 to 2004 as McGill's Martlet House (not to be confused with McGill's current Martlet House at 1430 Peel Street, which was built by David Jerome Spence in 1928).

== Gallery ==
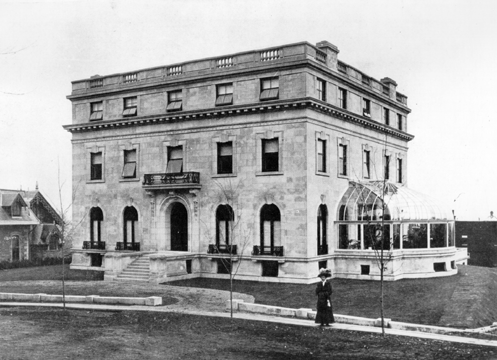
Sir Mortimer Davis House (1900)

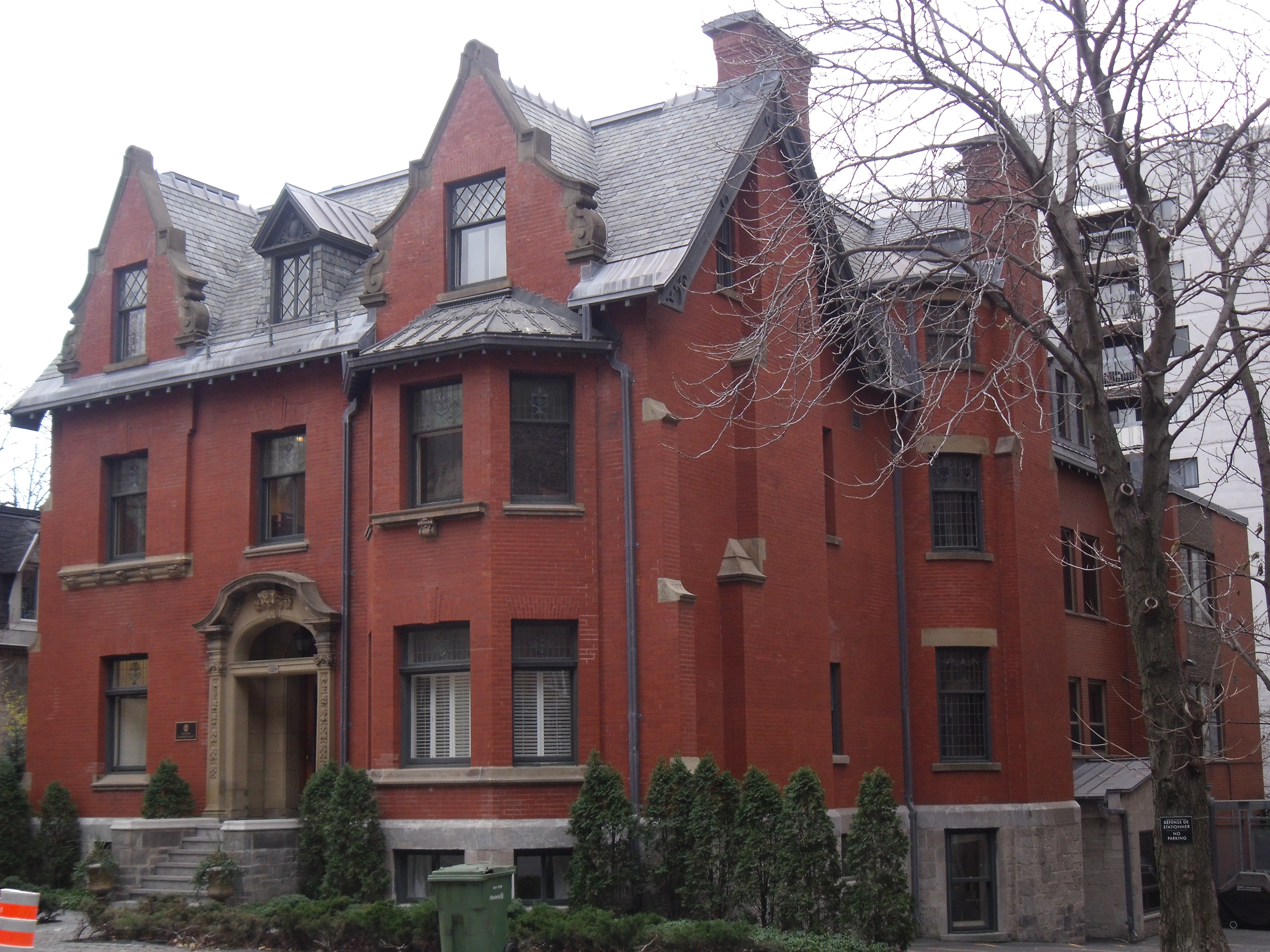
Harold Stearns House (1904)

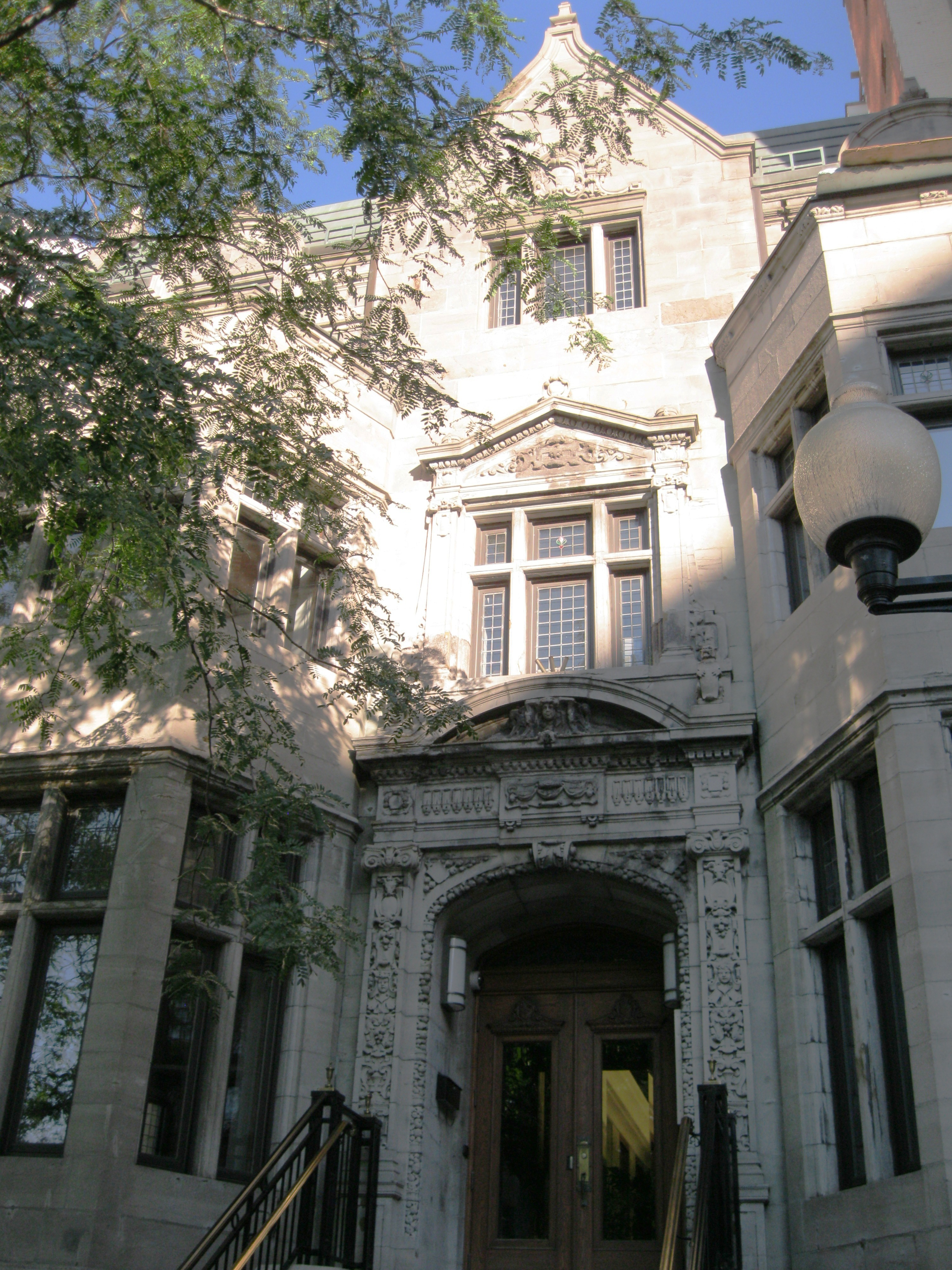
William A. Molson House (1905)

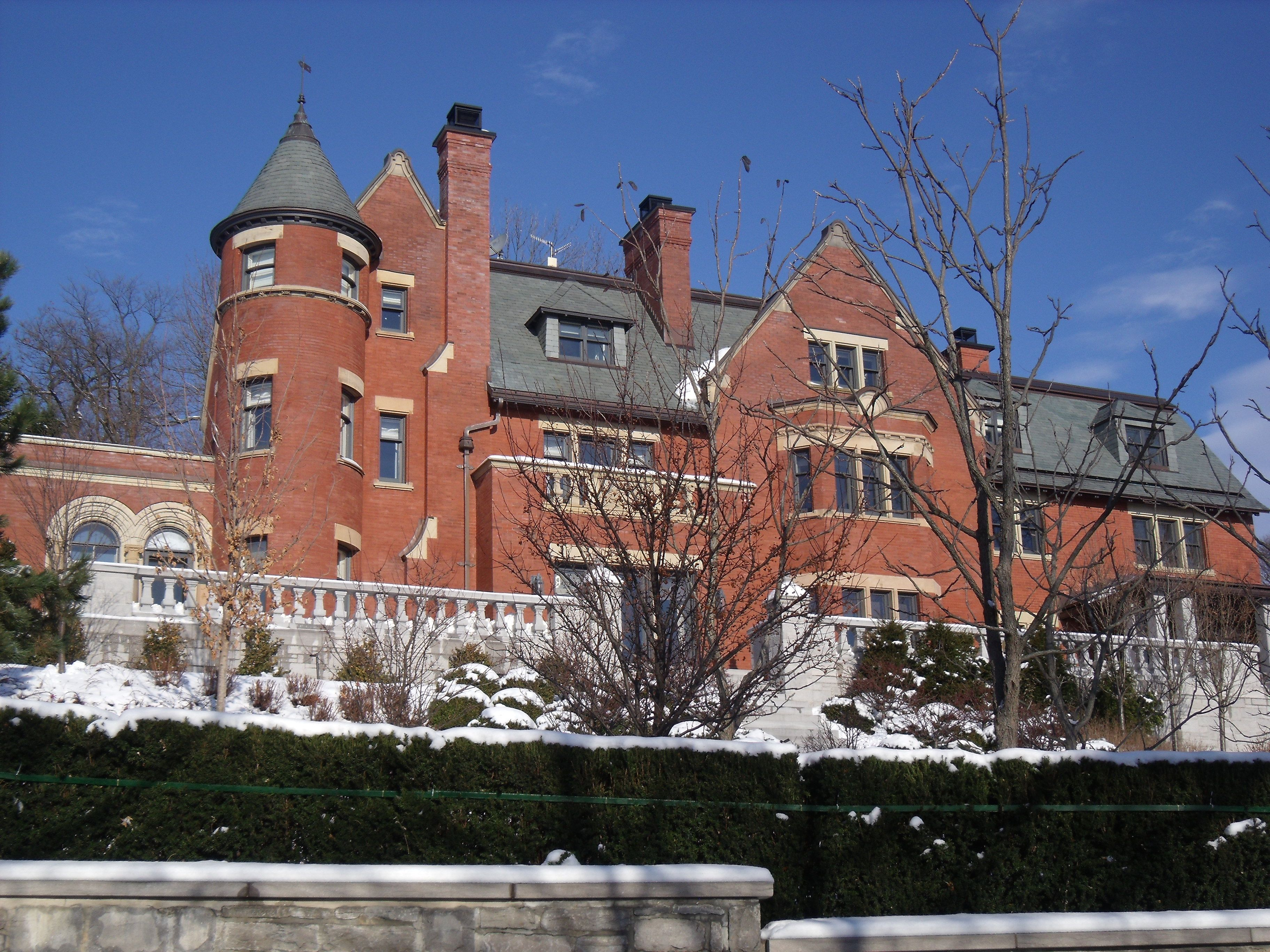
George Sumner House (1906)

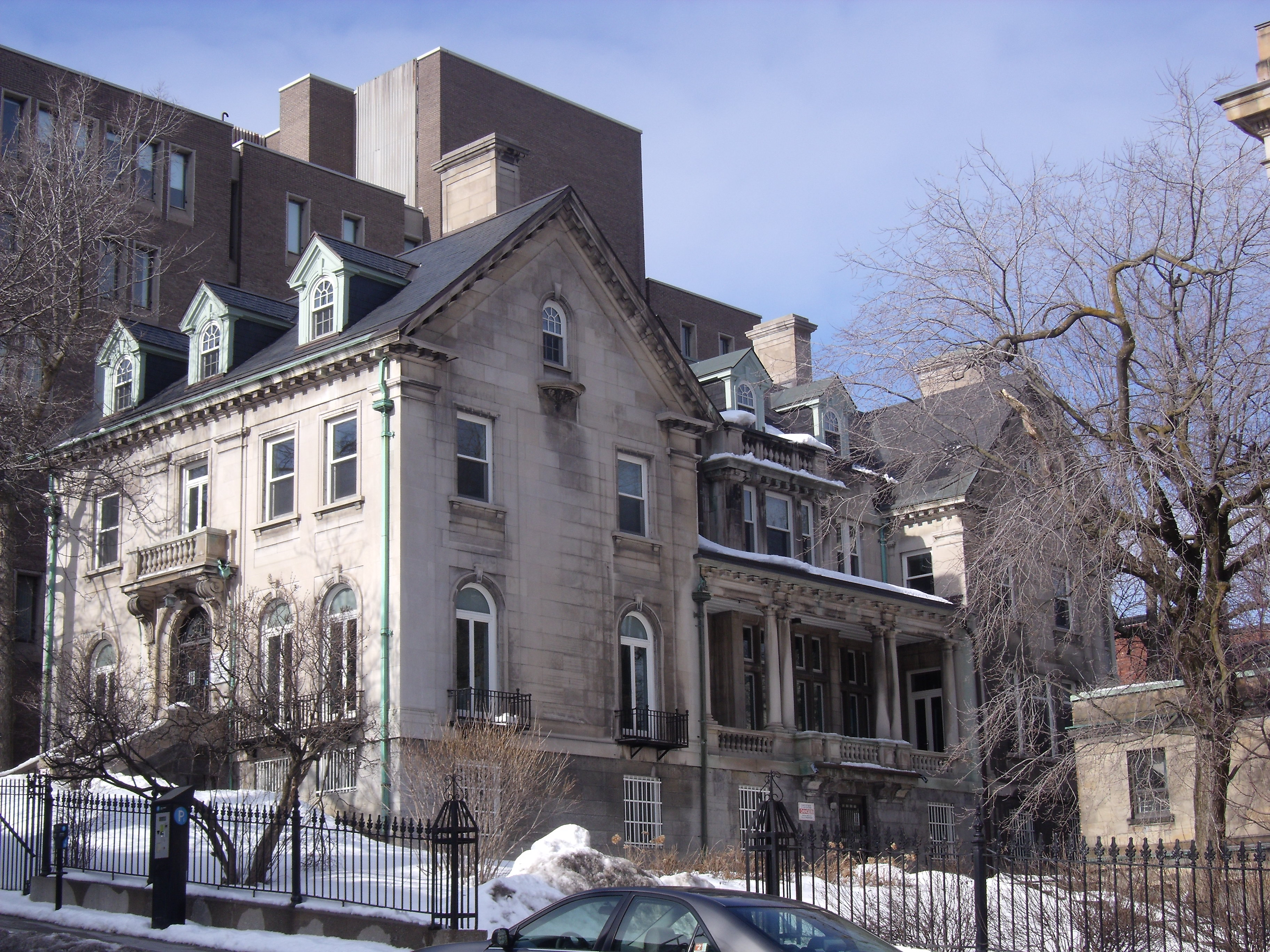
Charlotte R. Harrisson House (1912)

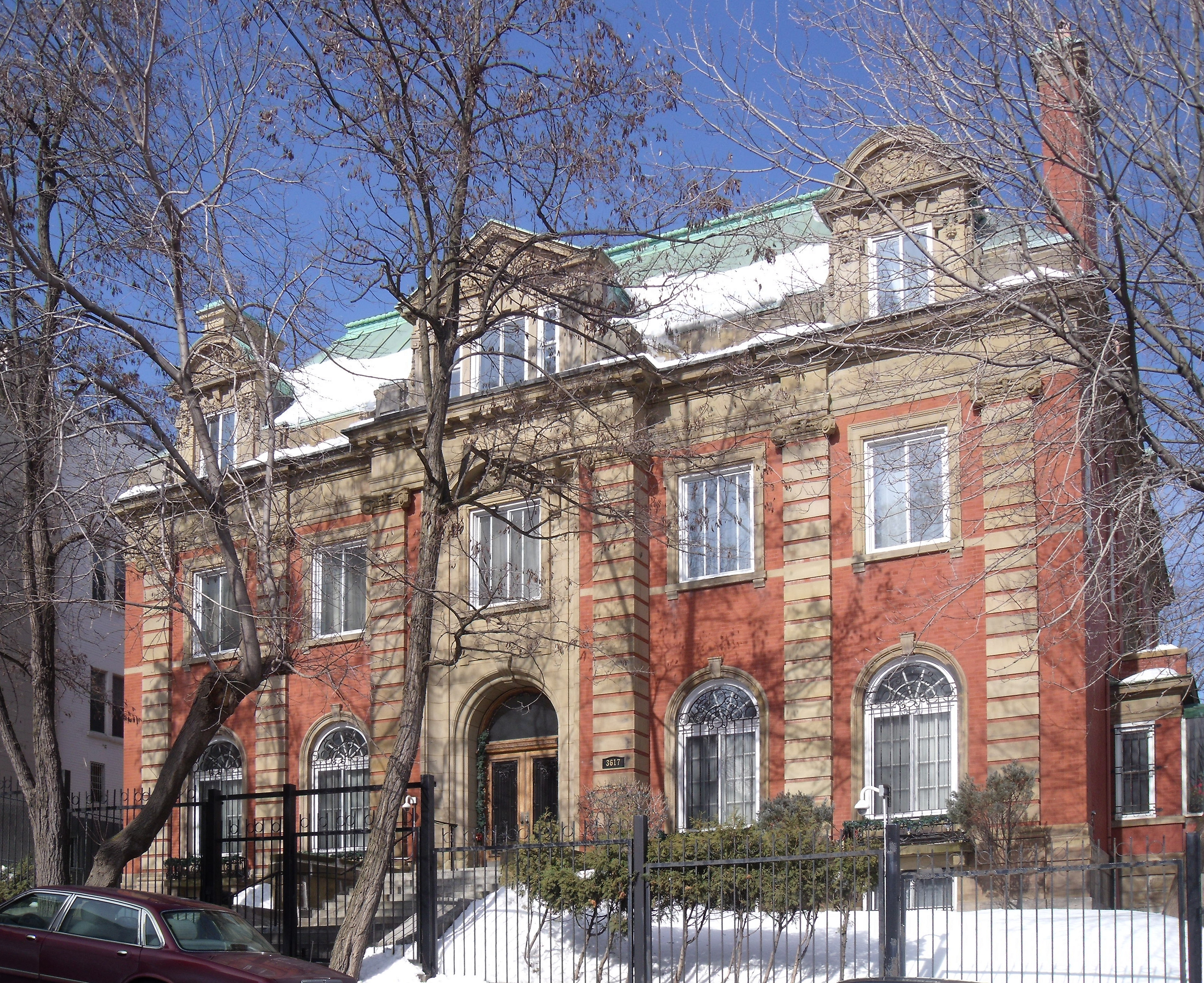
Herbert Molson House (1912)

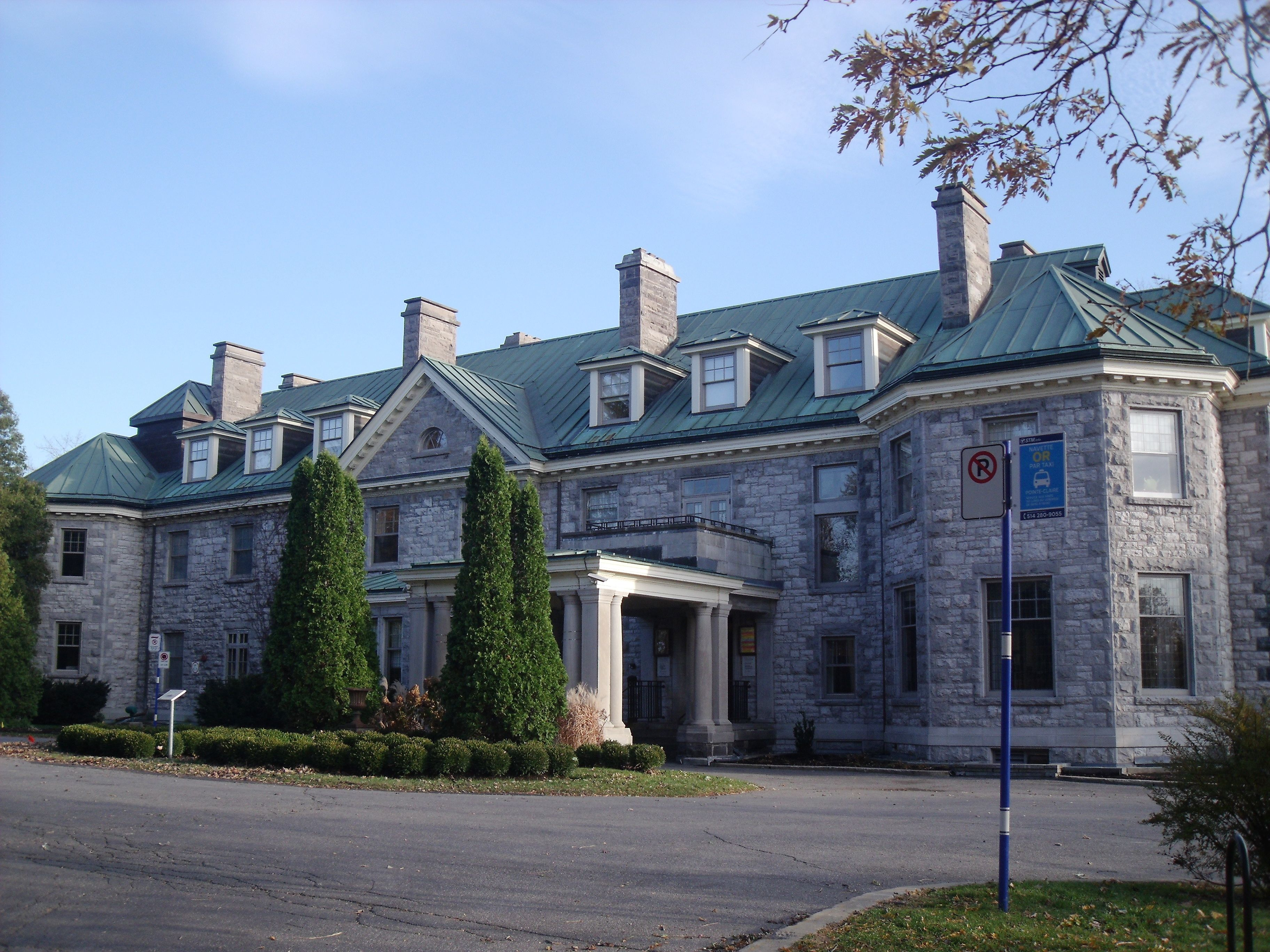
Stewart Hall (1916)

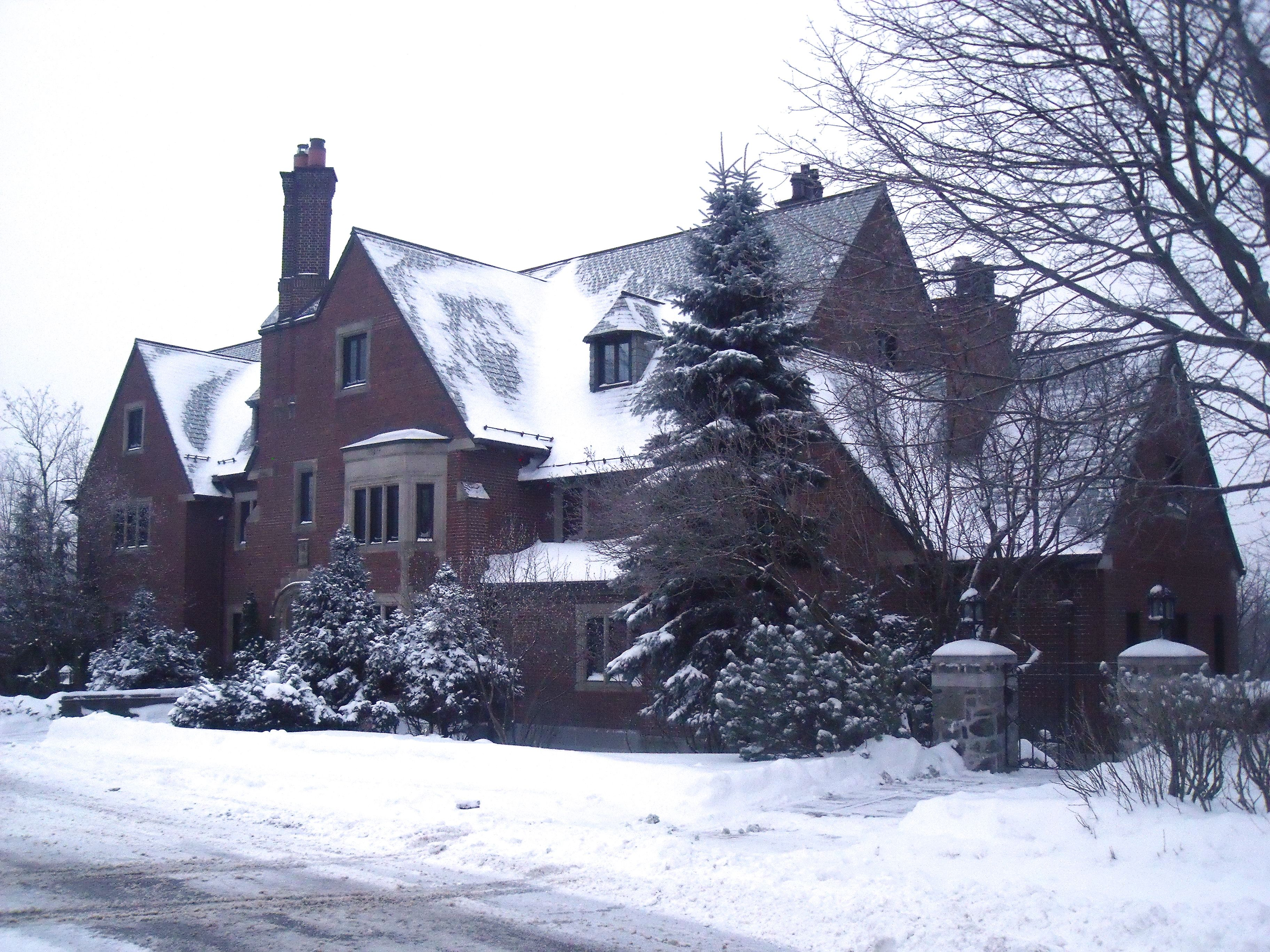
Harrieth Frothingham House (1916)

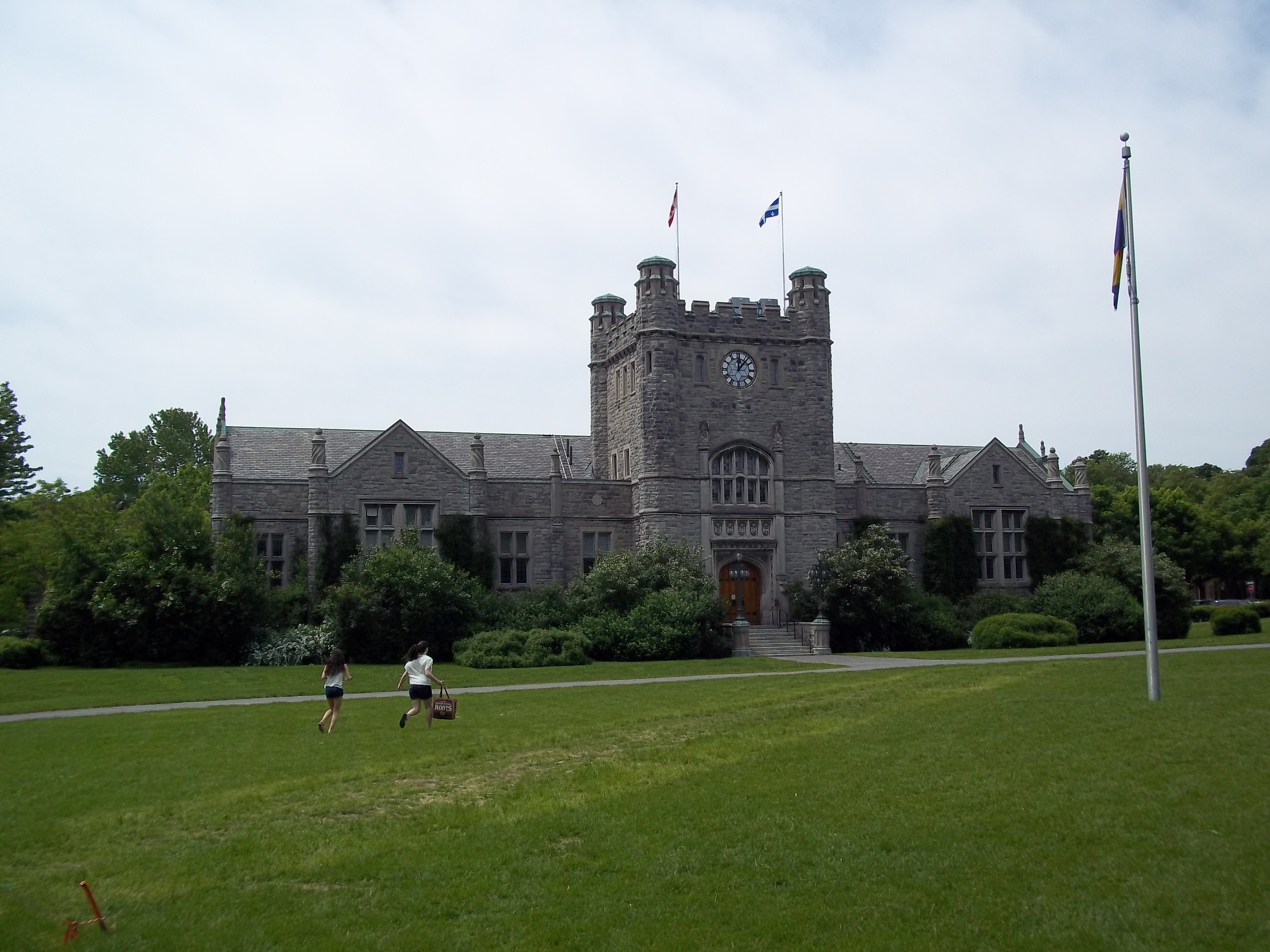
Westmount City Hall (1922)

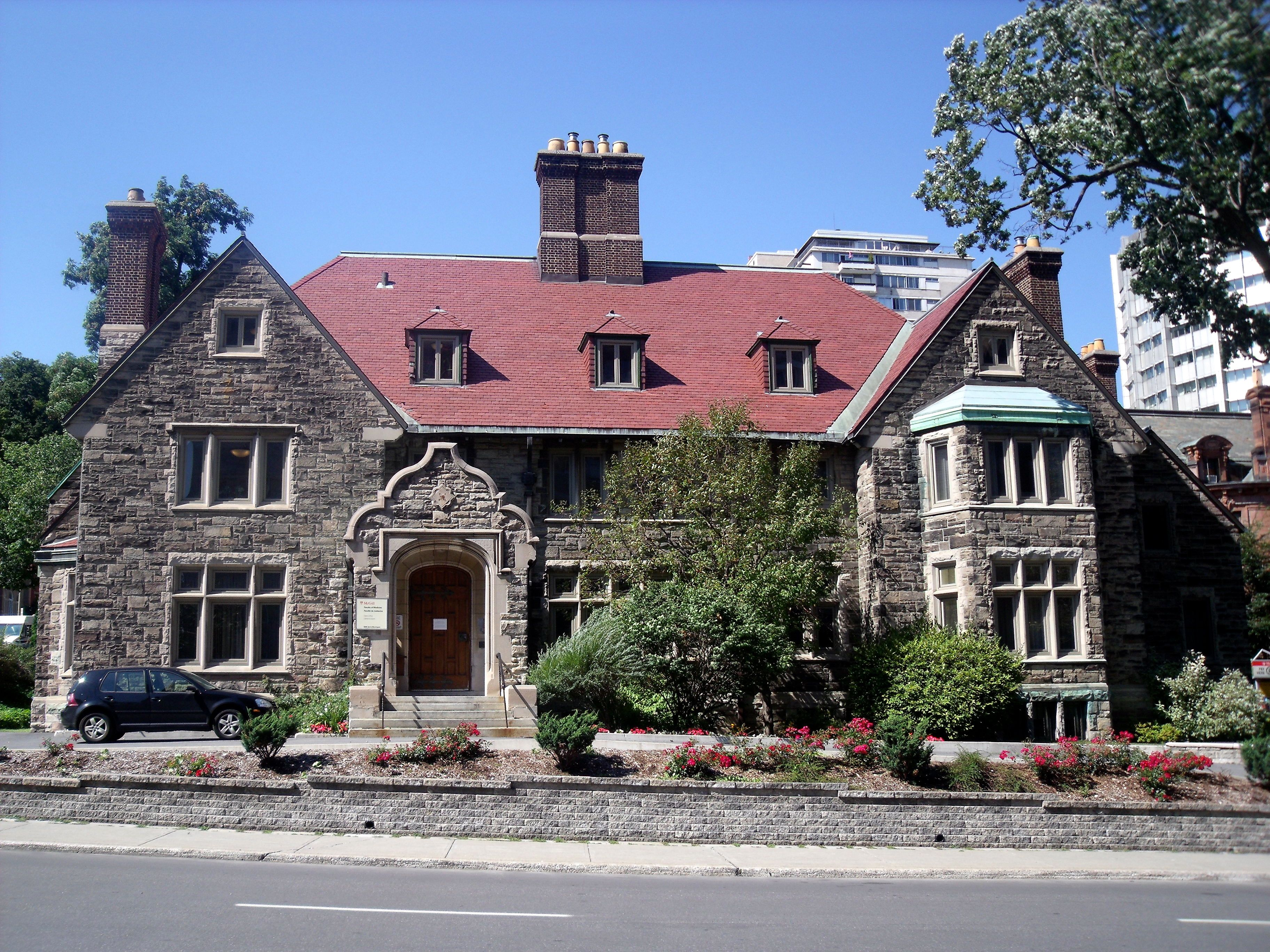
Alice Graham Hallward House (1925)

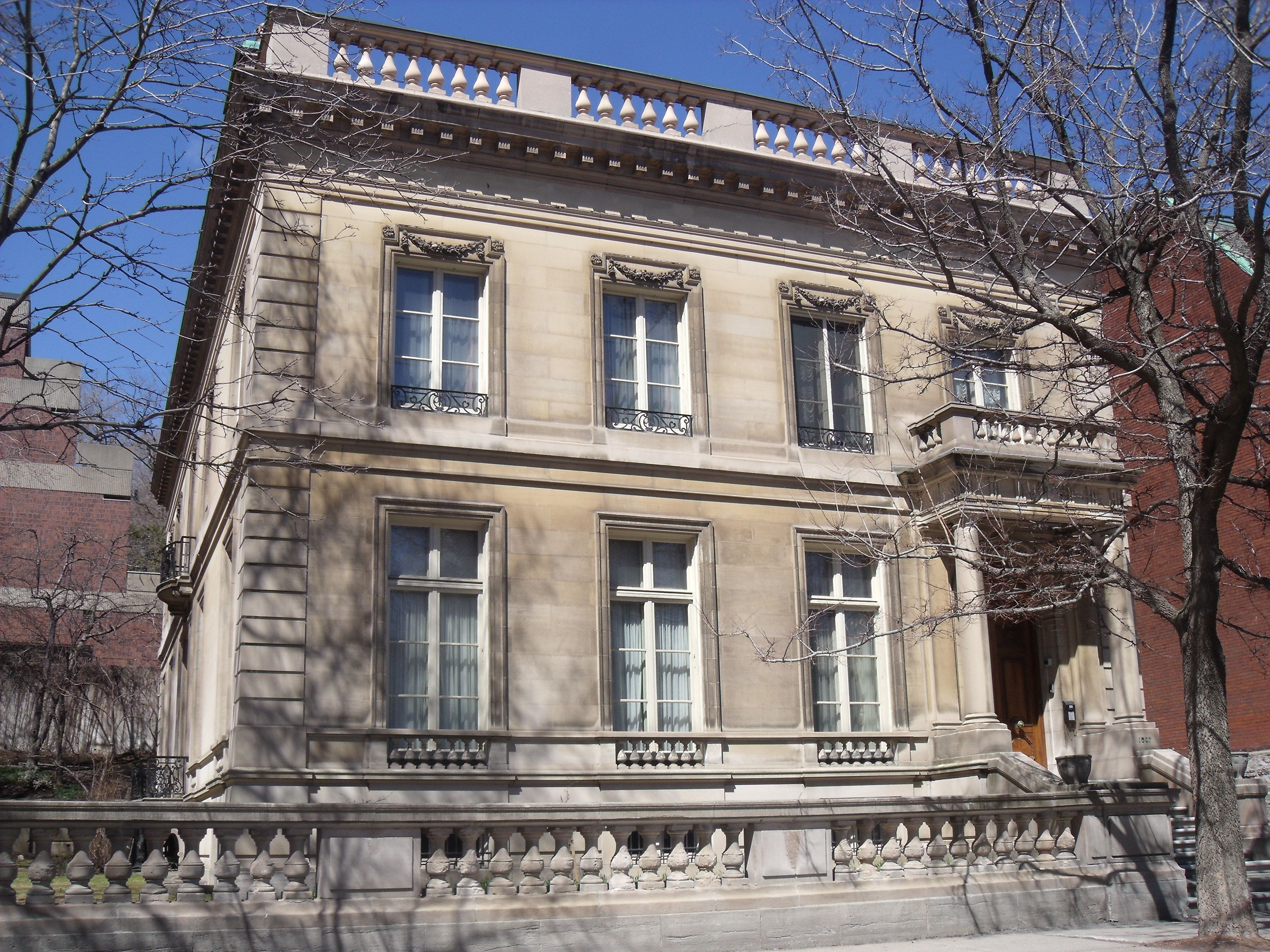
Joseph-Aldéric Raymond House (1929)

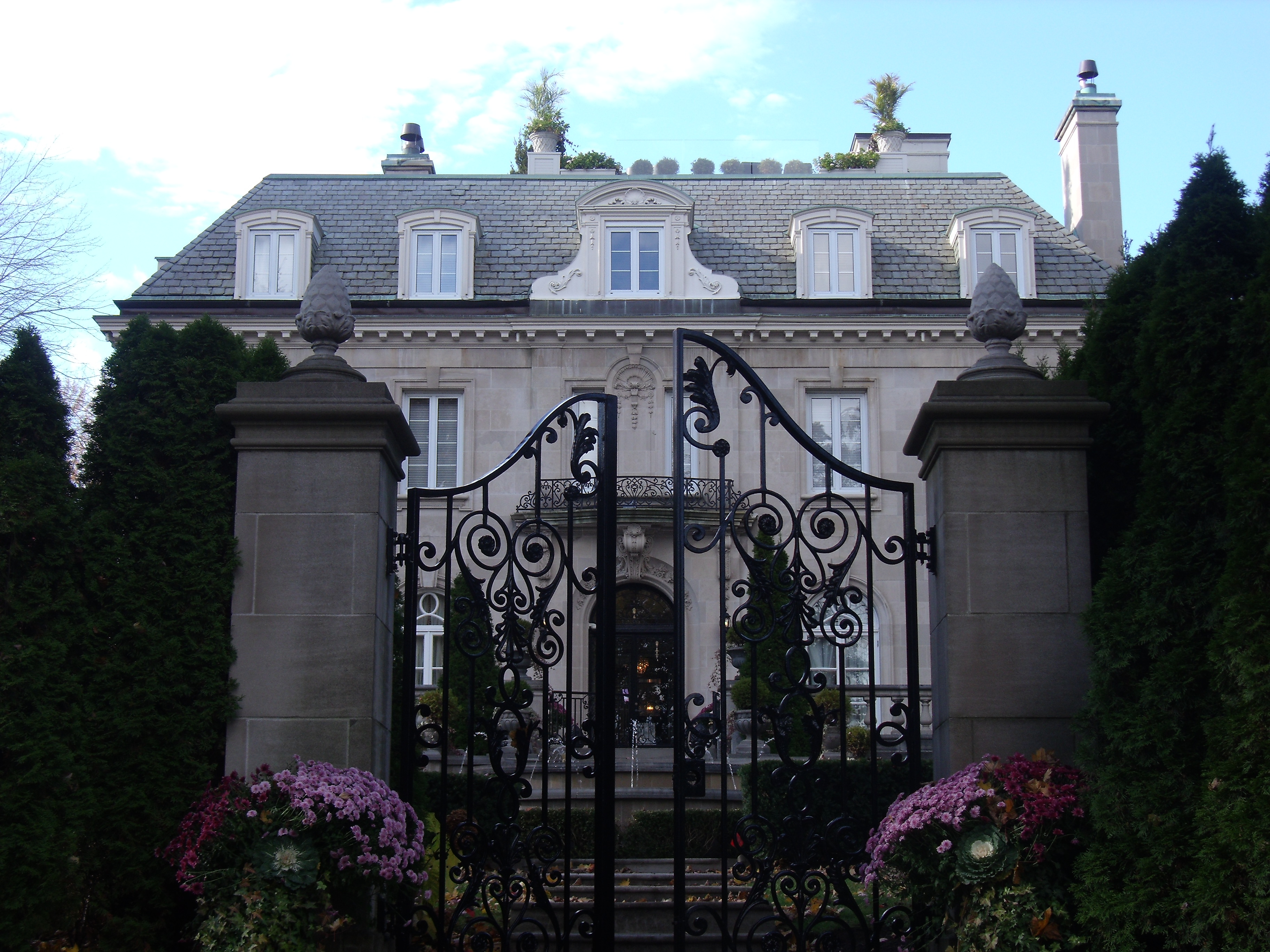
Abe Bronfman House (1931)
