= Jean-Louis Besnard =

Jean-Louis Besnard (dit Carignant) (November 22, 1734 – December 3, 1791) was a merchant trader based out of Montreal, Province of Quebec (now Canada).

Jean-Louis Besnard was in the fur trade by 1770. He was outfitting voyageurs and, in turn, relying on suppliers like Pierre Foretier. He was also in the milling business with a flour mill at Lachine, Quebec, and owned two enslaved black people. Through a series of events he was forced to declare bankruptcy in September 1776. His dealings with the Montreal merchant Richard Dobie were called into question at that time. Creditors of Besnard sued Dobie because of these transaction. A legal and political melee ensued with the Governor, Sir Guy Carleton, dismissing Chief Justice Peter Livius.

Besnard ended up turning over all his assets to his creditors. Although officially considered dishonest, he was allowed to continue in the fur trade and pursue other occupations. He ended up in important positions at Fort Michilimackinac (present day Mackinaw City, Michigan) and died of drowning in Lake Michigan. His failures in business were probably a result of the nature of the fur trade at that time. Control of the trade was increasingly held a few powerful merchants. They, in turn, created the North West Company in 1783.
