= Bar of Montreal =

- Founded: 1849
- Type: Bar association
- Legal status: active
- Purpose: advocate and public voice, educator and network
- Headquarters: Montreal, Quebec, Canada
- Region served: Montreal, Quebec, Canada
- Official language: English; French
- Parent organization: Bar of Quebec
- Website: www.barreaudemontreal.qc.ca

The Bar of Montreal (French: Barreau de Montréal) is the section of the Bar of Quebec for lawyers in the city of Montreal, Quebec, Canada. It has it beginnings in 1693 when, as a Royal Province of the French colonial empire, Canadien lawyers first tried to obtain official recognition but were refused by Governor General of New France Louis de Buade de Frontenac who upheld the 1678 edict by the Sovereign Council that denied recognition of the legal profession.

For nearly a century, the Canadien lawyers would not be given recognition until after the Battle of the Plains of Abraham they became British colonial subjects. In the new British Province of Quebec, in 1765 Governor James Murray authorized the creation of the "Community of Lawyers" (Communauté des avocats) which granted commissions to its members that allowed them to practice law in the triple capacity of lawyer, notary and land surveyor. The precursor of the present-day Bar of Montreal, the Community of Lawyers adopted the first-ever code of ethics and conduct.

The Bar of Montreal became an independent corporation alongside the Bar of Lower Canada in 1849 through the Act to incorporate the Bar of Lower Canada (11-12 Vict. (1849), c.46.).
