= Richard Dobie =

Richard Dobie (1731 – March 23, 1805) was a Scottish merchant who came to Canada in 1760 and became actively involved in the fur trade around Lake Superior and the other Great Lakes. Much of his trade was to the south of these lakes which was a well established trade zone.

In 1767 Dobie established a partnership with Benjamin Frobisher, who travelled to the trading posts and wintered there, while Dobie remained in Montreal. They mounted at least one attempt at the northwest fur trade in partnership but most of Dobies trade efforts continued with various partners, one of whom was Francis Badgley, in the Great Lakes area.

Although heavily involved in the fur trade, Dobie was also active in any number of non fur trade enterprises. He accumulated a large fortune in these endeavors and was an important member of the Montreal community.

== See also ==
- Jean-Louis Besnard
