= Borden Ladner Gervais =

Canadian law firm

Borden Ladner Gervais LLP
- No. of offices: 5
- Offices: Ottawa, Toronto, Montreal, Calgary and Vancouver
- No. of attorneys: 850+
- Major practice areas: General practice
- Date founded: 1823
- Company type: Limited liability partnership
- Website: blg.com

Borden Ladner Gervais LLP (abbreviated as BLG) is a full-service law firm in Canada with almost 900 lawyers, intellectual property agents and other professionals. With two hundred years of history going back to the 1823 founding of McMaster Gervais, it has offices in Toronto, Montréal, Vancouver, Ottawa, and Calgary. BLG is governed by a partnership board composed of partners from across Canada. Sean Weir served as the firm's first National Managing Partner until 2018, and was succeeded in the position by John Murphy of the Montréal office.

BLG was ranked in 16 practice areas in the 2024 edition of Chambers Global, and is known for its practices in disputes, corporate/M&A, international trade, energy, environment, labour and employment, healthcare, shipping, infrastructure and construction, and procurement law. BLG was named a leading law firm in The Canadian Legal Lexpert® Directory, with 238 lawyers recognized as leaders.

Former Supreme Court of Canada Justice Louise Arbour joined the firm in 2014. Supreme Court of Canada Justice Thomas Cromwell, who authored the landmark Bhasin v Hrynew decision on the common law duty of good faith, joined the firm in 2017. In 2023, Jacques R. Fournier, retired Chief Justice of the Superior Court of Québec, joined the firm's Disputes group and in 2024, former Justice of the Court of Appeal of Alberta Marina Paperny joined as Senior Counsel.

Over the years, the firm has produced a Prime Ministers, an Attorney General, appellate court justices, law school deans, an ambassador to the United States, and directors of numerous national corporations. It has represented many of Canada's most well-known blue chip companies including Hudson's Bay Co., Canadian Pacific Railway, Bank of Montreal, Prudential Life, Alcan, Royal Trust, Bell Canada, General Electric, DuPont and Dominion Textiles. The firm was also counsel to the Prince of Wales.

== History ==
On March 1, 2000, the law firms of McMaster Gervais of Montreal, Borden & Elliot of Toronto, Ladner Downs of Vancouver, Howard Mackie of Calgary, and Scott & Aylen of Ottawa, merged to create BLG.

In July 2002, BLG strengthened its corporate securities practice with the acquisition of the Calgary-based law firm Armstrong Perkins Hudson LLP, which was the largest securities boutique in Western Canada at the time.

In 2003, BLG added lawyers from Armstrong & Associates, a Waterloo Region intellectual property law boutique. In 2008, the firm of Shortt Hanbridge Richardson and Welch joined BLG. By the end of 2014, BLG had closed its Waterloo office.

== Founding firms ==
The Toronto firm Borden & Elliot was founded on January 20, 1936, by lawyers Henry Borden and Beverly Vallack Elliot. Henry, at the outbreak of World War II, was appointed to the War Supply Board in Ottawa and, in 1942, was appointed chairman of the War Time Industries Control Board. Over the following three decades, the firm experienced rapid expansion resulting in many name changes. Eventually, the firm's name was changed back to Borden & Elliot in 1973. At the time of the merger in 2000, Borden & Elliot was a full-service firm with one of the largest litigation practices in the country, and employed 668 people including more than 230 professionals.

The Montréal firm McMaster Gervais was founded in 1823 when the Honourable William Badgley opened his law practice at the age of 22. Badgley went on to become Attorney General for Lower Canada in 1847, and in 1853 became the first dean of McGill University Faculty of Law, Canada's oldest law school. Badgley's first partner at the firm, John Abbott, became Prime Minister of Canada in 1891. At the time of the merger, McMaster Gervais employed 280 people, including 110 professionals. McMaster Gervais was a result of a 1998 merger of McMaster Meighen and Mackenzie Gervais.

The Vancouver firm Ladner Downs was founded in 1911. A few years earlier, in 1909, Leon Ladner was the President of the Vancouver Law Students Society that first proposed opening a provincial law school in Vancouver, a proposal that came to fruition 36 years later when the University of British Columbia Faculty of Law opened in 1945. Leon's son, Thomas Ladner, built and expanded Ladner Downs into one of the leading law firms in British Columbia. At the time of the merger, the firm employed 318 people, including 110 professionals. Kim Campbell, Canada's first female prime minister, practiced at Ladner Downs prior to the firm's merger.

The fully bilingual Ottawa firm Scott & Aylen was founded in 1952. At the time of the merger, the firm employed 168 people, including 62 professionals. The firm employed lawyers, patent agents and trademark agents. Scott & Aylen co-founder Cuthbert Scott's son, David W. Scott (the first non-American to be elected President of the American College of Trial Lawyers), continues to practice at BLG's Ottawa office today and represents the fourth successive generation of the Scott family to practice law in the Ottawa area. The other co-founder, John A. Aylen Q.C. practised with the firm until he was 89 years old; his son, John G. Aylen Q.C. recently retired from BLG at the age of 86. John G. Aylen's son, David Aylen, is also a lawyer who practised IP with Scott & Aylen for 15 years until he joined another firm in 1998. David Aylen is now a global intellectual property specialist in Russia.

The Calgary law firm Howard, Mackie was founded in 1888 by William L. Bernard, QC, and was one of the largest in Western Canada. In 1993, led by Doug Mitchell, Howard, Mackie established the Howard, Mackie Awards (which were later renamed the BLG Awards). At the time of the merger, the firm employed 150 people, including 66 professionals.

== Awards and accolades ==
In 2024, BLG was named one of Canada's Best Diversity Employers for the sixth consecutive year, as well as a Canadian Lawyer 5-Star Pro Bono Firm for the second year in a row. At the 2024 Benchmark Litigation awards, BLG was Insurance Law Firm of the Year, and recognized for Arbitration Litigator of the Year as well as Construction Litigator of the Year.

The firm supports a variety of activities by providing pro bono legal services, fundraising and volunteer programs through its ESG@BLG initiative.

== Notable lawyers ==
- Louise Arbour
- Thomas Cromwell
- Douglas Mitchell
