= William Badgley =

Canadian judge

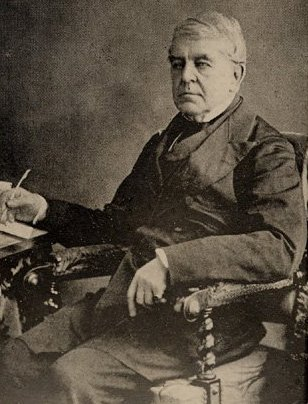

Member of the Legislative Assembly of the Province of Canada
- In office 1847–1854

Personal details
- Born: 27 March 1801 Montreal, Lower Canada
- Died: 24 December 1888 (aged 87) Montreal, Quebec
- Relations: Francis Badgley, father

William Badgley (27 March 1801 – 24 December 1888) was a Canadian born in Lower Canada, educated there, and admitted to the Lower Canadian bar in 1823. He became a judge and attorney general for Canada East.

He was also the founder of a law firm now known as the Montreal office of Borden Ladner Gervais LLP.

From 1855 to 1857 he was professor of law at McGill College and was the first dean of the Faculty of Law.

He was the son of Francis Badgley (1767–1841), a merchant with family business connections to the London fur trade. He was a brother to Francis and Elizabeth, wife of William Molson.
