= Francis Badgley (merchant) =

Canadian politician (1767–1841)

Francis Badgley (26 March 1767 – 7 October 1841) was a Canadian merchant, politician, and newspaper editor.

== Early life ==
He was born in London, England and immigrated to Canada in about 1785.

== Career ==
He lived in Montreal and, in 1788, entered a partnership with Richard Dobie who was active in the fur trade. This partnership lasted until 1792, when his diaries indicate that Badgley travelled to Grand Portage, Minnesota with the fur brigade and conducted a survey for the North West Company.

Badgley was elected to the Legislative Assembly of Lower Canada for Montreal East in 1800. This was a two-member riding and both he and Pierre-Louis Panet secured 178 votes. He was a supporter of the English party during his four years and did not run for re-election in 1804.
