= Bedo (disambiguation) =

Bedo may refer to:

== People ==
- Bedo Aeddren, Welsh poet
- Bedo Brwynllys, Welsh poet
- Bedo Hafesp, Welsh poet
- Bedo Phylip Bach, Welsh poet

== Places ==
- Bedo, village in Haiti
- Bedő, village in Hungary

== See also ==
- Beddoe
- Beddoes
- Nicolas Bedos, French actor and comedian
