= Beddoe =

Beddoe is a surname of Welsh origin. It originates from Bettws or Betws (Welsh pronunciation: [ˈbɛtʊs]), a Welsh name that is derived from the Anglo-Saxon Old English bed-hus—i.e. a bead-house: a house of prayer, or oratory. At the time of the British Census of 1881, its frequency was highest in Pembrokeshire (over 65 times the national average), followed by Cambridgeshire, Shropshire, Glamorgan, Monmouthshire, Herefordshire, Carmarthenshire, Staffordshire, Cardiganshire and Warwickshire.

Notable people with the surname include:

- Martin Beddoe (born 1955), British judge
- Alan Beddoe (1893–1975), Canadian artist, consultant in heraldry, and founder of the Heraldry Society of Canada
- Clive Beddoe (born 1947), founding shareholder and chairman of the board of directors of WestJet Airlines
- Dan Beddoe (1863–1937), Welsh tenor
- Don Beddoe (1903–1991), American character actor
- John Beddoe (1826–1911), British ethnologist
- Valerie Beddoe (born 1960), Australian diver

== Fictional characters ==
- Philo Beddoe, a character played by Clint Eastwood in the films Every Which Way But Loose and Any Which Way You Can

== See also ==
- David Rowe-Beddoe, Baron Rowe-Beddoe, British politician and member of the House of Lords
- Beddoe Rees, British architect and politician
- Beddoe–Rose Family Cemetery, New York State
- Bedo (disambiguation)
- Beddoes
