= Ed Sims =

Edward Sims is a New Zealand businessman who served as president and CEO of WestJet Airlines between 2018 and 2021. He started with the company on May 28, 2017, as the executive vice president of commercial. Sims has a history of senior positions with airlines such as Air New Zealand, TUI Airways, Thomas Cook Airlines, and travel companies such as Virgin Travel Group. Sims’ most recent position before WestJet was the CEO of Airways New Zealand, Air New Zealand's air navigation service provider

Sims began his work in the travel industry in the United Kingdom, but has also worked in European and Australasian travel markets.

== WestJet (2017 to 2021) ==
Sims joined WestJet as the executive vice president of commercial on May 28, 2017. He was promoted to CEO on March 7, 2018, after the CEO at the time, Gregg Saretsky unexpectedly stepped down. He worked on both strategic direction and day-to-day operations for the company. Sims retired from his position at WestJet in 2021. He continues to serve as an advisor to WestJet's parent company, Onex.

== Airways New Zealand (2011 to 2017) ==
Sims served as the CEO of Airways New Zealand, an air traffic service provider, from July 4, 2011, to May 26, 2017.

== Air New Zealand (2001 to 2010) ==
Sims served for ten years with Air New Zealand. He began in 2001 as vice-president of retail, then in 2002 he was promoted to the vice-president of marketing and alliances. His longest serving role with the company began in December 2003 where he led the international wide-body business. In this role he had the responsibility of the international cabin crew, long haul fleet induction and refurbishment programmes.
