= WestJet =

Airline of Canada

WestJet Airlines Limited

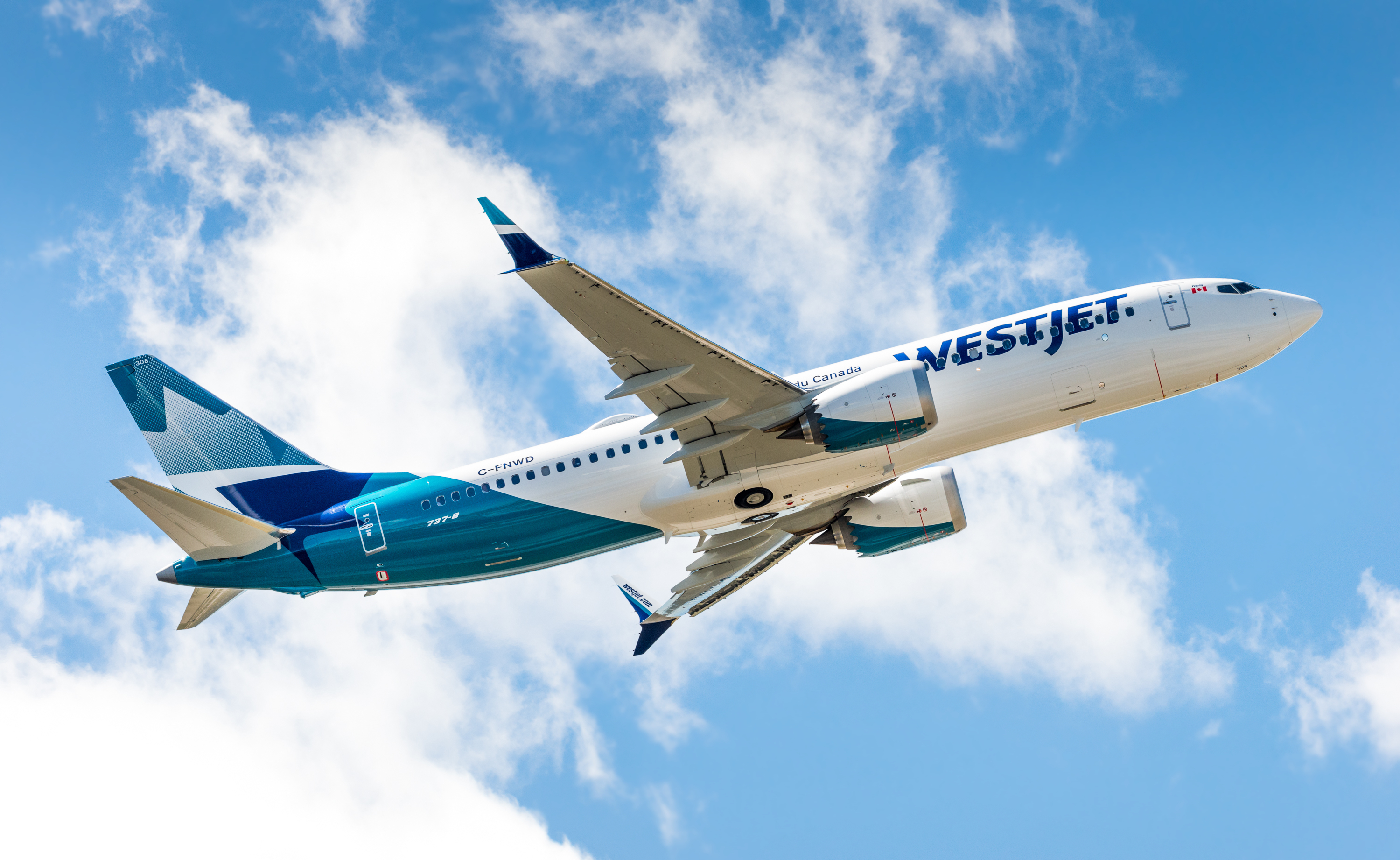
- WestJet Boeing 737 MAX 8
IATA	ICAO	Call sign
WS	WJA	WESTJET
- Founded: June 27, 1994; 32 years ago
- Commenced operations: February 29, 1996; 30 years ago
- AOC #: Canada 8993; United States WJ0F768F
- Hubs: Calgary; Toronto–Pearson; Vancouver
- Focus cities: Edmonton; Halifax; Montréal–Trudeau; Winnipeg
- Frequent-flyer program: WestJet Rewards
- Subsidiaries: Sunwing Vacations Group; WestJet Cargo; WestJet Encore
- Fleet size: 169
- Destinations: 104
- Parent company: Onex Corporation (75%); Delta Air Lines (12.7%); Korean Air (10%); Air France–KLM (2.3%)
- Headquarters: Calgary, Alberta, Canada
- Key people: Alexis von Hoensbroech (president & CEO)
- Founders: Clive Beddoe; Tim Morgan; David Neeleman; Mark Hill; Don Bell
- Employees: 14,000 (May 2024)
- Website: westjet.com

WestJet is a Canadian airline headquartered in Calgary, Alberta. Founded in 1994, WestJet is currently the second-largest airline in Canada, and is the eighth largest airline in North America by frequency. It began operations in 1996 with 220 employees, three aircraft, and five destinations, and was launched as a low-cost alternative to the country's major airlines.

WestJet operates scheduled, charter, and cargo air service, transporting more than 25 million passengers per year in over 100 destinations across North America, Caribbean, Europe, Asia, and Central America. WestJet utilizes Calgary International Airport as its exclusive global connecting hub, with Toronto Pearson International Airport being a strategic secondary hub. The airline has two direct subsidiaries: WestJet Encore, which operates the De Havilland Canada Dash 8, the Q400NextGen, on routes in Western Canada, and WestJet Cargo, which operates three cargo aircraft, all , which were previously used as WestJet passenger aircraft and converted for cargo use.

== History ==
=== 1994–1999: First flights ===
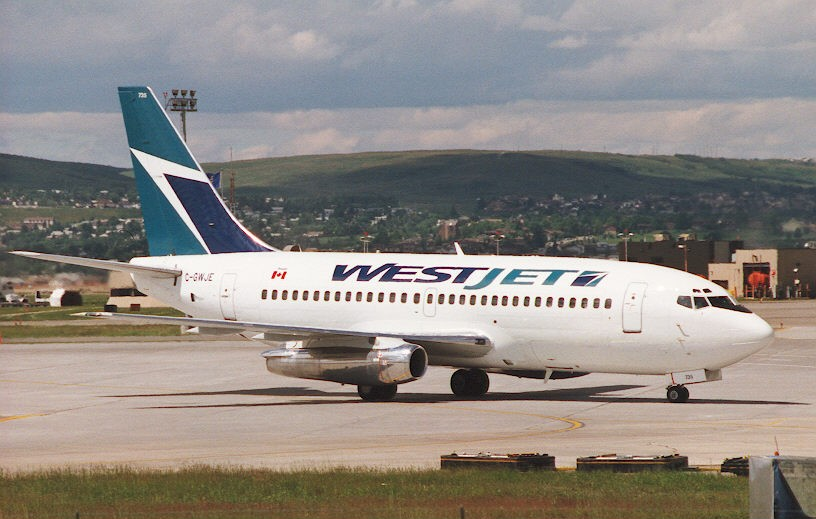
One of WestJet's Boeing 737-200s at Calgary International Airport, July 1998

WestJet was founded on June 27, 1994, by Clive Beddoe, David Neeleman, Mark Hill, Tim Morgan, and Donald Bell. WestJet was based on the low-cost carrier business model pioneered by Southwest Airlines and Morris Air in the United States. Its original routes were all located in Western Canada, which gave the airline its name.

On February 29, 1996, the first WestJet flight operated by a Boeing 737-200 departed. Initially, the airline served Calgary, Edmonton, Kelowna, Vancouver and Winnipeg with a fleet of three second-hand Boeing 737-200s and 225 employees. By the end of that same year, the company had added Regina, Saskatoon and Victoria to its network.

In mid September 1996, WestJet's fleet was grounded due to a disagreement with Transport Canada over maintenance schedule requirements. The airline suspended all service for two weeks before it resumed flights.

In early 1999, Clive Beddoe stepped down as WestJet's CEO and was replaced by former Air Ontario executive Steve Smith. In July 1999, WestJet made its initial public offering of stock at 2.5 million shares, opening at $10 per share. The same year, the cities of Thunder Bay, Grande Prairie, and Prince George were added to WestJet's route map.

In 2000, WestJet CEO Steve Smith was released from WestJet after 18 months in the position, due to differences in management style. Smith went on to head rival Air Canada's low-cost subsidiary Zip. After Smith's departure, Clive Beddoe again became CEO of the company, a position he held until July 2007. By this time, WestJet was the third largest airline in Canada, behind Canadian Airlines International Inc. and Air Canada.

=== 2000–2003: Domestic expansion ===
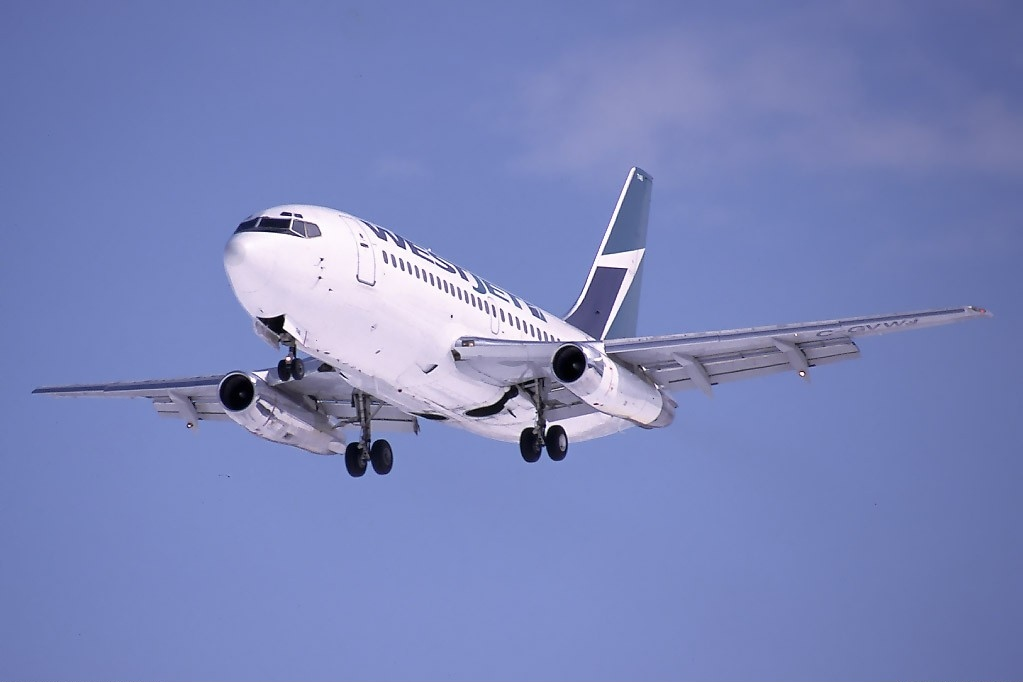
WestJet Boeing 737-200, 2001. The airline began service into Eastern Canada in 2001

Due to restructuring in the Canadian airline industry resulting from Air Canada's takeover of Canadian Airlines in 2000, WestJet expanded into Eastern Canada, beginning service to the cities of Hamilton and Ottawa, Ontario, and Moncton, New Brunswick. The airline selected John C. Munro Hamilton International Airport to be the focus of its Eastern Canadian operations and its main connection point in Eastern Canada.

In 2001, WestJet's expansion continued with routes to Comox, along with Sault Ste. Marie, Sudbury, Ontario, Thompson and Brandon, Manitoba; however, service to each of these four cities has since been withdrawn. Service to Brandon, Manitoba, and Sudbury, Ontario, was subsequently resumed by WestJet's wholly owned subsidiary, WestJet Encore.

In 2002, the airline also added another two new Eastern Canadian destinations: the Ontario cities of London and Toronto. In April 2003, WestJet added Windsor, Montreal, Halifax, St. John's and Gander.

WestJet entered into a two-year agreement with Air Transat in August 2003 whereby WestJet aircraft would be filled by Transat's two main tour operators, World of Vacations and Transat Holidays. These chartered flights operated largely to destinations in Mexico and the Caribbean and the planes were operated by WestJet crews. This agreement between WestJet and Air Transat was amicably terminated in February 2009.

In 2004, rival airline Air Canada accused WestJet of industrial espionage and filed a civil suit against WestJet in Ontario Superior Court. Air Canada accused WestJet of accessing Air Canada confidential information via a private website to gain a business advantage. On May 29, 2006, WestJet admitted to the charges levelled by Air Canada and agreed to pay C$5.5 million in legal and investigation fees to Air Canada and donate C$10 million to various children's charities in the names of Air Canada and WestJet.

=== 2004–2006: International expansion ===
In January 2004, WestJet announced that it was moving the focus of its Eastern operations from Hamilton to Toronto the following April, fully moving into the lucrative Toronto–Ottawa–Montreal triangle and tripling the total number of its flights out of Toronto Pearson International Airport.

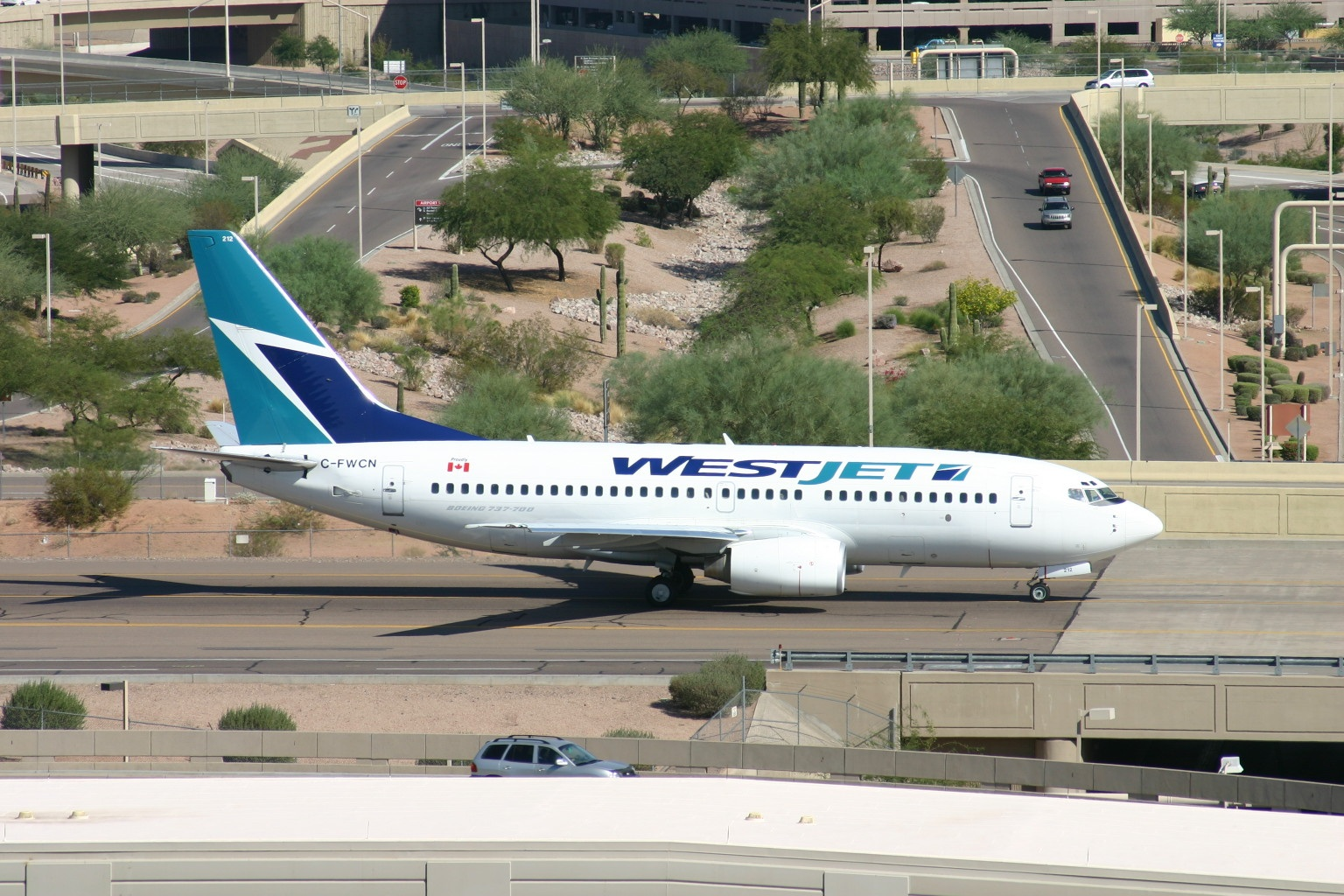
WestJet Boeing 737 Next Generation (737-700) at Phoenix Sky Harbor International Airport, October 2004. WestJet introduced flights to Phoenix and other U.S. cities in 2004.

In 2004, several U.S. destinations were added or announced. These included San Francisco, Los Angeles, Phoenix, Tampa, Fort Lauderdale, Orlando and LaGuardia Airport in New York City. In early 2005, Palm Springs and San Diego were added to the company's list of destinations, while New York–LaGuardia was dropped. In April 2005, it announced new seasonal service to Charlottetown and ceased service to Gander. In fall 2005, Fort Myers and Las Vegas were added to the growing list of destinations.

In late August 2005, WestJet flew to Baton Rouge, Louisiana, transporting members of a Vancouver-based urban search and rescue team to assist with Hurricane Katrina relief efforts.

After rumours and speculation surrounding the implementation of extended-range twin-engine operations (ETOPS), WestJet announced new service to Hawaii from Vancouver on September 20, 2005. In December 2005, the airline began flying from Vancouver to Honolulu and Maui.

WestJet's first scheduled service outside Canada and the United States began in 2006, to Nassau, The Bahamas. This was considered a huge milestone within the company's long-term destination strategy and was a vital goal for future international market presence.

In September 2006, Sean Durfy took over as president of WestJet from founder Clive Beddoe.

On October 26, 2006, WestJet announced that it had its best quarterly profit to date, of C$52.8 million.

=== 2007–2009: Continued growth ===
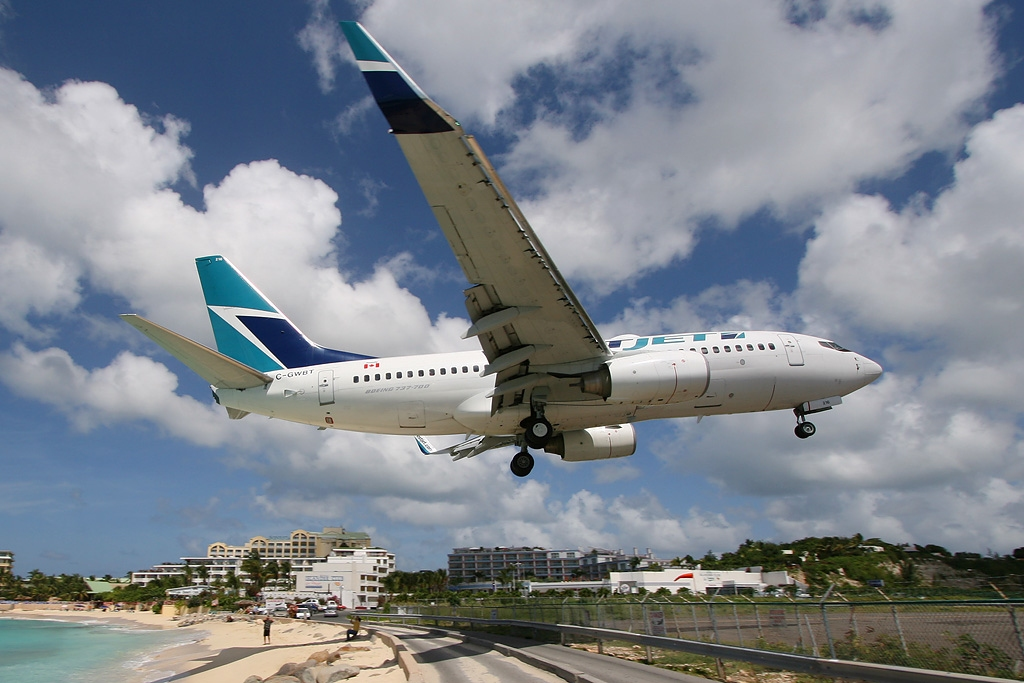
WestJet Boeing 737-700 landing at Princess Juliana International Airport, 2007. WestJet introduced several international seasonal flights that year.

In 2007, WestJet announced that it would begin flights from Deer Lake in Newfoundland, Saint John in New Brunswick and Kitchener-Waterloo in Ontario. In June 2007, WestJet added seven new international seasonal flights to Saint Lucia, Jamaica, the Dominican Republic, Mexico as well as a third Hawaiian destination, Kona.

The same year, WestJet commissioned the construction of a new six-story head office building, next to their existing hangar facility at the Calgary International Airport. The building was constructed following the Leadership in Energy and Environmental Design (LEED) Green Building Rating System, featuring a rainwater retention system and geothermal heating. The first employees moved in during the first quarter of 2009, and the building officially opened the following May. The WestJet Campus building was certified as LEED Gold standard in October 2011.

In May 2008, WestJet launched daily non-stop service to Quebec City. The next month, WestJet commenced seasonal service between Calgary and New York City via Newark Liberty International Airport. In May 2009, the airline launched new seasonal service to the cities of Yellowknife, Northwest Territories and Sydney, Nova Scotia; service to Yellowknife was later extended through the winter of 2009–10.

In the first decade of the 2000s, WestJet made significant gains in domestic market share against Air Canada. In 2000, it held only 7% to Air Canada's 77%, though by the end of 2009 WestJet had risen to 38%, against Air Canada's 55%.

In late April 2009, WestJet temporarily suspended service to several of its destinations in Mexico due to the outbreak of influenza A (H1N1) in the country. The suspension of service to Cabo San Lucas, Mazatlán and Puerto Vallarta lasted from early May until mid June, with seasonal service to Cancún being restored the following fall.

In July 2009, WestJet announced 11 new international destinations for its winter schedule. These included expanded service to the United States, to Atlantic City, New Jersey, Lihue (Kauai), Hawaii and Miami, Florida. New Caribbean destinations included Providenciales, in the Turks and Caicos Islands; Sint Maarten, Netherlands Antilles; Freeport, The Bahamas; as well as the cities of Varadero, Holguín and Cayo Coco in Cuba. Ixtapa and Cozumel were also added to the list of destinations served in Mexico.

In November 2009, WestJet announced service to the British island territory of Bermuda, which commenced in May 2010. WestJet also resumed seasonal service to Windsor, Ontario that same month.

=== 2010–2016: Overseas expansion ===
In March 2010, Sean Durfy resigned from his position as WestJet's CEO, citing personal reasons. He was replaced by Gregg Saretsky, a former executive at Canadian Airlines and Alaska Airlines and previously vice-president of WestJet Vacations and Executive Vice-president of Operations.

In July 2010, WestJet announced service to Santa Clara, Cuba, New Orleans and Grand Cayman bringing the total number of destinations to 71. Service to New Orleans lasted only one season and did not return the next year.

In late 2010, WestJet announced it was wet-leasing a Boeing 757 aircraft to expand service between Calgary to Honolulu and Maui and Edmonton to Maui, on a seasonal basis. Also that year, the Canadian Transportation Agency (CTA), an independent administrative tribunal of the Government of Canada that regulates airlines, found WestJet's baggage policies to be unreasonable and/or contrary to the requirements of the Canada Transportation Act and/or the Air Transport Regulations on several different occasions.

On January 26, 2011, after Air Canada terminated California service, WestJet announced plans to enter service to John Wayne Airport in Orange County, California, from Vancouver and Calgary starting May of that year.

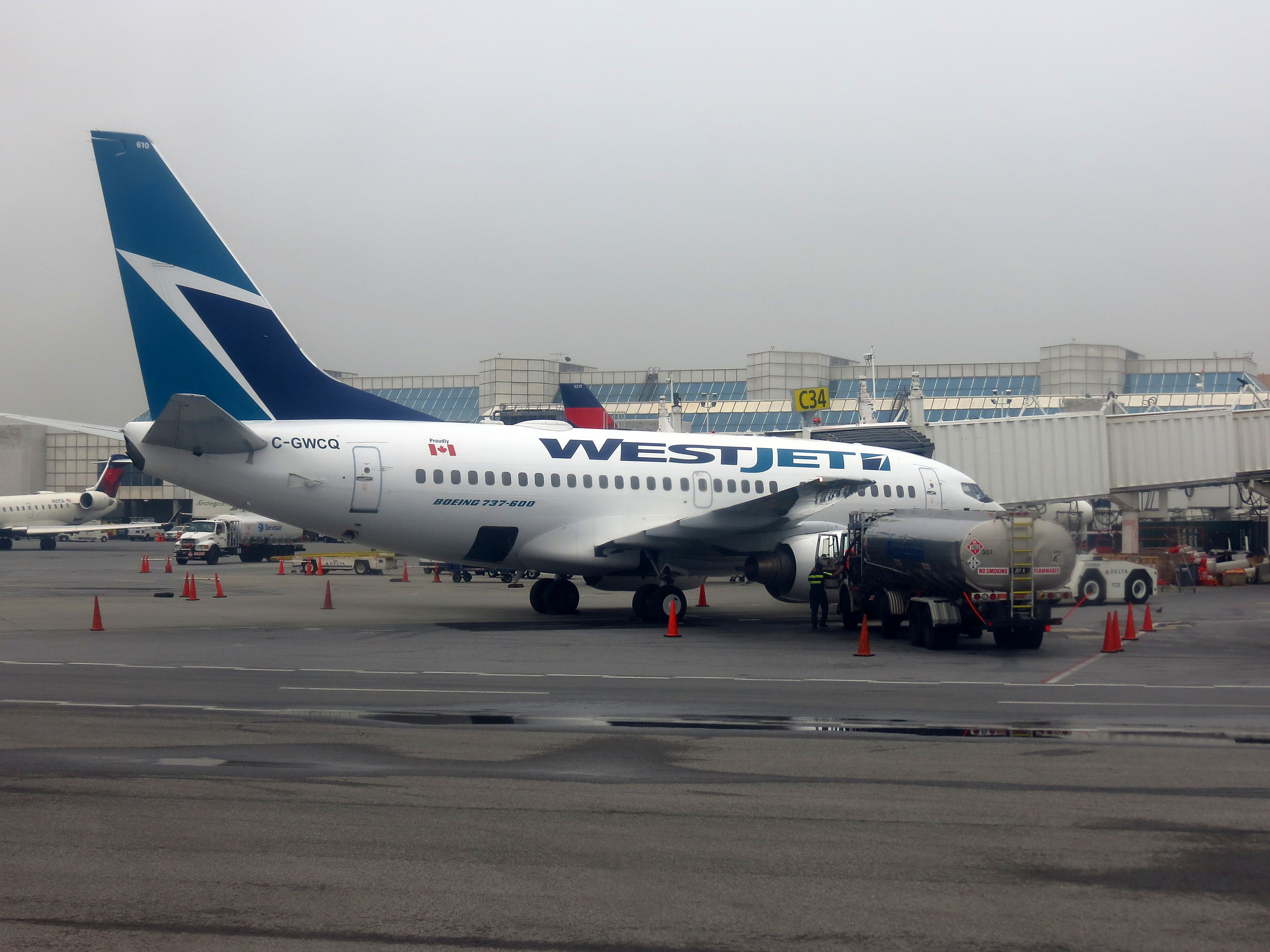
WestJet Boeing 737-600 at LaGuardia Airport, May 2013. Scheduled service to the airport from WestJet began the previous year.

In November 2011, WestJet won an auction for time slots at New York's LaGuardia Airport ushering in a return to service to New York. Details of WestJet's scheduled service to LaGuardia were officially announced in January 2012. From 2012 to 2014, WestJet further expanded into the United States by adding Chicago via O'Hare International Airport, Dallas Fort Worth International Airport, Myrtle Beach International Airport, and New York's John F. Kennedy International Airport.

On November 15, 2013, WestJet announced their first destination in Europe. Seasonal service from St. John's, Newfoundland to Dublin, Ireland, would operate from June to October 2014.

In January 2014, WestJet chartered an Atlas Air Boeing 747-400 to transport stranded passengers and luggage during the 2013 Central and Eastern Canada ice storm. The charter flew from Toronto Pearson International Airport to Calgary International Airport.

On July 7, 2014, WestJet announced that it was in the "advanced stages of sourcing" four wide-body aircraft that would begin flying by the fall of 2015. These would initially serve on the seasonal Alberta-Hawaii routes when WestJet's service agreement with Thomas Cook Airlines—who currently fly these routes on behalf of WestJet—expires in the spring of 2015. WestJet would take delivery of four Boeing 767-300ERs in summer 2015. WestJet took delivery of the first of these aircraft on August 27, 2015.

On June 16, 2015, WestJet announced the launch of service to London's Gatwick Airport on May 6, 2016. It is the carrier's third transatlantic destination after Dublin and Glasgow. The majority of flights to London use the wide-body 767-300ER aircraft. On September 15, 2015, WestJet flights to London direct from Edmonton, St. John's, Vancouver, Winnipeg (seasonal) Calgary and Toronto (year-round) went on sale to the public. During winter months, WestJet continued to serve the seasonal Edmonton – Maui, Calgary – Honolulu, and Calgary – Maui flights with the 767-300ER aircraft before their eventual retirement in 2020.

=== 2017–2019: Transition to full-service carrier ===
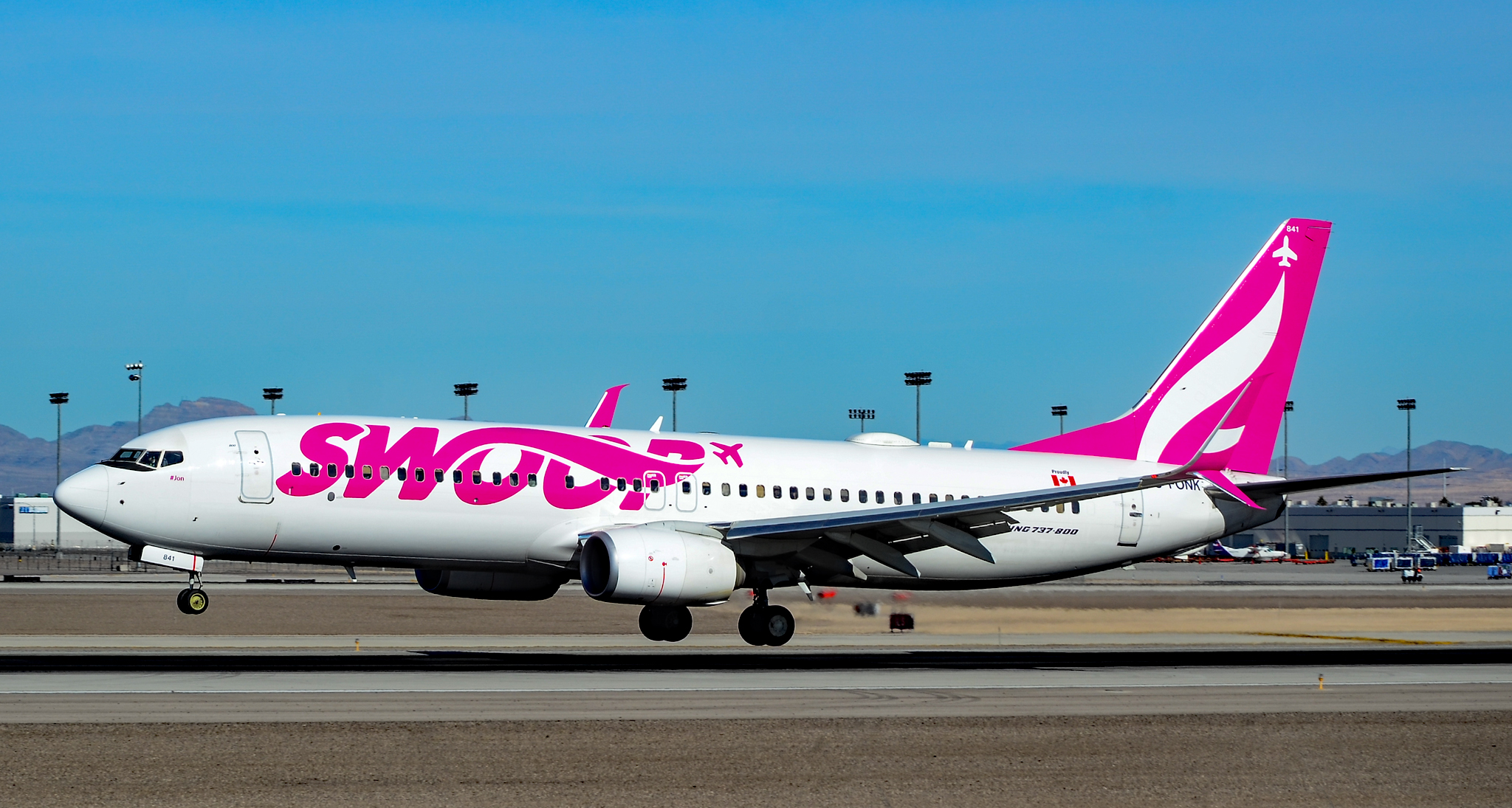
Swoop Boeing 737-800. WestJet established the low-cost subsidiary in 2017, which ceased operations on October 28, 2023, due to its re-integration.

In April 2017, WestJet announced plans to launch an ultra-low-cost carrier in late 2017. The new airline would operate using Boeing 737-800 aircraft, and compete with new entrants to the market, such as Flair Airlines. The launch of the new airline, named Swoop, was delayed until June 2018.

On December 6, 2017, WestJet and Delta Air Lines signed a preliminary memorandum of understanding to extend their current codeshare agreement into a joint venture, pending regulatory and board approval. On July 19, 2018, WestJet and Delta Air Lines signed a definitive ten-year agreement into a joint venture between the two airlines. This joint venture would have served more than 95% of the Canada–U.S. demand. The airlines' current frequent flier programs would also be updated to be more closely aligned, and the airlines will be co-located at key hub airports. However, in November 2020, Delta and WestJet agreed to scrap their plans for a joint venture, as the demands of the United States Department of Transportation were seen "unreasonable and unacceptable" by both airlines.

While announcing an expansion of the senior leadership team on January 11, 2018, Gregg Saretsky reconfirmed the airline's strategic goal to become a global, full-service carrier. On March 8, 2018, the CEO of WestJet, Gregg Saretsky retired. He was replaced by company vice-president, Ed Sims.

On May 8, 2018, WestJet announced that it would be adding the Boeing 787-9 to its fleet. The first aircraft was delivered to the airline in January 2019.

On May 10, 2018, WestJet's unionized pilots voted 91 percent in favour of strike action. The key issue in negotiations was the outsourcing of work to operate Swoop aircraft. On May 25, 2018, WestJet and the Air Line Pilots Association (ALPA) agreed to a settlement process through the Federal Mediation and Conciliation Service.

On May 14, 2018, WestJet announced new 2-2 Premium Economy seating to replace its previous 3-3 seats which had a middle seat blocker. The new seats feature a wider configuration on 737 aircraft. The offering began on its Boeing 737 MAX 8 aircraft in winter 2018, with all 737s being reconfigured by 2020.

On May 31, 2018, WestJet expanded operations into Europe beyond the UK and Ireland, with its inaugural flight from Halifax Stanfield International Airport to Paris' Charles de Gaulle Airport.

The Canadian Union of Public Employees (CUPE) announced its application to the Canadian Government for certification of WestJet's approximately 3,200 flight attendants on July 9, 2018. On July 31, 2018, the Government of Canada via the Canada Industrial Relations Board (CIRB) issued an interim order certifying CUPE as the accredited union for WestJet mainline flight attendants.

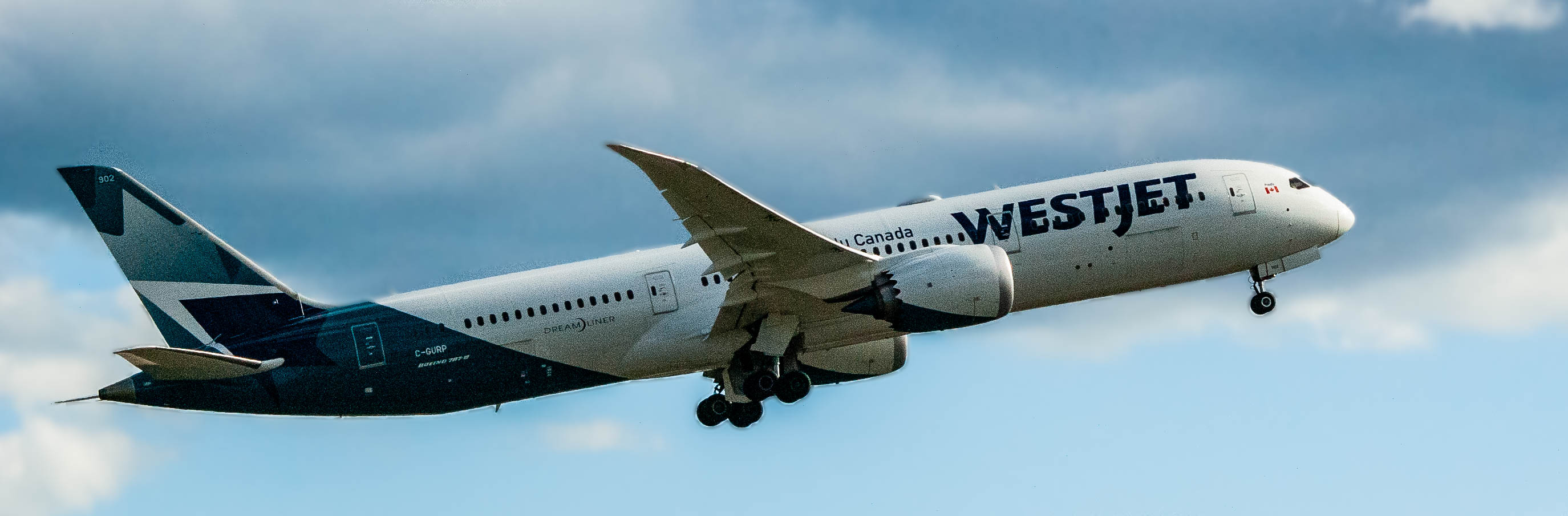
WestJet Boeing 787 Dreamliner (787-9)

On October 12, 2018, WestJet announced its new branding, along with details on the arrival on the Boeing 787-9. WestJet changed its slogan from "Owners Care" to "Love where you're going", announced a new logo (however, that logo was seen back in May with the announcement of the Boeing 787-9 along with its livery), announced the Boeing 787 routes and launch dates, and an overall new brand image. Boeing 787 flights were announced to commence on April 28, 2019, with service from Calgary International Airport to London Gatwick, with service to Paris and Dublin following.

On May 13, 2019, WestJet announced it had reached an agreement to be purchased by Onex Corporation for $5 billion Canadian dollars. At the time, it had 13 Boeing 737 MAX jets in suspended operation, with another 57 of the type ordered from the manufacturer. The purchase price of WestJet was slashed heavily due to the grounding of the MAX aircraft.

=== 2020–2022: COVID-19 pandemic ===
Due to the COVID-19 pandemic response required by world governments including Canada, WestJet faced an unprecedented decline in demand for flights along with the rest of the aviation industry. In addition, there were numerous cases of COVID-19 reported on board WestJet flights.

In March 2020, WestJet suspended all international flights, resulting in widespread workforce adjustments. Approximately half of the employees, totalling 6,900, were laid off on March 24. Subsequently, on April 9, WestJet temporarily rehired 6,400 employees through the federal wage subsidy program (CEWS). Additional layoffs followed, with approximately 8,000 employees between April and June, as part of a restructuring plan, leaving only 4,500 employees on the payroll. Before the pandemic, WestJet employed over 14,000 individuals. By February 2021, the company laid off an additional 250 staff members due to ongoing travel restrictions. However, it is noteworthy that a majority of employees were successfully recalled by February 2022, reflecting the company's efforts in adapting to the challenging circumstances.

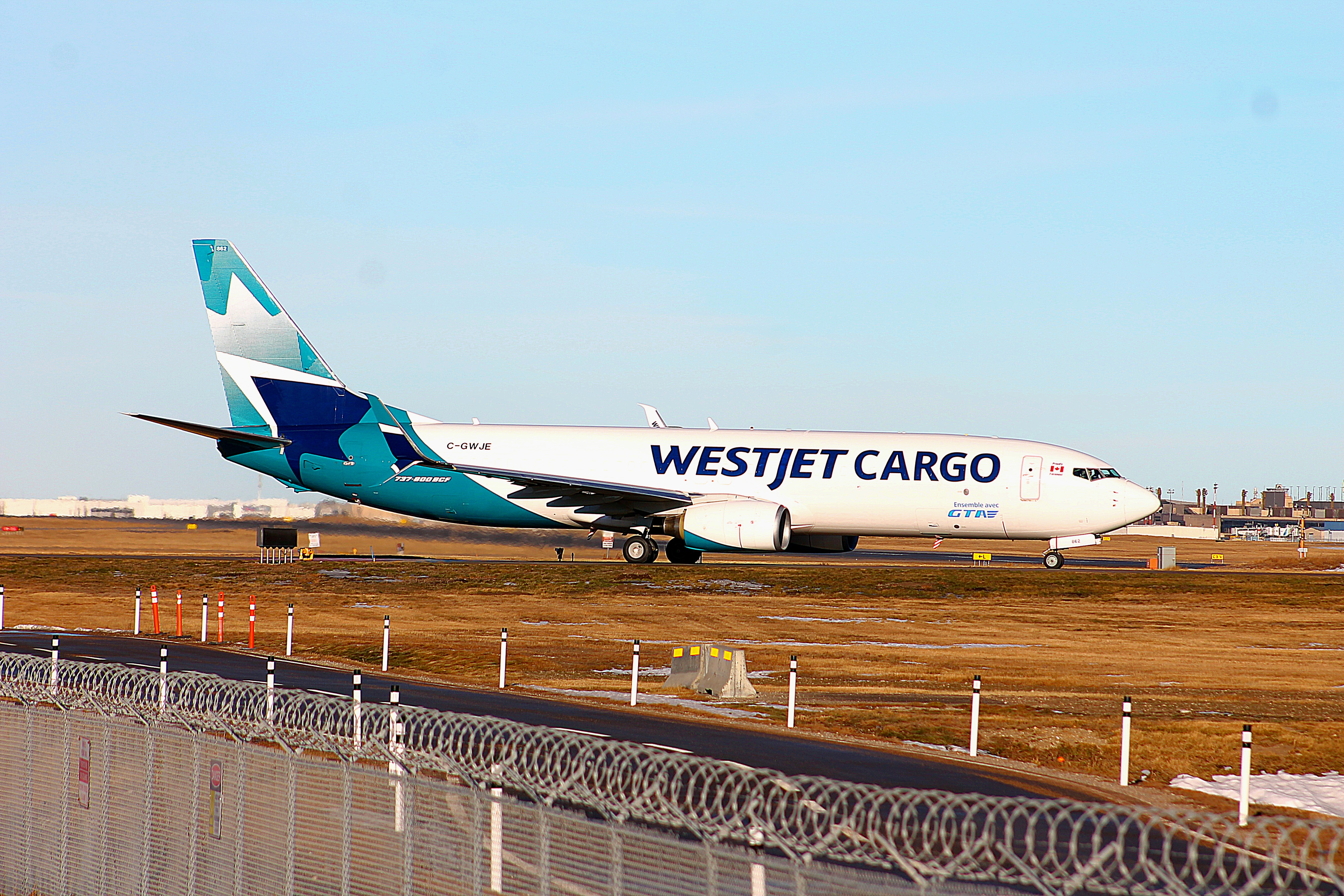
WestJet Cargo Boeing 737BCF taxies to the runway in Calgary for departure to Toronto.

In June, 2021, WestJet announced that they would begin dedicated freighter operations using converted Boeing 737-800BCF Freighters in an attempt to benefit from the heavy cargo operations that occurred globally during the pandemic, but also to disrupt the air cargo industry in Canada. Although the first freighter was delivered in April, 2022 they would not be certified by transport Canada for over a year after delivery in April 2023, with operations beginning later that same month. Initially, there were three BCF's in the fleet, with a fourth joining later on that year.

=== 2022–present: Focus on Western Canada and strategic low-cost plan ===
On June 16, 2022, WestJet announced that it will be reaffirming the airline's commitment to "embracing its cost-conscious roots in service of affordable air travel for Canadians". With this in mind, the current CEO has announced that the airline will be returning to its low-cost roots, shifting its focus to western Canada, and investing in leisure routes. This change resulted in numerous routes and destinations in eastern Canada to be dropped.

On September 29, 2022, WestJet announced it had placed an order for an additional 42 Boeing 737 MAX 10 aircraft, making the airline's narrow-body order book the largest in Canada.

On October 6, 2022, WestJet's CEO, Alexis von Hoensbroech, and Alberta Premier, Jason Kenney, announced a major partnership between the Government of Alberta and the WestJet Group. The agreement outlined that Calgary International Airport would become WestJet's sole global hub and the company would designate the airport as "the only airport where WestJet connects directly to intercontinental destinations" Additionally, WestJet would base its entire Boeing 787 Dreamliner fleet in Calgary, opening up the potential for new routes to Europe and Asia. WestJet would also base over 100 aircraft in Calgary and double its capacity at the airport before the end of the decade.

On December 5, 2022, WestJet announced its first destination in Asia, with service from Calgary International Airport to Narita International Airport beginning with three times weekly service on April 30, 2023. WestJet also announced new routes from Calgary to Barcelona–El Prat Airport and Edinburgh Airport, both being served three times a week beginning in May 2023, as well as frequency increases on existing European routes as a part of their plan to increase capacity in Calgary by more than 25% in 2023.

In November 2023, WestJet announced the restart of transatlantic service in Eastern Canada utilizing its Boeing 737 MAX 8 fleet, with the return of service from Toronto to Dublin and Edinburgh, St. John's to London (Gatwick) and Halifax to Dublin, Edinburgh and London (Gatwick). The airline also announced the expansion of transatlantic service from Calgary with new non-stop flights to Keflavík Airport in Reykjavík, Iceland. WestJet also revealed plans to expand its Asian footprint with new seasonal service from Calgary International Airport to South Korea's Incheon International Airport.

In June 2024, WestJet's aircraft mechanic union launched a three-day strike, forcing over 1000 flights to be cancelled in the lead up to the Canada Day long weekend. In October 2024, WestJet will be transitioning all WestJet Link routes from Link to Encore, ending the airline's six-year capacity purchase agreement with Pacific Coastal Airlines. The change is announced as a growth strategy for WestJet's regional network, which will see the WestJet Link routes now being operated by WestJet Encore's 78-seat Bombardier Q400, as opposed to Pacific Coastal's 34-seat Saab 340B.

In March 2025, WestJet decided their dedicated freighter network was no longer viable and would not be part of the airlines long-term plans. As a result, the airline began the process of ending its dedicated freighter network and focusing their cargo operations on belly cargo. At the time, two of the airlines four Boeing 737-800BCF's were in storage, with the other two primarily operating flights for Cargojet on that airlines route between Newark Liberty International Airport to L.F. Wade International Airport in Bermuda. This decision was also led by Kirsten de Bruijn's (Executive VP of Westjet Cargo) decision to exit WestJet.

In May 2025, WestJet announced a partnership with Canadian Tire Corporation, under which it would allow customers to link their WestJet Rewards account with Canadian Tire's Triangle Rewards program beginning in 2026.

In June 2025, WestJet suffered a data breach attack from what they describe as a "sophisticated, criminal third party." The data exposed in the breach included names, contact details and travel documents, though no payment information was exfiltrated. WestJet made a notice to U.S. residents on September 29, 2025.

In September 2025, WestJet ordered 60 737 MAX 10 and 7 787-9 Dreamliner aircraft, the largest-ever Canadian order of Boeing airplanes.

In January 2026, WestJet announced winter seasonal service from Calgary to São Paulo on the 787, set to commence in November. This would form the first link from Western Canada to South America, as well as becoming both WestJet's 100th destination from YYC and their longest route.

WestJet officially suspended its operations to Cuba on February 9, 2026, alongside other Canadian airlines, due to a severe aviation fuel shortage at Cuban airports. Faced with the inability to refuel on-site, the company and its subsidiaries, including Sunwing Vacations, initiated a phased withdrawal by sending empty aircraft from Canada. These aircraft carried enough fuel for the round trip in order to repatriate Canadian travelers already on the island.

On March 3, 2026, the Canadian Transportation Agency imposed administrative penalties totaling $70,000 on WestJet for 35 violations of the Air Passenger Protection Regulations. These penalties are linked to the delay and cancellation of flight WS3103 between Calgary and Nanaimo on February 16, 2025. The federal agency faulted the airline for failing to provide passengers with reasonable quantities of food and drink, as well as failing to offer them the necessary hotel accommodation and transportation during their overnight wait.

On August 2, 2026, the airline's flight attendants represented by CUPE went on strike, resulting in all flights being cancelled. WestJet announced a tentative agreement with CUPE on the morning of August 3, 2026, and flights resumed that day. A vote by union members to ratify this deal remains pending.

== Acquisition of Sunwing ==
On March 2, 2022, the WestJet Group announced its intent to acquire the Canadian low-cost airline Sunwing. Both WestJet and Sunwing reported that they had reached a mutual, definitive agreement for the merger. Following the close of the transaction, the two airlines would create a new "tour business operating unit" which would be led by current Sunwing CEO Stephen Hunter, which would bind the two airlines' vacation units - Sunwing Vacations and WestJet Vacations - together. The "tour business operating unit" would be based out of Sunwing's head office in Toronto, while the operations of Sunwing would be transitioned and managed at WestJet's head office in Calgary. The acquisition announcement was made shortly after WestJet's new CEO Alexis Von Hoensbroech assumed the role. Shortly after, the Canadian Competition Bureau was asked to review this intent.

On October 26, 2022, the Canadian Competition Bureau sent a letter to Transport Canada under the Government of Canada, raising "significant concerns" and "uncertainty" on the acquisition. The letter raised concerns about the elimination of competition between the two airlines, which would result in "substantial lessening" or "prevention" of competition in the sale of airline vacation packages to Canadians, specifically for ones which are for sun destinations, such as Mexico or the Caribbean. The report stated that "the proposed transaction will result in one of Canada's largest integrated tour operations being acquired by one of its primary rivals in the provision of vacation packages." The report also stated that "overall, WestJet and Sunwing account for 37 percent of non-stop capacity between Canada and sun destinations, and 72 percent of non-stop capacity between Western Canada and sun destinations." The report also outlined warnings in which for the acquisition would take place, it would likely result in "higher ticket prices and lower services offered."

In the report, the Competition Bureau also raised concerns about the "monopoly" that the merger would create on 16 routes between Canada and Mexico or the Caribbean. However, in an emailed statement to the Canadian Broadcasting Corporation which was sent on October 26, 2022, from Sunwing spokesperson Melanie Anne Filipp said that the routes which were identified by the Competition Bureau were "predominately" in Western Canada and accounted for a "very small portion of Sunwing's operations" - just over 10 percent - and were "primarily seasonal routes". As well, Filipp says that 6 out of 16 routes that the Competition Bureau had identified as a concern were no longer being operated by Sunwing. "We remain confident that this transaction is good news for Canadians."

News outlets have also been quoting Air Canada and Air Transat's failed merger. The acquisition, which was set to merge Canada's largest airline with Canada's third largest and top leisure airline, fell through, even after the Canadian government gave Air Canada and Transat the green light to go through with the merger, which saw Air Canada buyout Air Transat for just over US$150 million. It fell through after European Union regulators refused to grant Air Canada and Transat A.T. the go-ahead for the buyout, which is where Air Transat and Air Canada gain lots of revenue - on trans-Atlantic flights from Canada to Europe. In April 2021, Air Canada and Air Transat mutually agreed to terminate the buyout.

On March 10, 2023, the Canadian federal government formally approved the WestJet-Sunwing merger. "Today's decision was not taken lightly, especially in light of everything that happened over the holidays for those who flew with Sunwing," Canadian Transport Minister Omar Alghabra said in a statement, as he referred to the chaos during the December 2022 North American winter snowstorm that disrupted millions who had travel plans over the winter holidays. Sunwing's handling over the situation was heavily criticized as it left thousands stranded in Cancún, Mexico. "After considering the pros and cons, we have made the decision that will allow Sunwing to continue to provide affordable vacation packages to Canadians, create more good jobs and protect current jobs as well as Canadians who have already purchased tickets." he continued. However, with the green light, are several conditions in which the merger must follow. It goes as follows:

- Extending Sunwing vacation packages to five new Canadian cities
- Maintaining a vacations business head office in Toronto and a regional head office in Montreal for at least five years
- Improve regional connectivity and baggage handling
- Boost net employment at Sunwing's aforementioned Toronto head office
- Gradually ending its seasonal plane-leasing practice to protect jobs in Canada (refers to Sunwing's seasonal practices of leasing its Boeing 737 aircraft to airlines in Europe, such as TUI, whom it has leased its aircraft to during the summer season for several years now.)

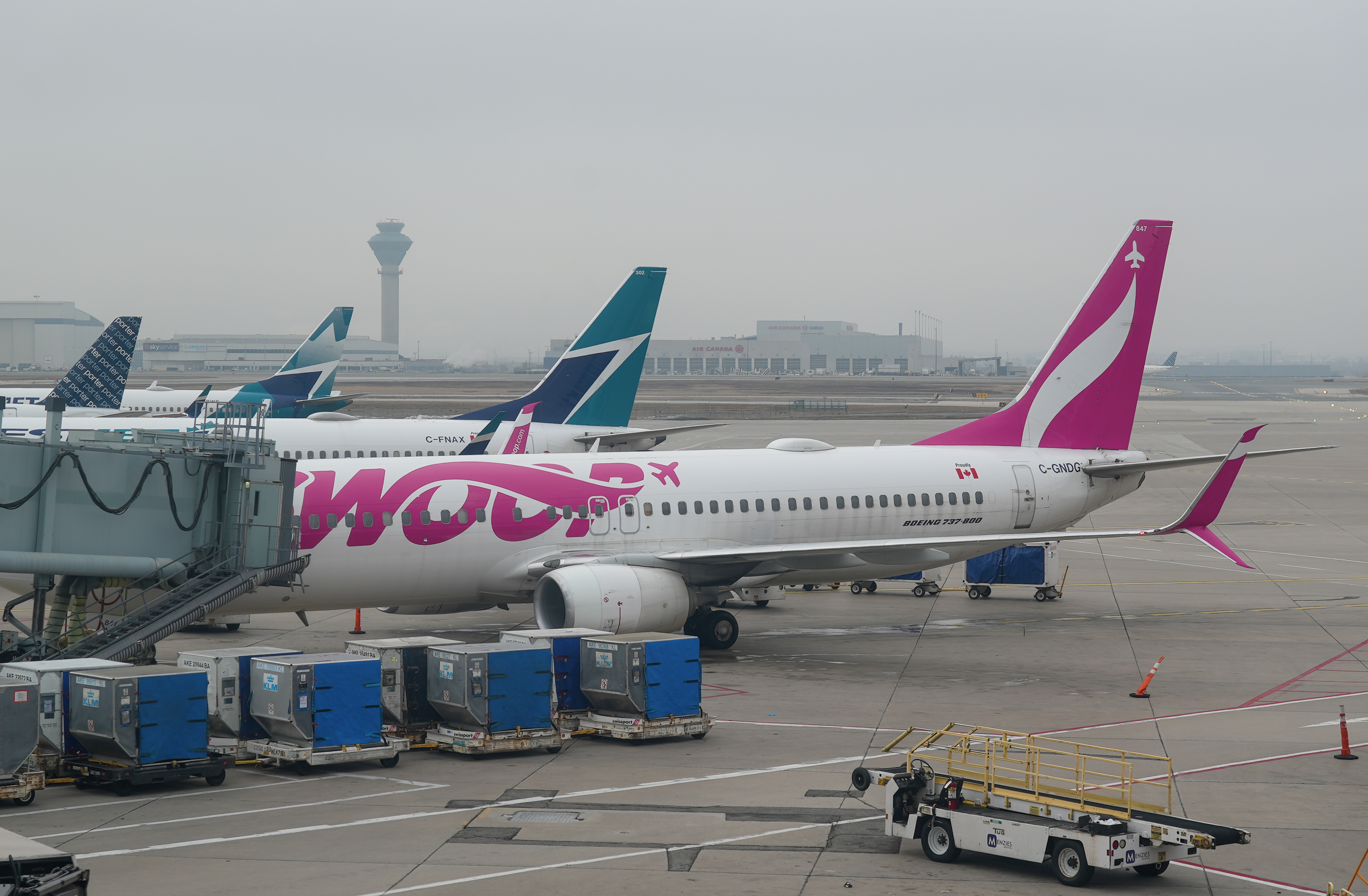
A Boeing 737-800 still bearing the Swoop livery in 2024

On May 1, 2023, the WestJet Group completed its acquisition of Sunwing Vacations and Sunwing. Stephen Hunter, formerly the CEO of Sunwing Vacations, has been appointed CEO of the WestJet Group's Vacations Business, responsible for all tour operating and vacation package businesses of both the Sunwing Vacations and WestJet Vacations brands. The WestJet Group's newly combined tour operator businesses, comprising WestJet Vacations and Sunwing Vacations, will be headquartered in Toronto, Ontario and will continue to operate a Montreal office.

On June 17, 2023, WestJet confirmed it will wind down Sunwing, integrating the low-cost carrier into its mainline business within two years as part of a plan to streamline operations on an unknown date.

On September 29, 2023, WestJet stated via an announcement that they aim to merge Sunwing's entirety into WestJet by October 2024. They plan to integrate all of Sunwing's 18 Boeing 737 aircraft into WestJet's mainline fleet and transition more than 2,000 current Sunwing employees into WestJet's existing structure by that date. This merger is on top of WestJet's decision to shut down Swoop, its former ultra-low-cost carrier which it brought into the market in 2017. As of October 2023, Swoop has been fully integrated into WestJet; however, the aircraft from Swoop retain the Swoop livery and cabin.

== Corporate affairs ==
=== Ownership and structure ===
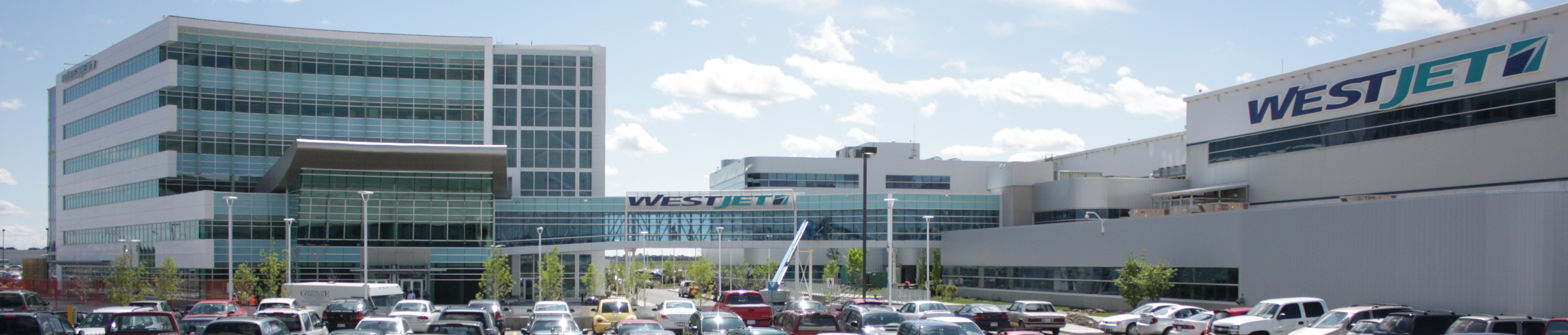
WestJet's headquarters is based at Calgary International Airport.

WestJet Airlines Ltd. is operated by WestJet Group, a private company, incorporated and domiciled in Canada, which since December 2019 has been owned by Toronto-based private equity firm Onex Corporation.

On May 13, 2019, WestJet announced that it had accepted an offer from Onex Corporation to purchase the company, a $5-billion deal that would require shareholder approval (in July) and regulatory approval. The offer was for $31 a share, substantially higher than the closing price of approximately $18 at the close of trading on the previous business day. Completion of the acquisition was announced on December 11, 2019, after the regulator had determined that WestJet will continue to meet Canadian ownership and control requirements if Onex amends its bylaws to ensure any matters voted on by the board of directors are done with a majority of Canadian directors present.

WestJet's shares were withdrawn from the market, having previously been publicly traded on the Toronto Stock Exchange (TSX) under the symbol WJA.

On May 9, 2025, Delta Air Lines acquired 15% of WestJet for US$300 million (and selling its 2.3% stake to Air France–KLM), with Korean Air acquiring a 10% stake for US$220 million. Onex Group retained the other 75%. The transaction was closed on October 22, 2025.

==== WestJet Encore ====
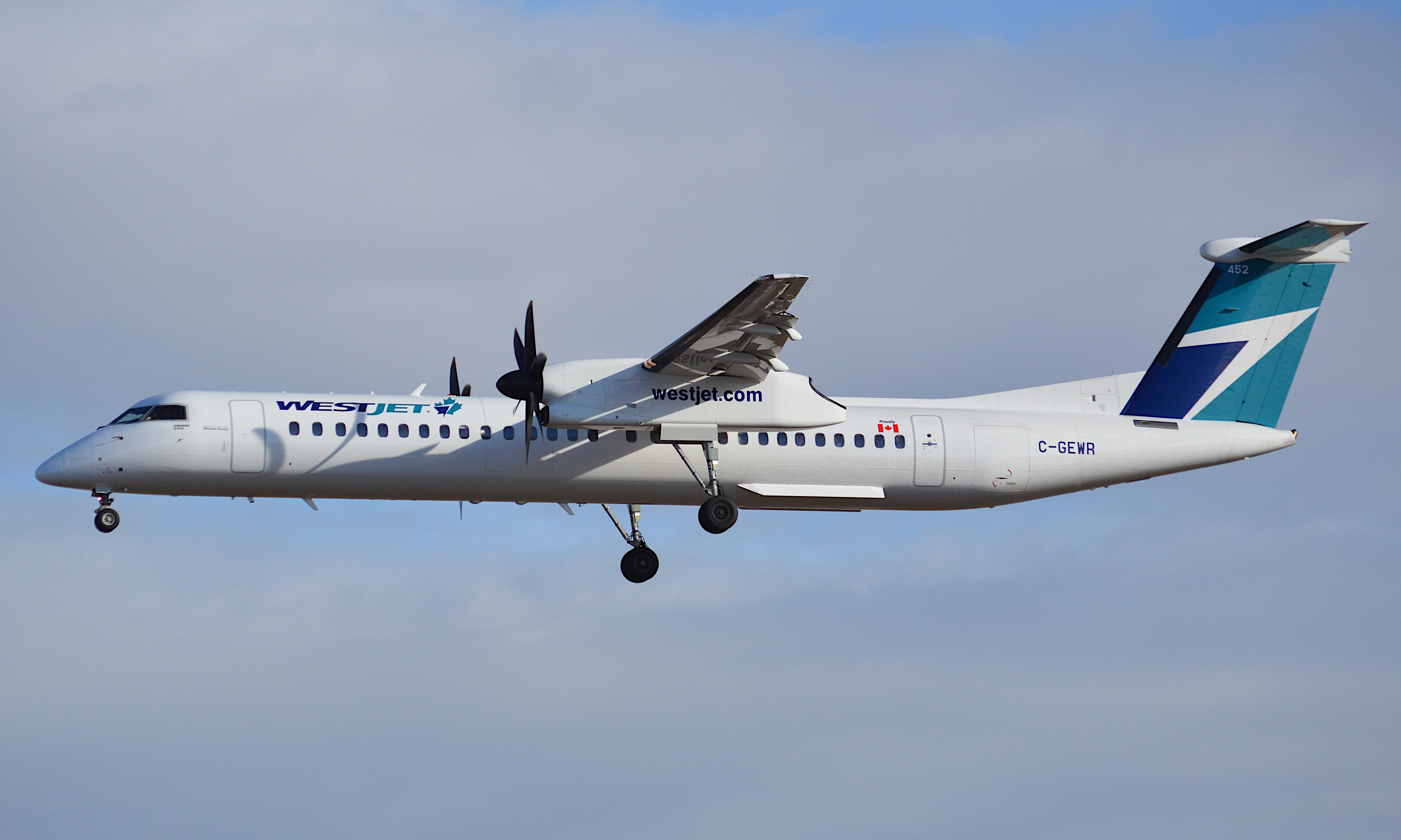
De Havilland Canada Dash 8 Q400 used by WestJet Encore, a regional airline subsidiary

WestJet Encore is WestJet's affiliated regional airline, which commenced operations on June 24, 2013, with a fleet of De Havilland Canada Dash 8 twin-turboprop aircraft. WestJet Encore was granted its separate Air Operator Certificate from Transport Canada, on June 12, 2013. It was set up to serve smaller communities in Canada.

==== WestJet Vacations ====
WestJet Vacations is a subsidiary of the Sunwing Vacations Group. The vacation arm was established to provide customers with comprehensive travel packages, combining flights and accommodations to various destinations. The service was officially launched in June 2006, allowing WestJet to extend its offerings beyond air travel and cater to the growing demand for all-inclusive vacation options.

WestJet Vacations offers a range of travel packages, including flights, accommodations, and sometimes car rentals or other amenities. These packages are designed to provide customers with convenience and cost savings when planning their vacations. The destinations covered by WestJet Vacations span across popular tourist spots in Mexico, the Caribbean, the United States, and other locations.

==== Sunwing Vacations Group ====
The recently established Sunwing Vacations Group, a part of the WestJet Group, comprises five prominent vacation and travel brands: Sunwing Vacations, WestJet Vacations, Vacation Express (a U.S. tour operator), and travel retailers SellOffVacations.com and Luxe Destination Weddings. This development follows the WestJet Group's acquisition of Sunwing, finalized in May 2023. Despite their integration, each brand under the Sunwing Vacations Group umbrella will maintain its unique identity, collectively representing the largest vacation brands in North America, as highlighted by Andrew Dawson, President of Tour Operations for Sunwing Vacations Group.

=== Former subsidiaries ===
==== WestJet Link ====
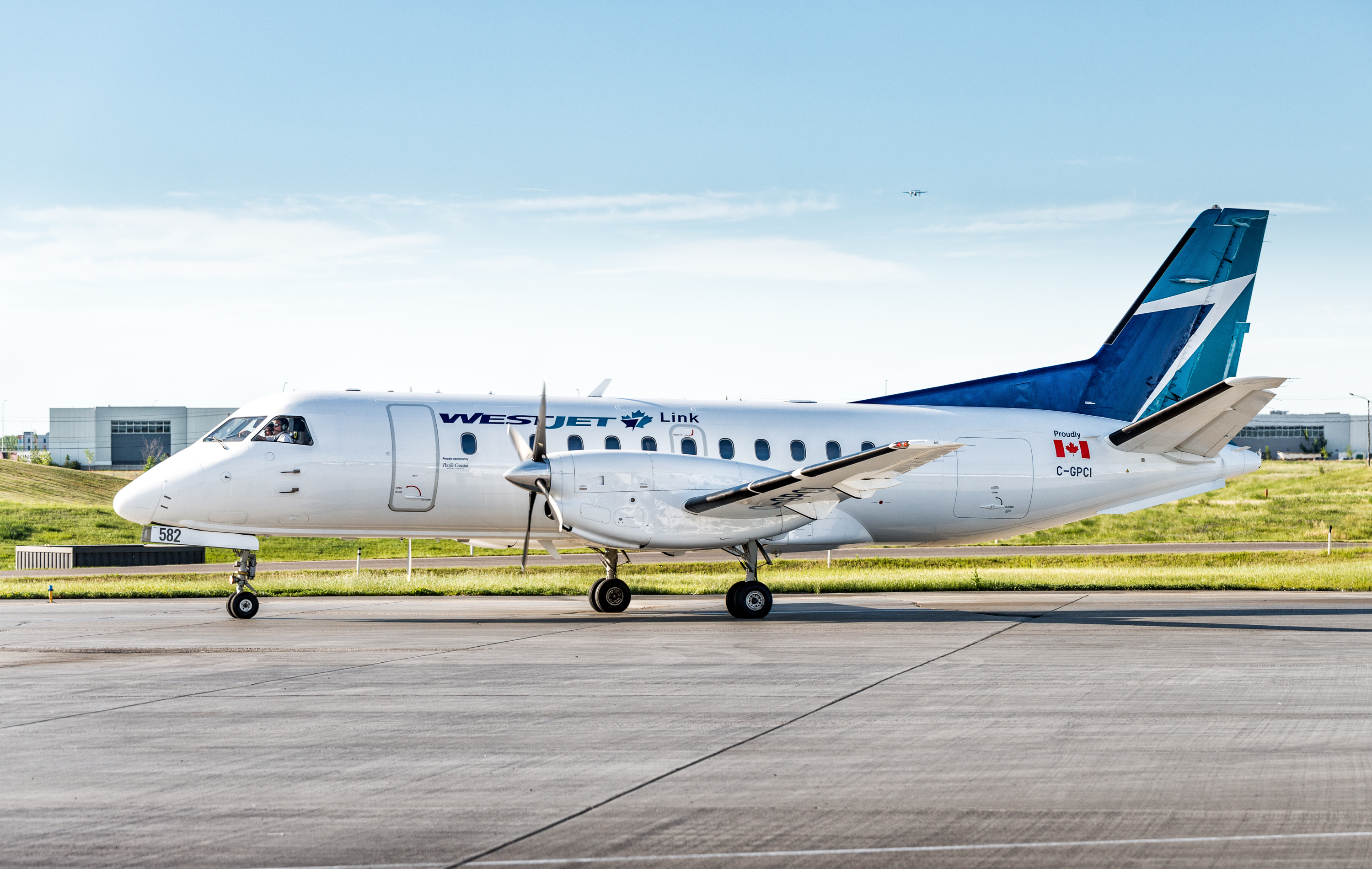
A Saab 340 formerly used by WestJet Link, a subsidiary that connected feeder flights to WestJet hubs

WestJet Link, launched in June 2018, was a capacity purchase agreement with Pacific Coastal Airlines operating flights on behalf of WestJet. The service "link[ed]" passengers from WestJet's hubs at Calgary and Vancouver to smaller communities in Western Canada using Saab 340B aircraft. The agreement ended in October 2024, with WestJet transitioning most routes from Link to Encore.

==== Swoop ====
Swoop was an ultra low-cost carrier (ULCC) owned by WestJet that commenced operations on June 20, 2018. Swoop operated a fleet of Boeing 737-800 aircraft, and later received Boeing 737 MAX 8 aircraft. All of these aircraft were transferred to WestJet's fleet at the end of its life. Swoop fully integrated with WestJet's mainline operations on October 28, 2023.

=== Business trends ===
The key trends for the WestJet Group (including subsidiaries) are:

(years ending December 31)	2012	2013	2014	2015	2016	2017	2018
Turnover (C$m)	3,427	3,662	3,977	4,029	4,123	4,507	4,733
Net profit after tax (C$m)	242	269	317	368	295	279	91
Number of employees (FTE at year end)	7,742	8,000	8,698	9,211	9,988	11,089	11,624
Number of passengers (m)	17.4	18.5	19.7	20.3	22.0	24.1	25.5
Passenger load factor (%)	82.8	81.7	81.4	80.0	81.8	83.6	83.8
Number of aircraft (at year end)	100	113	122	140	153	168	177
Notes/sources							

Annual accounts do not appear to have been published for 2019 onward, as WestJet became a private company that year and no longer publicizes this information.

== Destinations and hubs ==
=== Hubs ===
WestJet currently operates two hubs.

- Calgary: WestJet's Western Canada global hub. WestJet's fleet of Boeing 787-9 aircraft are based at this airport.
- Toronto–Pearson: WestJet's Eastern Canada hub connecting to destinations across Canada and sun destinations.

=== Destinations ===
As of 2025, WestJet flies to destinations across North America, Europe, Asia, and South America (first route from 2026). The airline operates a significant domestic network across the entire country, with operations mainly focused in Western Canada.

In 2015, WestJet would begin operating its first widebody aircraft - Boeing 767 family aircraft, acquired second-hand from Qantas. Four 767-300ERs began arriving in winter 2015 and were first used on routes primarily to and from Hawaii and the Caribbean (replacing chartered Boeing 757s that previously operated to Hawaii from Calgary and Edmonton), however in 2016 the airline started service to London Gatwick Airport from Calgary, Toronto, Vancouver, Edmonton and Winnipeg. Despite generally being a success, the 767s were unreliable as a result of their age, frequently resulting in delays, cancellations, and diversions to Iceland or Greenland. As a result, the transatlantic widebody offerings would eventually just be slimmed down to year-round service from Toronto and Calgary.

In 2017, in an effort to both expand transoceanic service and phase out the unreliable 767s, WestJet ordered 10 Boeing 787-9 aircraft, with 10 additional options. As part of the shift to a full-service carrier, these would be delivered in a three-class 320-seat configuration from 2019 onwards. In October 2018, the first 787 routes were revealed to be Calgary to Dublin and Paris, Toronto to Barcelona, and the replacement of the Boeing 767 on the Calgary to London Gatwick route, all to take effect in 2019. The COVID-19 pandemic put many further plans on hold, with the 787 order slimmed down to 7 and further options not pursued. In the wake of the pandemic, international widebody expansion resumed out of Calgary, with Amsterdam joining the route map in 2021 and Edinburgh, Dublin, and London Heathrow being announced in 2022. Heathrow and Gatwick would operate alongside each other until the end of the 2024 season, and the airline would also resume service to Barcelona from Calgary, with the service from Toronto suspended after the 2021 season. The first transpacific destination for WestJet was launched in 2023, with service to Tokyo Narita Airport, and WestJet would also add Seoul Incheon Airport to its route map in 2024. In 2025, WestJet placed an order to double its 787 fleet with Boeing, with 7 additional aircraft and 4 options. In January 2026, the airline announced it will begin seasonal winter service to São Paulo that November.

In addition to widebody operations, WestJet also operates a significant network of long-haul narrowbody routes, and has since it launched a route from Halifax to Glasgow on the 737-700 in 2015. WestJet has operated several narrowbody transatlantic routes since then, but all routes were suspended for the 2023 season due to shifting business strategies. Select routes returned and new ones launched for 2024. Utilizing strategic hubs in Toronto, Halifax and St. John's, the airline sends Boeing 737 MAX aircraft to Amsterdam, Paris, Dublin, Barcelona, London Gatwick (replacing 787 service) and Edinburgh. In late 2025, a wave of new destinations were announced from Toronto and Halifax for the 2026 season, including Copenhagen, Lisbon, Madrid, Cardiff, Glasgow, and Ponta Delgada. In addition, the airline also serves Reykjavík, Iceland from Calgary, Edmonton and Winnipeg, and Medellín, Colombia from Toronto.

As of 2025, WestJet serves 30 destinations in the United States. They mostly fall into two categories: leisure-focused destinations for warm weather travel, theme parks and cruises (including Santa Ana, Fort Lauderdale, Orlando, Palm Springs, Las Vegas, Phoenix, Anchorage, and Honolulu) and major international airports designed for connecting traffic, often with partner airline Delta Air Lines (including New York JFK, Atlanta, Chicago ORD, Los Angeles, Seattle, Minneapolis, Detroit, and Washington, DC). Many US cities see service from cities across Western Canada, however some are only served from WestJet's headquarter city of Calgary.

WestJet also has a significant presence in the Caribbean and Latin America, with major multi-route operations to cities like Cancún, Puerto Vallarta, Puerto Plata, Montego Bay, San José del Cabo, and Varadero. Following the acquisition of Sunwing Airlines, many routes and destinations were transferred to the WestJet network. This network is highly seasonal, with many routes only operating from October to May. In recent years, non-leisure focused destinations south of the United States have also been added to the WestJet network, starting with Mexico City which was terminated in 2018 but re-launched for the 2025 season. Additional routes have included Guadalajara, Panama City and Medellín.

== Alliances and codeshare agreements ==
=== History ===
In 1999, WestJet was in talks regarding a possible 'feeder' arrangement for Air Canada's network. These talks were discontinued when Air Canada went forward with the acquisition of Canadian Airlines the following year.

In 2005, WestJet began a limited interline agreement with Taiwan-based China Airlines, in part to test the company's capability to partner with other carriers.

In 2006, WestJet announced it had been in talks with 70 airlines around the world interested in an interline or codeshare agreement. In August 2006, in a Globe and Mail interview, then-WestJet CEO Sean Durfy stated that WestJet was in talks with Oneworld. Durfy said that, if a deal with Oneworld were reached, it would allow WestJet to maintain its scheduling flexibility; Durfy was later quoted in 2007 saying that a deal for WestJet to join the Oneworld alliance was unlikely. Despite this, WestJet did formalize a deal with Oneworld in November 2008, to partner on sales of travel to corporate and business travellers.

In July 2008, WestJet announced it had signed a memorandum of understanding to build a distribution and codeshare agreement with U.S.-based Southwest Airlines. However, in April 2010, WestJet announced that the airline partnership with Southwest Airlines was terminated, and in October 2010, WestJet partnered with American Airlines instead and later added Delta Air Lines. In light of a possible joint venture between WestJet and Delta, American and WestJet ceased their codeshare agreement on July 31, 2018.

In May 2025, it was announced that Delta Air Lines, Korean Air, and Air France-KLM had purchased a collective 25% stake in WestJet, finalizing in October. This has fueled speculation in the industry that the airline may join the SkyTeam airline alliance.

=== Codeshare agreements ===
WestJet has codeshare agreements with the following airlines:

- Aeroméxico
- Air France
- Air Transat
- Condor
- Delta Air Lines
- Fiji Airways
- Icelandair
- Japan Airlines
- KLM
- Korean Air
- Qantas
- Qatar Airways
- Scandinavian Airlines
- Virgin Atlantic

=== Interline agreements ===
As of January 2025, WestJet additionally maintains interlining agreements with the following airlines:

- Aer Lingus
- Air China
- Air India
- Air New Zealand
- Air North
- Air Tahiti Nui
- Air Transat
- Alaska Airlines
- American Airlines
- British Airways
- Canadian North
- Central Mountain Air
- El Al
- Etihad Airways
- EVA Air
- Fiji Airways
- Finnair
- Icelandair
- LOT Polish Airlines
- Pacific Coastal Airlines
- Pakistan International Airlines
- PAL Airlines
- Qatar Airways
- Royal Air Maroc
- Scandinavian Airlines
- TAP Air Portugal
- Tunisair
- United Airlines
- Virgin Australia

== Fleet ==
=== Current fleet ===
As of September 10, 2026, WestJet operates an all-Boeing mainline fleet composed of the following aircraft:

WestJet fleet
Aircraft	In service	Orders	Passengers					Notes	Refs
Aircraft	In service	Orders	J	W	Y+	Y	Total	Notes	Refs
Boeing 737-700	34	—	—	12	12	108	132	To be retired and replaced with 737 Max 10s.	
Boeing 737-800	52	—	—	12	24	138	174		
Boeing 737 MAX 8	69	9	—	12	24	138	174		
Boeing 737 MAX 10	—	101	—	—	—	—	199	Launch customer. Order with 47 options. Deliveries until 2034. Cabin configuration details yet to be released.	
Boeing 787-9	7	9	16	28	60	216	320	Order with 4 options. Deliveries until 2034.	
Total	169	119							

=== Fleet strategy ===
Fleet strategy
Boeing 737-700

Boeing 737-800

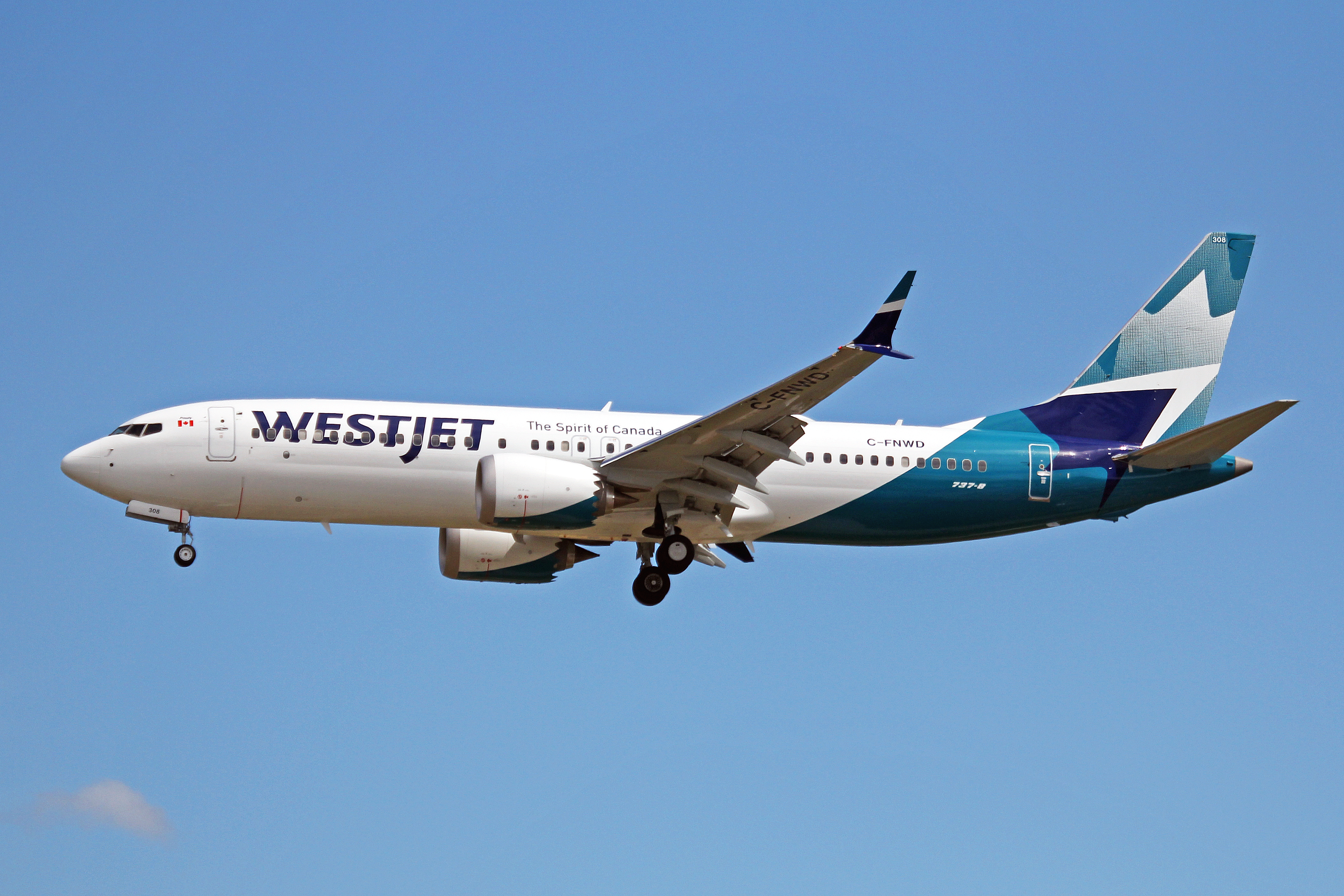
Boeing 737 MAX 8

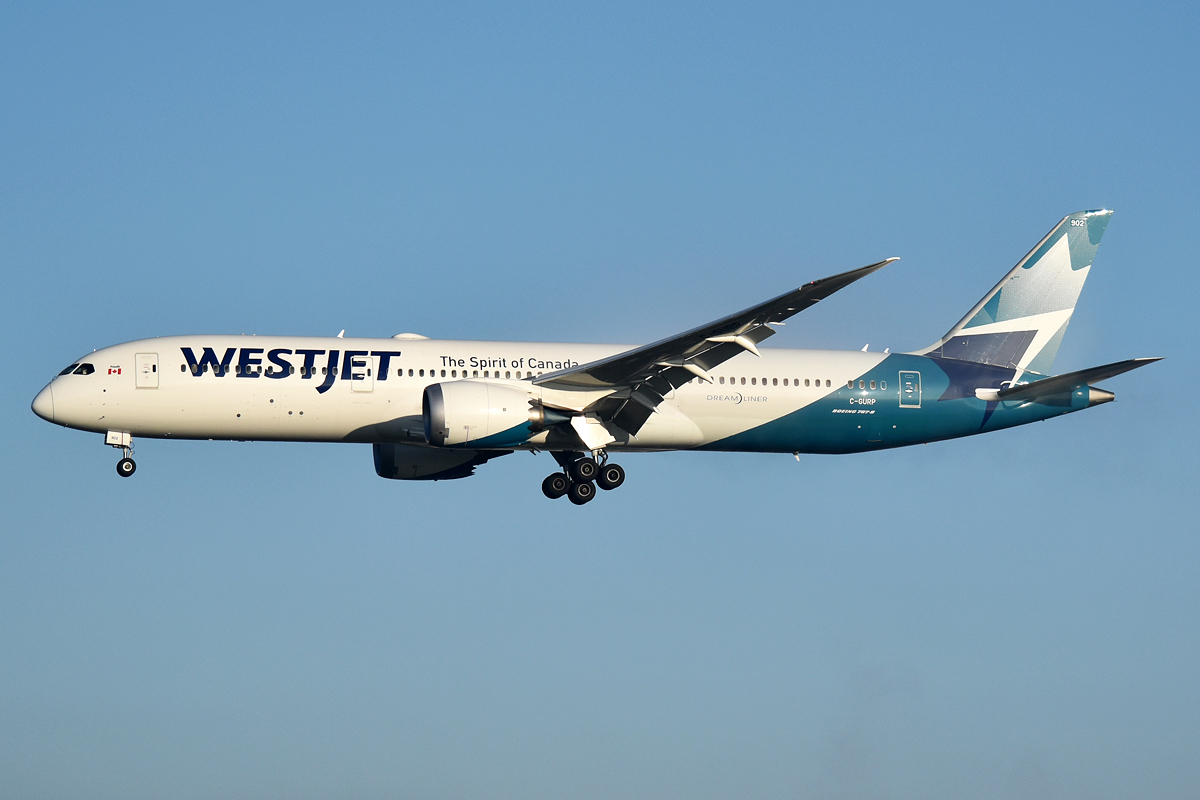
Boeing 787-9

The mainline fleet currently consists entirely of Boeing aircraft, while wholly owned subsidiary Encore flies Bombardier Q400s. Twenty aircraft were initially ordered with options for up to twenty-five more. The first two units were delivered in mid June 2013. Scheduled passenger service on these aircraft began on June 24, 2013. The first Boeing 737 Next Generation, a 737-700 delivery took place in 2001, and the first deliveries of 737-600 and 737-800 aircraft began in 2005, with the final 737-600 aircraft delivered in September 2006.

Boeing confirmed on August 2, 2007 that WestJet had placed an order for 23 Boeing 737 Next Generation aircraft. The order was primarily for 737-700 but with conversion rights to the larger Boeing 737-800s.

In the winter season before acquiring their Boeing 767s and Boeing 787 Dreamliners, WestJet temporarily wet leased some Boeing 757-200s to expand service between Alberta and Hawaii. From February through April 2011, a single aircraft was leased for this purpose; in the winter of 2011–12, a single aircraft was again leased. For the winter seasons from 2012 to 2015, this was expanded to two aircraft. In April 2013, it was announced that WestJet would sell ten of its oldest 737-700s and purchase ten 737-800s to modernize and increase capacity of its fleet.

In May 2014, CEO Gregg Saretsky announced that WestJet was considering acquiring wide-body aircraft to operate long-haul international routes. By July of the same year, Saretsky confirmed that wide-body service would begin in 2015. In June 2014, WestJet announced that the wide-body aircraft were to be second-hand Boeing 767-300ERs sourced from Qantas. The four Boeing 767s were an average of 25 years old, which meant that they needed frequent repairs and downtime for sourcing parts. This resulted in a poor on-time performance of 38 percent in 2016, costing the airline approximately $5 million in the second quarter of 2016. In 2017, WestJet reduced the number of flights from Winnipeg and Edmonton to reduce utilization of the planes for the summer of 2017 to cope with any unforeseen delays or cancellations.

In late December 2016, 77% of WestJet pilots approved a new deal that will increase pay for pilots flying wide-body aircraft such as the Boeing 767, Boeing 787 or Airbus A330. In a statement, the airline said that it was seeking more large aircraft intending to add new destinations. Saretsky also stated that he hoped for wide-body growth to be responsible, but quick. As of May 2, 2017, WestJet announced the purchase of up to 20 Boeing 787-9 Dreamliner aircraft; 10 were firm orders with deliveries from 2019 through 2021, and 10 were options for delivery between 2020 and 2024. WestJet ended up only taking delivery of seven Boeing 787-9 aircraft and cancelling the remaining three aircraft (two of which fully built and furnished) from the original order, citing a shifting fleet and network strategy. In 2022, WestJet and the Government of Alberta signed a partnership deal that would, among other things, hub all 787 intercontinental flying out of Calgary and, in the following years, launched new direct long-haul routes from Calgary (including to Tokyo Narita and Seoul Incheon), quickly running into fleet constraints and operational issues with high aircraft utilization, a lack of spare aircraft, and the inability to launch any additional long haul routes. Thus, in September 2025, it was confirmed that the airline would place a further order for 7 787-9s with options for four more, in addition to 65 more MAX 10s (plus 20 options) which the airline was now the launch customer for.

=== Historical fleet ===
WestJet historical fleet
Aircraft Type	Number operated	Introduction	Retirement	Notes
Boeing 737-200	25	1996	2006	
Boeing 737-600	13	2005	2021	
Boeing 767-300ER	4	2015	2020	

In 2003 and 2004, WestJet donated two of its 737-200s to post-secondary schools in western Canada, one to the British Columbia Institute of Technology and a second to the Southern Alberta Institute of Technology's Art Smith Aero Centre. In early 2005, it was announced that the Boeing 737 fleet would be retired and replaced by newer, more fuel-efficient 737 Next Generation series aircraft. On July 12, 2005, WestJet announced that it had completed the sale of its remaining 737-200 to Miami-based Apollo Aviation Group.

Boeing's 767s were first introduced to test the demand of flights to Europe, mainly to see if they could be successful with the routes. These 767s were acquired from Qantas, which had recently entirely retired their fleet of 767s. In July 2020, WestJet retired their fleet of four Boeing 767-300ER aircraft due to the COVID-19 pandemic. In January 2021, it was announced that the four 767-300 aircraft from WestJet were to be among a total of 11 to be purchased by Amazon and converted to freight use. As the testing was over, WestJet was comfortable with the European-Canadian market and would later utilize Boeing 787-9s.

=== Livery ===
Special liveries used by WestJet
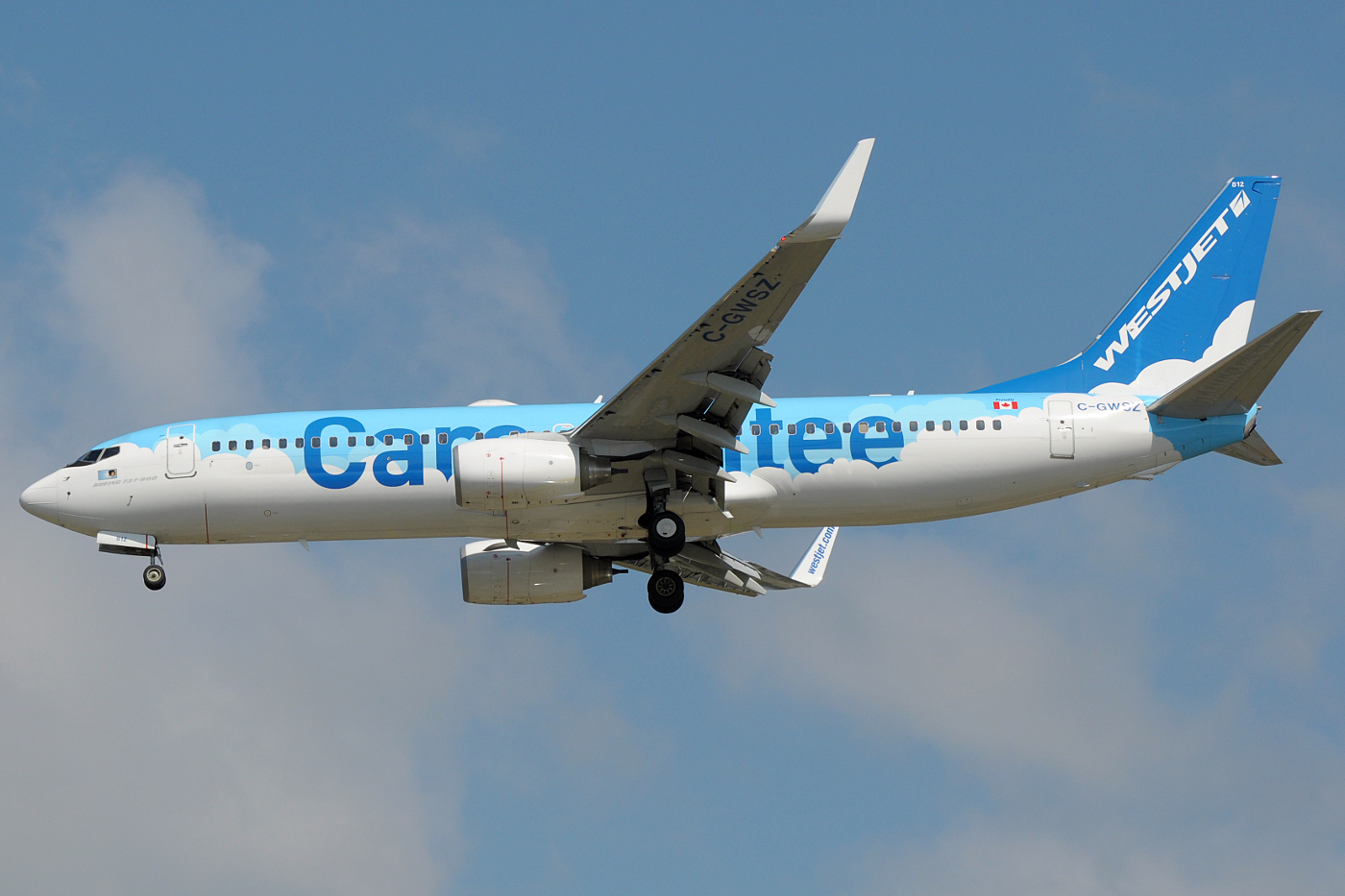
"Care-antee" This aircraft was repainted to the Magic Plane in December 2013.

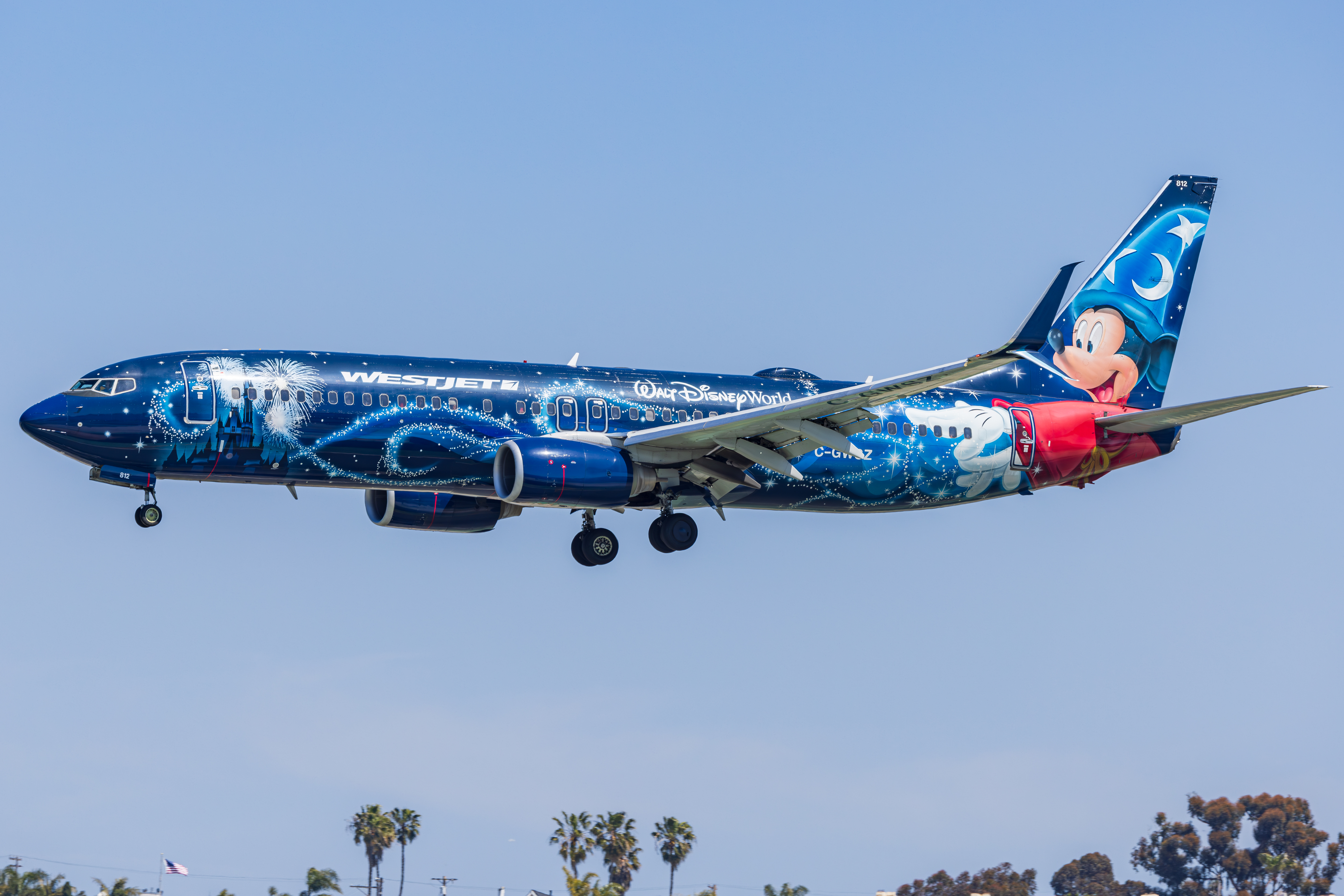
"Magic Plane", a Fantasia-themed livery promoting Walt Disney World. Repainted to the new WestJet livery in 2024.

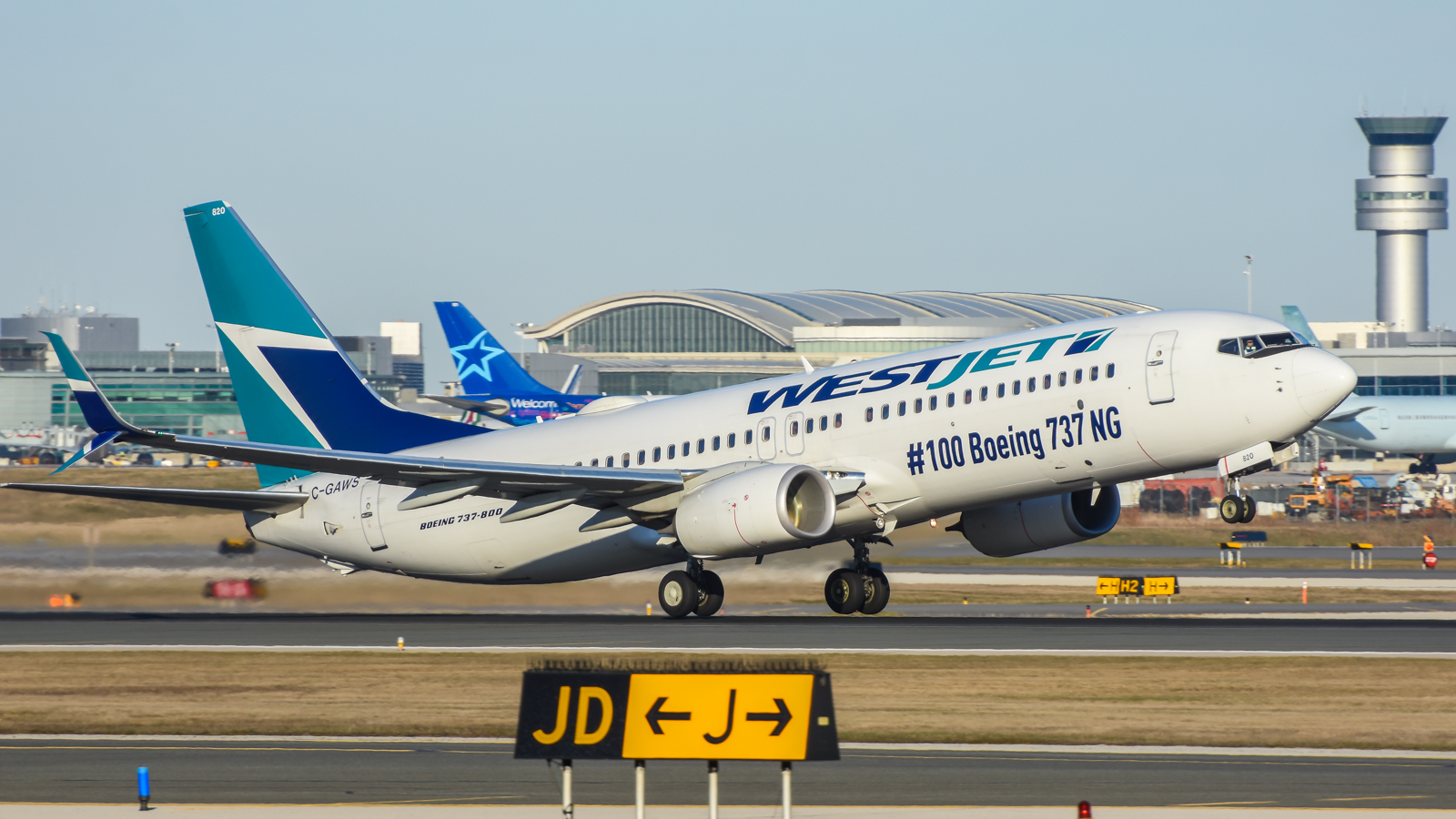
#100Boeing737NG subtitle adorns the lower fuselage of the 100th Boeing 737 NG aircraft received by the airline. This aircraft was re-painted in April 2024 to its new livery.

WestJet's aircraft are painted white except for the lettering on the fuselage, wings and vertical stabilizer. The tail is divided roughly into slanted thirds, coloured (from front to back) navy blue, white and teal. This pattern is used on the outside of the blended winglets at the end of the wings while, on the inside, the winglets are painted white with "WestJet.com" in dark blue lettering.

In February 2010, WestJet introduced a special livery on one Boeing 737-800 aircraft promoting its customer-service promise, or "Care-antee", in both English and French. This aircraft also featured a new tail design. In 2013, the Care-antee aircraft underwent a second livery change in partnership with Disney, featuring Mickey Mouse from the movie Fantasia and adopting the name "Magic Plane". A second Disney aircraft was completed in 2015, named "Frozen Plane", with characters Elsa and Anna on the vertical stabilizer and a similar theme in the cabin. Following the new CEO's decision, the Disney aircraft were repainted into the normal livery in 2024.

In May 2018, WestJet unveiled a new livery, the first significant change since the inception of the company. It includes a new font for the word "WestJet"; written across the middle of the aircraft fuselage is "The Spirit of Canada" on the port side and "L'esprit du Canada" on the starboard side. An updated, stylized maple leaf on the aircraft tail is also included.

In April 2022, WestJet Cargo's first dedicated freighter, a Boeing 737-800BCF, was delivered. It featured the airlines standard livery that was introduced in 2018, except it had largo "CARGO" titles following the WestJet titles on the side of the aircraft, as well as "In partnership with GTA" titles at the front of the aircraft. These titles are English on one side, and French on the other and signify the partnership WestJet began with GTA Aviation to help sell capacity on the freighters.

On October 28, 2023, WestJet's subsidiary Swoop was integrated into WestJet's mainly operations. All of the aircraft (Boeing 737-800s and 737MAX8s) were added to the fleet, with no repainting. Swoop branding was still visible on the aircraft after the Swoop's ending, with smaller WestJet logo stickers put on the aircraft. All of the 16 aircraft are scheduled to be repainted by the end of 2025, along with configuration editing to fit the WestJet normal.

In 2024, all special livery planes were repainted to the new WestJet livery, leaving no special liveries to be spotted. However, Swoop and Sunwing (May 2025 onward) liveries can be seen on WestJet aircraft due to no repainting. They are expected to be repainted by the end of 2025.

On May 28, 2025, Sunwing flew its final flight since WestJet bought ownership of the airline. A total of 18 aircraft were transferred from Sunwing to WestJet, without being repainted, and still with their all-economy configurations. The configurations are expected to be modified into the WestJet normal.

== Accidents and incidents ==
- January 5, 2018 – WestJet Flight 2425, a Boeing 737-800 (registration C-FDMB) flight from Cancún to Toronto, was struck while parked and on approach to the gate by a Sunwing Boeing 737-800 (registration C-FPRP) being towed at Toronto Pearson International Airport. A fire on the Sunwing aircraft's tail was put out by fire crews at the airport. A total of 168 passengers and 6 crew were on board the WestJet aircraft and were evacuated but none were injured; the Sunwing aircraft had no passengers as it was being re-positioned.
- September 7, 2025 – WestJet Flight 2276, a Boeing 737-800 (registration C-GWSR) flying from Toronto Pearson International Airport to Princess Juliana International Airport on the island of Sint Maarten had a right main gear collapse while landing on runway 10. No one was injured, however three people were taken to hospital for precautionary evaluation.

== Controversies ==
In September 2025, WestJet announced a cabin reconfiguration for 43 of its Boeing 737 aircraft to install an extra row of seats and divide the economy cabin into multiple tiers. This densification plan introduced a "fixed recline design" featuring several rows of non-reclining seats, alongside a seat pitch reduction to 28 inches, meaning passengers would be required to pay an additional fee for a reclining seat or standard legroom. Following initial pushback from passengers, WestJet halted the rollout of the non-reclining seats in December 2025, pausing the project after having already modified 21 aircraft. In January 2026, the airline faced national scrutiny once again when a video of two passengers struggling to fit into the restricted legroom went viral. This second wave of backlash included public statements from flight attendant unions, who raised concerns regarding potential safety and accessibility issues during emergency evacuations. On January 16, 2026, WestJet announced a complete reversal of the densification plan, committing to the removal of the extra row of seats from the modified aircraft in order to restore a standard 30-inch seat pitch.
