= Bedo Phylip Bach =

15th-century Welsh poet

Bedo Phylip Bach (fl. 1480) was a Welsh poet. He is thought to be from the same district as, and associated with Bedo Brwynllys. His works include eleven strict metre poems.
