= Clive Beddoe =

Canadian businessman

Clive Beddoe (born 26 May 1946) is a founding shareholder and former chairman of the board of directors of WestJet, which is currently the second-largest airline in Canada behind Air Canada.

Beddoe was born in Dorking and grew up in the neighboring town of Leatherhead in Surrey, England.

Beddoe first started flying gliders at Epsom College in England during his teenage years. He moved to Calgary in late 1970, working for Marathon Realty and the Cascade Group. Seven years later, he founded his own commercial development company called Hanover Management, named after Hanover Square, London a location where he had once worked. The company purchased Western Concord Manufacturing, a plastics manufacturer company based out of Delta, British Columbia, in 1994.

In 2000, WestJet's founders, Beddoe, Mark Hill, Tim Morgan and Donald Bell were honored as 'The Ernst & Young Entrepreneur of the Year' for Canada and Beddoe was honored at the international Entrepreneur of the year awards in Monaco.

He has been awarded honorary degrees from the University of Calgary and the Wilfrid Laurier University.

On Tuesday, 24 July 2007, Beddoe announced that effective 4 September 2007, he would relinquish his duties as chief executive officer, with then-president Sean Durfy taking the role.

He is currently on the board for AIMCO, and head of their compensation committee.

== Awards and honours ==
Beddoe was inducted to the Order of the Canadian Business Hall of Fame in 2012. Beddoe was also inducted into Canada's Aviation Hall of Fame in 2014.

WestJet's first Boeing 787-9 Dreamliner, registered C-GUDH, has been named after him.
