= Gregg Saretsky =

Canadian airline executive

Gregg Saretsky (born 1959 in Châteauguay, Quebec) is a former president and CEO of WestJet, a carrier based in Calgary, Alberta. He served in that position from April 2010 to March 8, 2018, after the resignation of Sean Durfy.

== Early life and education ==
He grew up in a Montreal suburb to a French mother and a German father. He moved with his family to Richmond, British Columbia in 1970. He acquired a Bachelor of Science in microbiology and biochemistry in 1982 and a master of business administration in 1984, both at University of British Columbia.

== Career ==
From 1985 to 1998, he worked for Canadian Airlines, rising to vice president roles for Airports and Marketing. From 1998-2008 he was an executive at Seattle based Alaska Airlines. In mid 2009 he joined WestJet as vacation vice-president; in April 2010 he became CEO of the airline.

== Awards and recognitions ==
- Business Person of the Year for 2012 by Alberta Venture magazine.

Top New Canadian CEO 2013, Canadian Business Magazine

== Personal life ==
Saretsky is married and has three children. He has also two older brothers who are commercial pilots, one with Cathay Pacific and the other with Air Canada.
