= Ieuan Deulwyn =

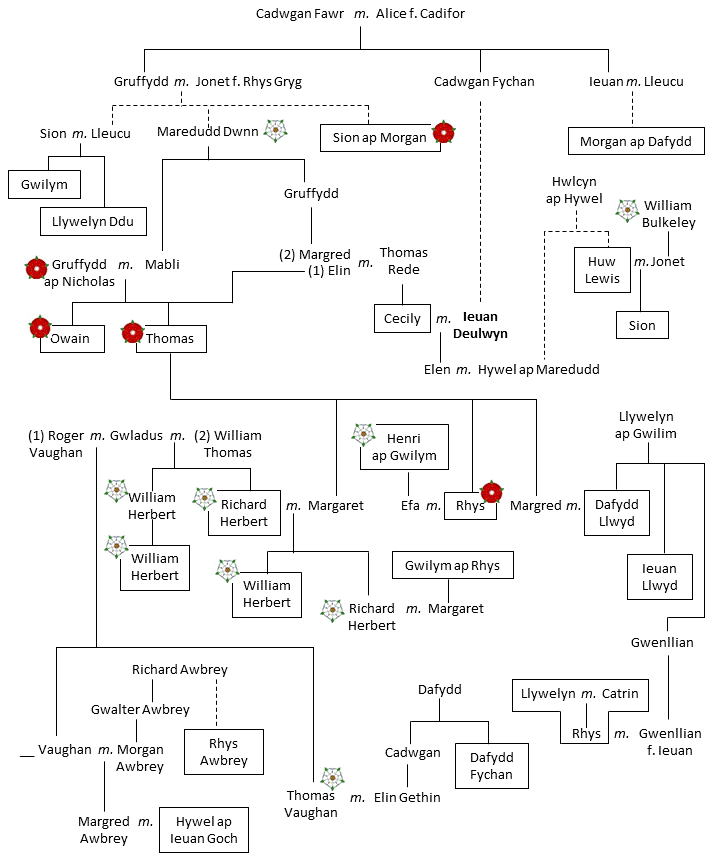
Family and Political Connections of the Subjects of Ieuan Deulwyn's Poetry

Ieuan Deulwyn (fl. c. 1460) was a Welsh language poet or bard.

== Poetry ==
A collection of fifty of the poems of Ieuan Deulwyn were published in 1909 under the auspices of the Bangor Welsh Manuscripts Society, thanks to Ifor Williams.

Ieuan Deulwyn belonged to the school of Dafydd ap Gwilym, as did Bedo Brwynllys, Dafydd ab Edmwnd and others. Because they have similar styles, their work is constantly attributed to each other, which makes definitive identification of Ieuan's poetry difficult. Williams used the evidence of multiple manuscripts as a determination of which poems to include in his collection, which may have resulted in some of Deulwyn's poems being excluded, but we are fortunate indeed in the edition that was published, complete with explanatory footnotes, notes about many of the subjects, and indexes of both people and places.

Ieuan clings to one metre, the cywydd. There are several types of cywydd, each with strictly defined rules that were well established by Ieuan's time. In the less rigid forms of poetry to which we are accustomed in English, strict rules might seem to result in a staid or dry poetry. But, as Glanmor Williams says, “Far from being fetters which intolerably shackle the poet’s ability to express himself freely, [the rules of cynghanedd and cywydd] become adornments which add to the power as well as the elegance of the verse”. No wonder it took at least nine years to become a master poet! Of course these rules developed around the Welsh language, complicating translation of the poetry into English. One poem that has been translated into English is an elegy for Dafydd Fychan ap Dafydd of Llyn-went, Llanbister, Radnorshire, and his friend Ieuan ap Gruffudd ap Hywel Llwyd of Cloch-faen, Llangurig, Montgomeryshire. The friends were slain in an ambush during the reign of Henry VI.

Ieuan's best work is considered to be in his love poems, which comprise the majority of his collected works (22 of 50 poems). Williams says that he is “above all a poet of love.” And George Borrow opines that “Ieuan Deulwyn’s most beautiful production is his cywydd to a birch tree.” Borrow suggests this might have some relation to the “deulwyn” part of his name, but the word for birch, bedwen, can also mean a symbol of constancy in love. For Ieuan, this quality apparently superseded marriage, as one of his poems, “To a Cuckold,” implies. This poem is also described as a “poem to his love who had alienated him after marrying a wealthy churl.” The expectation that a married woman would remain faithful to her former lover might reveal something about the society in which he lived or perhaps the character of the poet. After all, his teacher was Dafydd ap Gwilym.

Deulwyn's poems have the usual romantic references, but his melancholy laments are even better:

What of love? What does it matter?
Taste is the craving of men.
Sweet is thy kiss
If the bruise of a strawberry is sweet.

Deulwyn sometimes borders on what might be considered blasphemy in other ages. In praise of the generosity of Sion ap Dafydd of Llysnewydd, he says in his elegy: “If he is in his [Sion’s] home, God will not be without a drink of wine.” “Do not be so treacherous” writes a later copyist in the margin, but Deulwyn says, “His treatment of his guests made a saint of Sion’s soul.”

In his elegy to Sir Richard Herbert, Ieuan compares the sorrow at the news of his death to the crucifixion of Christ, and the betrayal at Banbury as exceeded only by the betrayal of God. Similarly, in his elegy to Dafydd Fychan and Ieuan ap Gruffydd: “As Mary mourned, beneath the cross, her son’s fell wounds, so I their loss.”

His poems of praise are loaded with genealogy, “until they bore the poet,” but they are a treat for the historian and genealogist. The subjects of these poems are generally the heroes of the Wars of the Roses. He was a contemporary of Lewys Glyn Cothi, and they frequently wrote of the same people, with the benefit that one poet often supplements the other in clarifying relations of local families.

Although Ieuan, like Lewys, was able to flatter his patrons, he was unfortunate enough to anger two who were worthy of reconciliation. And indeed he humbles himself in seeking that reconciliation. At the same time this presents a perfect opportunity for him to paint a picture of the slanderer:

Dau dafod a'm hathrodant
Ag yn yr un genau yr ânt.
Mwyn o beth i'm wyneb oedd
Ymlidiwr i'm ol ydoedd.

Translation:

Two tongues of me they do detract,
And in the same mouth they move.
What was value to my face
Has become my persecutor.

Fortunately the poet was successful enough in his work to have his poetry survive the ravages of time.

== Origins ==
Ieuan was from Pendeulwyn in Llangynnwr parish in the Welshry of Cydweli (Kidwelly) commote in Carmarthenshire. From this place he took his penname. While Ieuan Deulwyn has become the standardized version of the poet's name, his name appears in the copies of his poetry in various forms, including Ieuan Deulwyn, Ieuan Daylwyn, Ieuan Deylwyn, and Evan o Dewlwyn. In pedigrees his name appears as “Evan Daylwyn thelder,” “Duyland als. tobushe,” and “dwyland to bushe,”, the latter designations derived from the English translation of deulwyn, i.e. two bushes. It is emphasized in the pedigrees because at least one of Ieuan's sons adopted the surname Bush on establishing himself in England, and it was this branch of the family that sought out the heralds to establish the pedigree.

== Ancestors ==
In the 16th century John Bushe of Dilton, Wiltshire, came to the Clarenceux King of Arms, probably William Harvey, and required of him to search his records to identify how he [John] was descended of “dwyland to bushe”. The Clarenceux discovered that John Bushe was the son and heir of John Bushe, the son and heir of William Bushe and his wife (a daughter of Strange of Gloucester), which William Bushe was son and heir to “dwyland to bushe” of the county of Carmarthen, who married Cecily, daughter of “Thos. Ryde (Thomas Rede) of Rodes Court by Talcarne” in the county of Carmarthen.

That “dwyland to bushe,” is Ieuan Deulwyn is made clear by another manuscript that equates the Bushe and Daylwyn pedigrees. This pedigree identifies Ieuan as “Evan Daylwyn theelder,” son of David Daylwyn, son of John, son of Gryffith, son of Meredith, son of Gruffith, son of Cadwgan Fychan, son of Cadwgan Fawr. This Cadwgan Fawr was born about AD 1200, and “had the house of” Maenor Cadwgan, one of the commotes in the Welshry of the Lordship of Kidwelly in medieval times.

Ieuan's ancestry can be traced even further back since Cadwgan Fawr was a descendant of the tribal patriarch Llywelyn ap Gwrgan, whose paternal line traces back to the 6th-century Pliws “Hen”, king of Dyfed.

== Descendants ==
Ieuan Deulwyn and his wife Cecily Rede had at least four children: Ieuan (John) the younger, William, Thomas and Elen.

=== Ieuan the younger ===
Ieuan the younger might be John Bushe, a 15th-century wool merchant in Northleach, Gloucestershire. His merchant's mark contains a clear “2B” designation, and his descendants are associated with some of the same families as William's descendants.

=== William Bushe ===
William's line is the one identified in the pedigrees. His descendants include such notable figures as Paul Bush, first Protestant bishop of Bristol, Charles Kendal Bushe, Lord Chief Justice of the King's Bench for Ireland, Admiral Sir John Bush (Royal Navy officer), and the current monarch of Great Britain. That the name is Elizabeth is clarified by Gervase Bushe in his entry at June Ferguson's Royal Genealogy Page

=== Elen ferch Ieuan Deulwyn ===
Elen married Hywel ap Maredudd of Cromlech, Llanfechell, Anglesey, and a fairly extensive list of at least one line of her descendants is documented.

=== Thomas ap Ieuan Deulwyn and others ===
Thomas ap John Dylwyn appears as a witness to a 1490 deed in Brecon, although no more is known of him. Other descendants of Ieuan Deulwyn remained in Carmarthenshire, as evidenced by a 1609 survey of freeholders in the Welshry of Kidwelly.

== Life ==
Given the dates of his poetry and the dates of birth of his children it is most likely he was born at some date between 1425 and 1435 and died around 1490, but no exact dates are recorded. Ieuan Deulwyn is seven generations removed from Cadwgan Fawr who was born about 1200. He had grandchildren born in the 1480s, and possibly some as early as the 1450s, which puts Ieuan's birth in the early part of the 15th century.

As a descendant of Cadwgan Fawr, Ieuan was a distant cousin to his neighbour Gruffydd Dwnn, with whom he may have served in the French Wars in the first half of the 15th century. Howell Evans attributes poetry written to the Welsh hero Mathew Gough to Ieuan Deulwyn. No such poem appears in Williams’ collection, but if Ieuan did write a poem during the lifetime of Mathew Gough, it would date his earliest poetry prior to 1450.

Ieuan Deulwyn's name appears in a 1460 commission attributed to Edward IV to look into the lineage of the Herberts, in which the poet is said to be one of the four 'cheyffest men of skill within the provynce of Sowth Wallys,' presumably in regard to genealogy. However, Sir Samuel Meyrick demonstrates that the commission is spurious.

Professor Ifor Williams suggests his poetry dates between about 1466 and 1488, with the latter date being “questionable.” He is said to have presided at the Glamorgan Gorsedd in 1480, although that is also questioned. In any case Ieuan is generally believed to have died no later than 1500. He lived and wrote, then, during the Wars of the Roses. He is styled a “fervent supporter to the men of York” by his editor, Ifor Williams, but a closer look at the subjects of his poems reveals that his devotion is more to family and country than to a political faction. He criticized Bedo Brwynllys for playing it both ways with regards to the political factions, yet Ieuan himself composed poetry for both Lancastrians and Yorkists, as can be seen graphically in the accompanying figure. The boxes identify subjects of Ieuan's poetry. The red roses identify people who supported the House of Lancaster (Tudors), and the white roses identify people who supported the House of York (Herberts). As Evans writes, referring to the bards of the 15th century:

“They sing the glory of a Tudor or a Herbert according as each rises to eminence, and bids fair to become a national leader. Nor can it be said that they exposed themselves to a charge of apostasy if their panegyrics thus alternated between the one and the other. They were consistent in their nationalism.”.

This nationalism took the form of opposition to the English, or the Saxon, as the Welsh referred to them. Indicative is his appeal to Sir Richard Herbert to “lock the door of privilege against the Saxon”. In his poem, "I Ferch a'i Gwallt" (To a Woman and Her Hair), Ieuan suggests half-jokingly, that his love should not love him more than a “deceitful Englishman.” And in his elegy to Sir Richard Herbert, Ieuan refers to the English as the children of Alis, which the Reverend Ellis notes means the children of Hell.

Sir Richard Herbert of Coldbrook, near Abergavenny, was Ieuan's principal patron, but he was in the homes of many of the most influential figures in South Wales.

Although not of the stature of his cousins, the Dwnns, Ieuan Deulwyn was not a poor man. The 1609 freeholder survey in Kidwelly confirms that he had property that passed through several generations. His son William was a gentleman and his daughter Elen married well. In marrying Cecily Rede, Ieuan himself married a woman of “one of the most notable of burghal families”. In “I Ferch a’i Gwallt” Ieuan praises “the girl I am going to ask for myself as a gift,” which may refer to Cecily. He alludes to the stature of her family:

Her father is like Hu Gadarn [a figure from the Mabinogion];
Great is his concern about a husband for his daughter.
He will never give her in a red-gold girdle
To anyone except the same kind of gold.

He expresses some reservations:

I do not go to ask for my lady
For fear of these [her notable family].

But then, he exclaims:

Seize me; contemn me!
My request for her was right.

Cecily Rede certainly did come from a notable family. Her father was Thomas Rede, a merchant who was connected with some of the most influential families in South Wales, and her mother (or at least step-mother), was Elen, daughter of the powerful Gruffudd ap Nicholas.

Ieuan's death is undocumented. There is some evidence he wrote a poem as late as 1488, but that date is questioned. He is named with Dafydd Nanmor in an elegy of Dafydd ab Edmwnd by Tudur Aled as if the three died at about the same time, which is believed to be about 1490. Yet among his collected works there is no poem about the decisive Battle of Bosworth, which took place in 1485. His wife's cousin, Sir Rhys ap Thomas, played an important role in the battle, which led to him being knighted on the field. Ieuan knew Rhys ap Thomas well, and sang his praises, but there is no mention of his exploits at Bosworth. It is possible Ieuan was dead before the battle took place.
