= Richard Herbert of Coldbrook =

Welsh knight

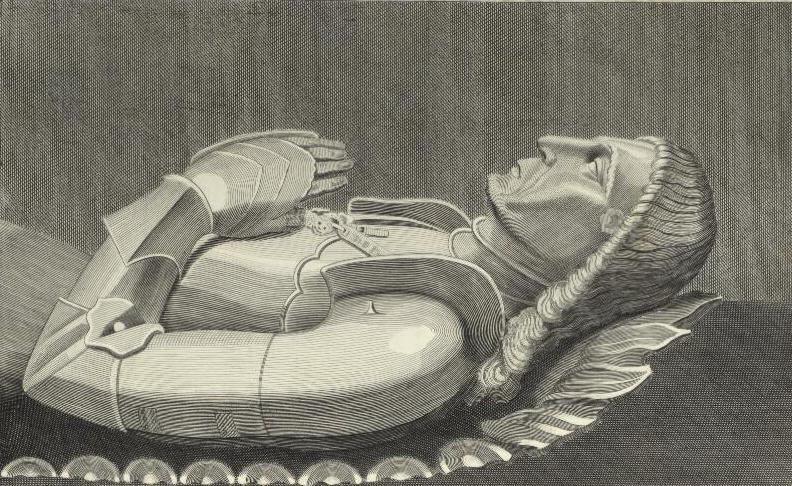
Monumental effigy of Richard Herbert

Sir Richard Herbert (died 1469) of Coldbrook Park, near Abergavenny, was a 15th-century Welsh knight, and the lineal ancestor of the Herberts of Chirbury.

He was the son of William ap Thomas of Raglan Castle and Gwladys ferch Dafydd Gam, and the brother of William Herbert, Earl of Pembroke. He married Margaret, sister of Sir Rhys ap Thomas. They had two sons: Sir William Herbert of Coldbrook, and Sir Richard Herbert of Powys. His great-grandson, Edward Herbert, was raised to the peerage in 1629.

Like many members of the Welsh gentry, Herbert was a notable bardic patron. He was the principal patron of Ieuan Deulwyn, and was also a patron of Guto'r Glyn as well as others. He hosted a bardic debate at Coldbrook House between Deulwyn and Bedo Brwynllys. He was eulogized by Ieuan Deulwyn, Bedo Brwynllys, Hywel Dafi, and (jointly with his brother William) Huw Cae Llwyd.

Like his brother, he was a supporter of the House of York during the Wars of the Roses. He fought alongside his brother at the Battle of Edgcote (a victory for rebels who supported the Earl of Warwick and the Duke of Clarence), where he was captured and executed. He is interred with his wife at Abergavenny Priory, near other members of his family.

== Bibliography ==
- Coxe, William (1801). A Historical Tour Through Monmouthshire. Hereford: Davies & Co.
- Dwnn, Lewys (1613). Heraldic Visitations of Wales and Part of the Marches Between 1586 and 1613. Llandovery: Welsh MSS. Society.
- Wilkins, Charles (1884). The Red Dragon: The National Magazine of Wales (vol. 5). Cardiff: Daniel Owen & Co.
