= Bettws =

Geographical disambiguation of Bettws/Betws

Betws or Bettws /ˈbɛtuːs/ may refer to:

== Places ==
- Bettws, Bridgend, Wales
- Bettws, Newport, Wales
- Bettws Cedewain, Montgomeryshire, Powys, Wales
- Bettws Newydd, Monmouthshire, Wales
- Bettws-y-Crwyn, Shropshire, England
- Betws Bledrws, Llangybi, Ceredigion, Wales
- Betws Diserth, Radnorshire, Wales
- Betws Garmon, Gwynedd, Wales
- Betws Gwerfil Goch, Denbighshire, Wales
- Betws Ifan, Ceredigion, Wales
- Betws yn Rhos, Conwy, Wales
- Betws, Carmarthenshire, Wales
  - Betws, Carmarthenshire (electoral ward)
- Betws-y-Coed, Conwy County Borough, Wales
- Capel Betws Lleucu, Cardiganshire, Wales
- Comins Capel Betws, a Site of Special Scientific Interest in Ceredigion, Wales

== Sports teams ==
- Bettws F.C., a football team in Bettws, Bridgend, Wales
- Betws RFC, a rugby team in Betws, Carmarthenshire, Wales
- Bettws RFC, a rugby team in Bettws, Newport, Wales
