= Bedo Hafesp =

16th-century Welsh poet

Bedo Hafesp (fl. 1568–1585) was a Welsh poet from Montgomeryshire.

A large scale eisteddfod, festival of traditional bardic crafts, was held for the second time in 1568 at Caerwys, as authorized by Queen Elizabeth I. Hafesp was a top ranked competitor there. He wrote poems about important community members, including memorials to Siôn Gruffydd of Llŷn (1585) and Dafydd ap Dafydd Llwyd.

His surname was derived from a place, Aberhafesp, a parish in Montgomeryshire.
