= Beddoes =

Beddoes is a surname of Welsh origin. Notable people with the name include:

- Alex Beddoes (born 1995), athlete from the Cook Islands
- Clayton Beddoes (born 1970), Canadian ice hockey coach and player
- Dick Beddoes (c. 1926–1991), Canadian sports journalist
- Emma Beddoes (born 1985), English squash player
- Ivor Beddoes (1909–1981), British matte painter, costume and set designer, and artist
- Lance Beddoes (born 1992), New Zealand squash player
- Mick Beddoes, Fijian politician and businessman
- Ronald Beddoes (1912–2000), Anglican priest
- Thomas Beddoes (1760–1808), English physician and scientific writer
- Thomas Lovell Beddoes (1803–1849), English poet, dramatist and physician
- Zanny Minton Beddoes (born 1967), British journalist

== See also ==
- Bedo (disambiguation)
- Beddoe
