= Swoop (airline) =

Ultra low-cost airline of Canada (2017–2023)

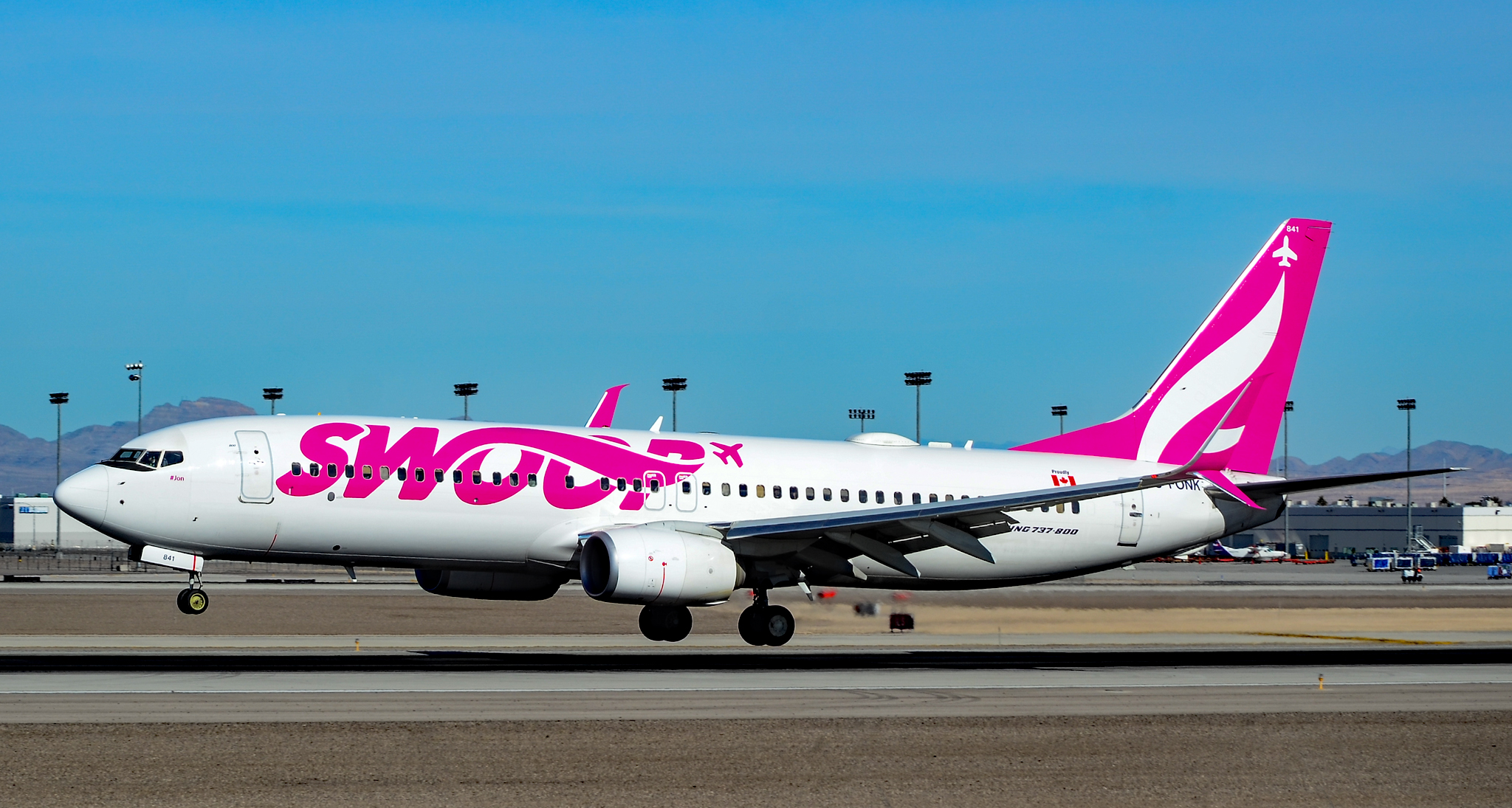
- Swoop Boeing 737-800 at Las Vegas
IATA	ICAO	Call sign
WO	WSW	SWOOP
- Founded: September 27, 2017
- Commenced operations: June 20, 2018
- Ceased operations: October 28, 2023 (re-integrated into WestJet)
- AOC #: Canada 18771; United States 5OOF541F
- Operating bases: Abbotsford; Edmonton; Hamilton (ON); Toronto–Pearson; Winnipeg
- Parent company: WestJet
- Headquarters: Calgary, Alberta, Canada

Swoop was a Canadian ultra low-cost airline owned by WestJet. The airline was headquartered in Calgary, Alberta and was named after WestJet's desire to "swoop" (or jump) into the Canadian market with a new business model. It was officially announced on September 27, 2017, and began flights on June 20, 2018. The airline had bases In Hamilton (ON), Toronto–Pearson, Winnipeg, Edmonton, and Abbotsford. However, Swoop’s bases in Winnipeg and Edmonton closed on October 20, 2023; the Toronto base closed a few days later on October 25. Swoop was integrated into WestJet’s mainline operation on October 28, 2023.

== History ==
In April 2017, WestJet announced that it was planning to launch a new airline to enter the growing ultra low-cost carrier (ULCC) market and compete against NewLeaf (now Flair Airlines). This date coincided with the announcement that WestJet's pilots would be voting on joining the Air Line Pilot's Association. The airline was planned to launch in late 2017, but in August 2017, it was delayed to June 2018 after switching to a lower-cost booking system. The delay also allowed WestJet to reconfigure aircraft for Swoop over the spring 2018 season.

Swoop management received some criticism for failing to consult the Urban Dictionary prior to selecting the name. Additionally, the marketing department received extensive criticism for a suggestive advertisement with the caption, "Keep it in your Pants" [ie money]. Employees pointed out that the advertisement ran afoul of the corporate sexual harassment policy, and had an employee made such a comment, they would have faced discipline.

Swoop was officially announced on September 27, 2017, and was expected to have base fares 40% lower than WestJet's fares. It was announced that Swoop would launch with six Boeing 737-800 aircraft. Tickets first became available for sale on February 1, 2018. Following its announcement, WestJet announced that Swoop's flights would not be based in Calgary, but in another nearby market such as Edmonton, Abbotsford, Hamilton or Winnipeg. On February 1, 2018, Swoop officially began selling tickets to the public, announcing John C. Munro Hamilton International Airport as its main base and Edmonton International Airport as its western base.

On June 20, 2018, Swoop officially launched with two Boeing 737-800 aircraft in its fleet. The first flight was from John C. Munro Hamilton International Airport to Abbotsford International Airport, with passengers paying an average of $103 for the flight. Winnipeg James Armstrong Richardson International Airport, Edmonton International Airport, and Halifax Stanfield International Airport were also launch destinations. The fleet of two aircraft was planned to be expanded to six by the end of 2018 and to 10 in 2019.

On August 2, 2018, Swoop announced that it was to become the first Canadian ultra low-cost airline to fly to the United States, launching service to Las Vegas, Phoenix (Mesa), Tampa, Orlando, and Fort Lauderdale throughout the month of October 2018. However, prior to launching service in October, Swoop announced service to four more Mexican and Caribbean destinations launching in December 2018 and January 2019; Puerto Vallarta, Montego Bay, Cancun and Mazatlan. On October 20, 2018, Swoop delayed launch of its flights to the United States until October 27, 2018, due to its lack of U.S. federal approvals. Starting from April and May 2019, Swoop began launching service to London and Kelowna. On June 24, 2019, Swoop announced Los Cabos as a new destination, which commenced in November 2019. On December 19, 2019, Swoop announced three new summer seasonal destinations including Victoria, Kamloops, and one U.S. destination, San Diego. On January 9, 2020, Swoop expanded its East Coast network with three new destinations to St. John's, Charlottetown, and Moncton. In October 2020, Swoop switched its eastern base to Toronto Pearson International Airport.

Swoop's attempts to hire non-unionized pilots from abroad to circumvent the pilot's collective agreement negotiations led to a turbulent relationship with its pilots. In retaliation for attempting to circumvent the union, ALPA declared a "recruitment ban" resulting in WestJet filing an unfair labour practice complaint against ALPA before the Canada Industrial Relations Board. The Complaint was resolved with ALPA rescinding the hiring ban and Swoop being declared a "Single Employer" with WestJet and Swoop pilots placed within the same bargaining unit as WestJet pilots.

In February 2022, Swoop announced that it would add 6 Boeing 737 MAX aircraft to its fleet, subsequently announcing that it planned to begin operating the aircraft during June 2022.

On June 9, 2023, WestJet announced that consistent with its new Collective Agreement with the Air Line Pilots Association, Swoop would be integrated into WestJet and shut down at the end of its current published schedule on October 28, 2023. Despite saving millions on labour costs, Swoop was unable to sustain any profit.

== Destinations ==
Prior to October 28, 2023, Swoop's route network consisted of destinations across North America and the Caribbean. The airline focused on point-to-point flying and did not offer connections. The airline additionally had an agreement with Sunwing Travel Group that allowed passengers out of Hamilton, Abbotsford, Winnipeg and Edmonton to book Sunwing vacation packages with Swoop flights.

== Fleet ==
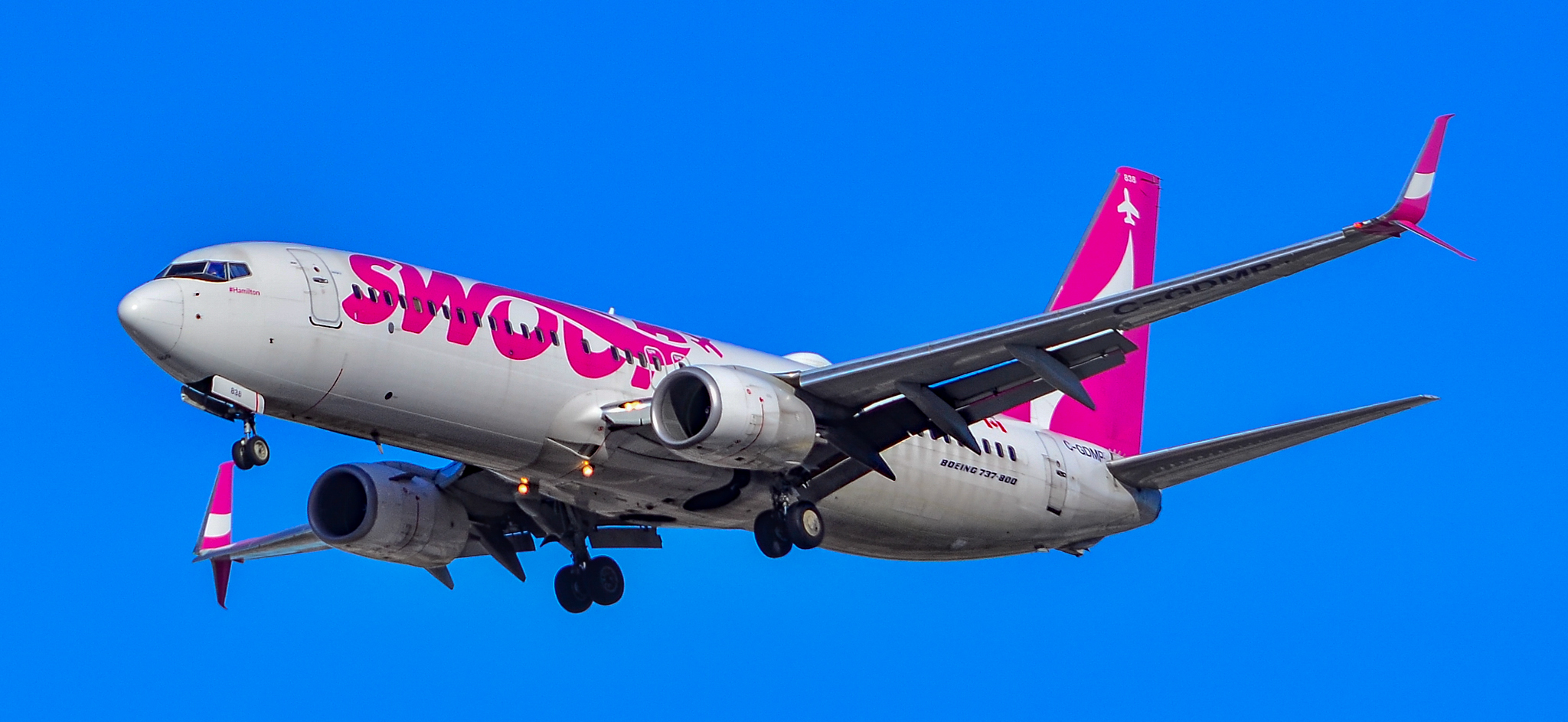
Swoop Boeing 737-800

As of 27 October 2023, Swoop operated an all-Boeing 737 fleet composed of the following aircraft:

Swoop fleet
Aircraft	In service	Orders	Passengers	Notes
Boeing 737-800	10	—	189	All aircraft transferred to WestJet.
Boeing 737 MAX 8	6	—	189	All aircraft transferred to WestJet.
Total	16	—		

=== Livery ===
Swoop's fleet of aircraft was painted with the Swoop logo large across the fuselage, and a pink tail with a white line leading up to a silhouette of an aircraft. The winglets were painted in a similar pattern to the tail, pink with a white stripe through it. This pattern was the same on the inside and outside of the winglets. Each aircraft was given a name painted in pink below the windows of the cockpit on both sides of the aircraft.
