= Dafydd ap Dafydd Llwyd =

Welsh poet (born 1549)

Dafydd ap Dafydd Llwyd (born 1549) was a Welsh poet. His father was Dafydd Llwyd ab Ieuan.

His works include poems written to Gilbert Humphrey of Cefn Digoll, Mont. (1596), Dr David Powel, Siôn Huws of Maes y Pandy, near Talyllyn, and also some Ymrysonau (bardic debates) between himself and Roger Cyffin (and also with Lewys Dwnn). He also wrote a number of religious and moral poems.

Thomas Lloyd is his great-grandson. David Lloyd is a relative, though the exact relation is unknown.
