= Bedo =

- Village
- Location in Haiti
- Coordinates: 18°16′55″N 73°39′12″W
- Country: Haiti
- Department: Sud
- Arrondissement: Aquin
- Elevation: 18 m (59 ft)

Bedo is a village in the Cavaellon commune of the Aquin Arrondissement, in the Sud department of Haiti.
