= Lewys Dwnn =

Lewys Dwnn (c. 1550–1616) was a Welsh poet and Welsh genealogist. Also known as Lewys ap Rhys ab Owain. Lewys Dwnn originated from Bettws Cedewain in Montgomeryshire and claimed descent from a David Dwnn of Kidwelly.

== Welsh genealogist ==
Lewys Dwnn composed many Welsh pedigrees and genealogical manuscripts which survive to this day and offer a valuable insight into the lineage of medieval bards and poets, some probably known to him and some of the generation preceding his. These are now found in both the British Museum and the National Library of Wales.

== Welsh official ==
In 1585 Lewys Dwnn achieved the official title of deputy to Robert Cooke, a Clarenceux King-of-Arms to Elizabeth I.

== Prolific poet ==
Lewys Dwnn was also a particularly prolific poet, with many surviving works of Medieval Welsh literature.

== Literature ==
- Lewys Dwnn Heraldic Visitations of Wales and Part of the Marches. Edited by Sir Samuel Rush Merrick, Welsh MSS Society, Llandovery 1846, reprinted Bridge Books, Wrexham 2005
