= Bedo Brwynllys =

15th-century Welsh poet

Bedo Brwynllys (fl. c. 1460) was a Welsh-language poet or bard.

== Life ==
He lived in the Bronllys area near Talgarth in Brycheiniog.

Bedo was a love poet in the tradition of Dafydd ap Gwilym whose work is sometimes mis-assigned to Bedo Aeddren.

He composed an Elegy for Sir Richard Herbert of Coldbrook. He also composed some flyting poems between himself and Hywel Dafi and Ieuan Deulwyn, two contemporaries, and some surviving religious poetry has also been ascribed to him.
