= Capel Betws Lleucu =

Village in Ceredigion, Wales

Coordinates: 52.205°N 4.041°W

Capel Betws Lleucu (also spelt Capel Betws Leucu) is a hamlet in Cardiganshire, Wales.

It is the location of St Lucia's Chapel.

SY postcode area SY 25 6 SN606583
