= Bedo Aeddren =

Welsh poet (active c. 1500)

Bedo Aeddren (fl. c. 1500) was a Welsh language poet from the area that is now Denbighshire, north-east Wales.

Bedo composed poems on themes of love and nature in the tradition of Dafydd ap Gwilym and other cywyddwyr.
