= Sean Durfy =

Canadian businessman

Sean Durfy (born 1963) is a Canadian businessman born in Corner Brook, Newfoundland. He is currently the chief executive officer of Ascendant Group Limited in Bermuda, which is the parent company of Bermuda Electric Light Company Limited (BELCO).

Durfy is the former president and chief executive officer of WestJet and was responsible for the day-to-day operations of Canada's second largest airline. Durfy joined WestJet in 2004 as executive vice-president, sales, marketing and airports. He became WestJet's president in 2006 and added the title of CEO in 2007. On March 15, 2010, Durfy announced that he was resigning from his position at WestJet, which included stepping down from the board of directors. He noted personal reasons for his resignation. His resignation was effective April 1, 2010, but he had planned to stay on until September 1, 2010 to help ease the transition.

Durfy has held positions at General Motors Super Group, MacLaren Lintas, Honeywell Limited and TransAlta Energy before his tenure with ENMAX Energy Corporation as president and chief operating officer.

Durfy earned a Bachelor of Commerce degree from Dalhousie University with a major in Marketing and Finance.

Directorships:

- Board member - Ascendant Group Limited
- Board member - Touchstone Exploration Ltd.
- Board member - Northland Power Inc (observer)
- Corporate Secretary - Rodeo Capital II
