= Meredith (surname) =

Meredith is a Welsh surname. Notable people with the surname include:

== A ==
- Adam Meredith (1913–1976), British bridge player
- Amaza Lee Meredith (1895–1984), American architect, educator and artist
- Andrew Meredith (born 1972), field hockey coach
- Anna Meredith (born 1978), British musician and composer

== B ==
- Bevan Meredith (1927–2019), Anglican Archbishop of Papua New Guinea
- Billy Meredith (1874–1958), Welsh footballer
- Bryn Meredith, Welsh rugby union player
- Burgess Meredith, American actor

== C ==
- Carew Arthur Meredith, Anglo-Irish mathematician and logician
- Carole Meredith, American grape geneticist
- Charles Meredith (disambiguation), multiple people
- Cla Meredith, Major League Baseball pitcher for the San Diego Padres
- Courtenay Meredith (1926–2024), Welsh rugby union player

== D ==
- Don Meredith, American football player and sportscaster; quarterback for the Dallas Cowboys
- Dorothy Meredith (1906–1986) was an American artist and educator, known for fiber art.

== E ==
- Edmund Allen Meredith, Canadian politician and principal of McGill University, Montréal
- Edward Meredith, English religious writer
- Edwin Thomas Meredith, United States Secretary of Agriculture under Woodrow Wilson
- Ellis Meredith (1865–1955), American novelist

== F ==
- Frederick Edmund Meredith, 8th Chancellor of Bishop's University, Lennoxville
- Frederick William Meredith, Aircraft research engineer and Soviet espionage agent

== G ==
- Geechie Meredith, American baseball player
- George Meredith, 19th century English author

== H ==
- Hilary Meredith British solicitor and professor

== I ==
- Ifan Meredith, Welsh actor

== J ==
- Jack R. Meredith, American engineer and organizational theorist
- James Meredith, first African American student at the University of Mississippi
- James Meredith (footballer) (born 1988), Australian football (soccer) player
- James Meredith (Medal of Honor), American Medal of Honor recipient
- James Creed Meredith, Irish lawyer, judge and Kant scholar
- Sir James Creed Meredith, Irish prominent Freemason
- Jamon Meredith (born 1986), American football player
- John Nelson Meredith (1892–1971), British architect
- John Meredith (rugby union), Welsh rugby union player
- John Walsingham Cooke Meredith, father of the 'Eight London Merediths'
- Jonathan Meredith, United States Marine during the First Barbary War
- Jordan Meredith (born 1998), American football player

== L ==
- Lois Meredith (1898–1967), stage and movie actress

== M ==
- Martin Meredith, British writer

== R ==
- Ralph Creed Meredith, Anglo-Irish clergyman, chaplain to George VI
- Richard Meredith (bishop), 16th century Anglo-Irish Bishop of Leighlin and Ferns
- Richard Edmund Meredith, Master of the Rolls in Ireland
- Richard Martin Meredith, Canadian chief justice
- Riley Meredith, Australian cricketer

== S ==
- Sir Roger Meredith, 5th Baronet
- Samuel Meredith (disambiguation)
- Stephen M. Meredith (1802–1874), American politician and physician from Pennsylvania

== T ==
- Ted Meredith, winner of two gold medals at the 1912 Summer Olympics
- Thomas Meredith, Anglo-Irish clergyman and mathematician
- Thomas Graves Meredith, Canadian lawyer and businessman

== V ==
- Sir Vincent Meredith, 1st Baronet of Montreal, President of the Bank of Montreal

== W ==
- Sir William Collis Meredith, Chief Justice of the Superior Court of the province of Quebec
- William Campbell James Meredith, Canadian lawyer
- William M. Meredith, Secretary of the Treasury of the United States
- William Morris Meredith, Jr., American poet
- Sir William Ralph Meredith, Canadian chief justice and leader of the conservative party
- Winifred Barbara Meredith (1895–1979), Australian medical practitioner

== See also ==
- Meredith (given name)
