= USS Meredith =

Four United States Navy ships have borne the name Meredith, in honor of Jonathan Meredith.

- USS Meredith (DD-165), was a Wickes-class destroyer commissioned in 1919 and scrapped in 1936
- USS Meredith (DD-434), was a Gleaves-class destroyer commissioned 1 March 1941 and sunk 15 October 1942
- USS Meredith (DD-726), was an Allen M. Sumner-class destroyer commissioned 14 March 1944 and sunk 9 June 1944
- USS Meredith (DD-890), was a Gearing-class destroyer commissioned 31 December 1945 and transferred to Turkey in 1979
