= Meredith =

Meredith is a name of Welsh origin. A family name, it is also sometimes used as a girl's or boy's forename. In Welsh the name is exclusively male and is spelt Maredudd or Meredydd.

== People ==
- Meredith (given name)
- Meredith (surname)

== Places ==
=== Australia ===
- Meredith, Victoria

=== United States ===
- Meredith, Colorado
- Lake Meredith (Colorado)
- Meredith, Michigan
- Meredith, New Hampshire, a New England town
  - Meredith (CDP), New Hampshire, the main village in the town
- Meredith, New York
- Meredith Township, Cloud County, Kansas
- Meredith Township, Wake County, North Carolina
- Lake Meredith, reservoir formed by a dam on the Canadian River at Sanford, Texas

== Ships ==
- HMS Meredith (1763), sloop of the British Royal Navy purchased in 1763 and sold in 1784
- USCS Meredith, survey ship in United States Coast Survey service from 1851 to 1872
- USS Meredith, the name of more than one United States Navy ship
- SS Meredith Victory, United States Merchant Marine Victory ship

== Other ==
- Meredith College, women's liberal arts college located in Raleigh, North Carolina
- Meredith Corporation
- Dotdash Meredith, which publishes Better Homes and Gardens in the U.S.
- Meredith Music Festival near Meredith, Victoria, Australia
- Meredith v. Jefferson County Board of Education, a 2007 United States Supreme Court decision striking down a racial desegregation plan in Jefferson County, Kentucky
