= James Meredith (disambiguation) =

James Meredith (born 1933) was the first African-American student at the University of Mississippi.

James Meredith may also refer to:

- James Meredith (Medal of Honor) (1872–1915), United States Marine sergeant and Medal of Honor recipient
- James Meredith (soccer) (born 1988), Australian soccer player
- James Creed Meredith (1875–1942), Irish lawyer and judge
- James Creed Meredith (baronet) (1842–1912), Irish Freemason
- James Hargrove Meredith (1914–1988), U.S. federal judge
- Jamon Meredith (James Jamon Meredith, born 1986), American football player
- Ted Meredith (James Edwin Meredith, 1891–1957), American Olympic runner

== See also ==
- Meredith (surname)
