= Samuel Johnson (pamphleteer) =

English clergyman and political writer

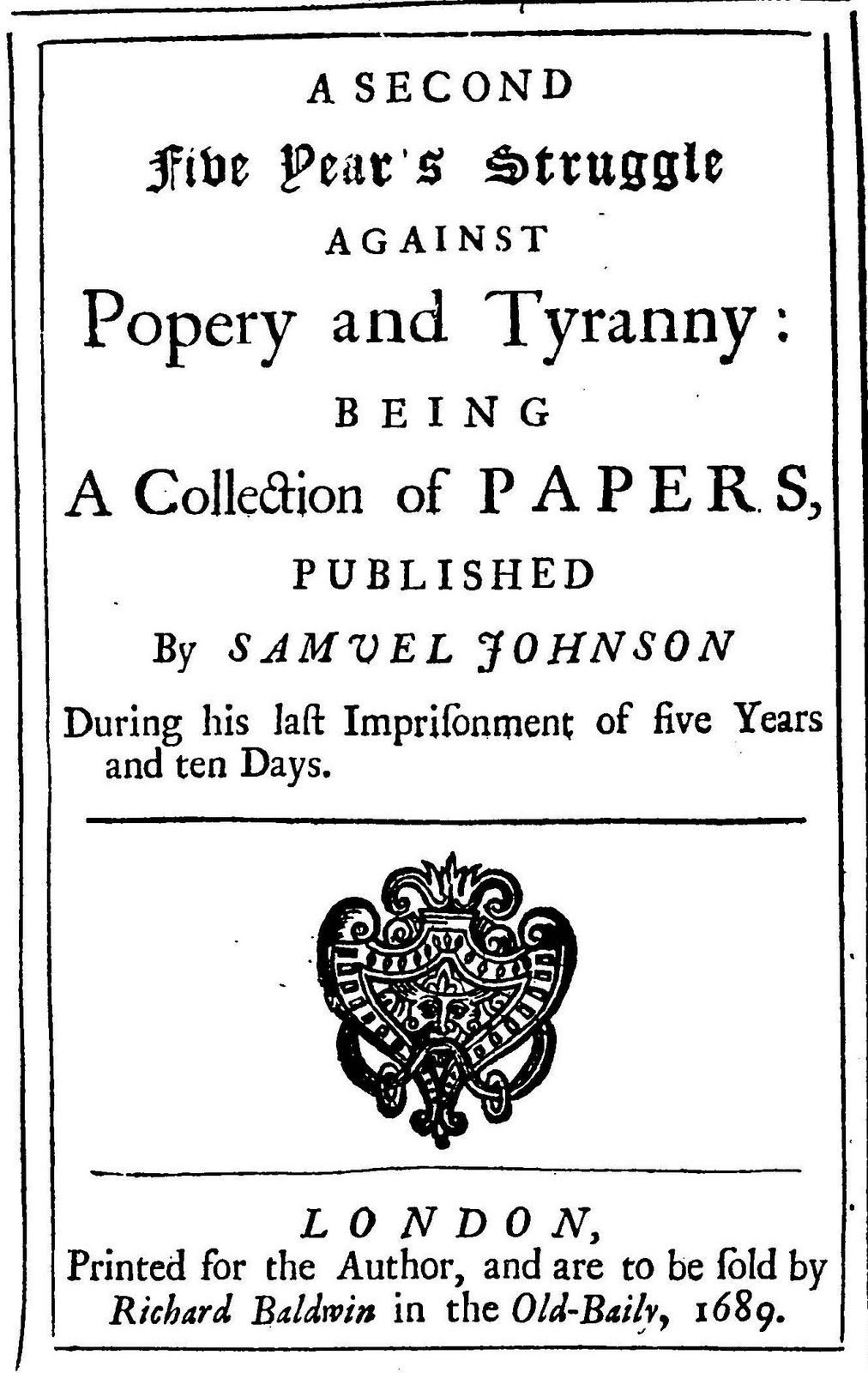
Frontispiece of a 1689 collection of works by Samuel Johnson

Samuel Johnson (1649–1703) was an English clergyman and political writer, sometimes called "the Whig Johnson" to distinguish him from the author and lexicographer of the same name, who was a Tory in politics and lived after him. He is one of the best known pamphlet writers who developed Whig resistance theory.

== Life ==
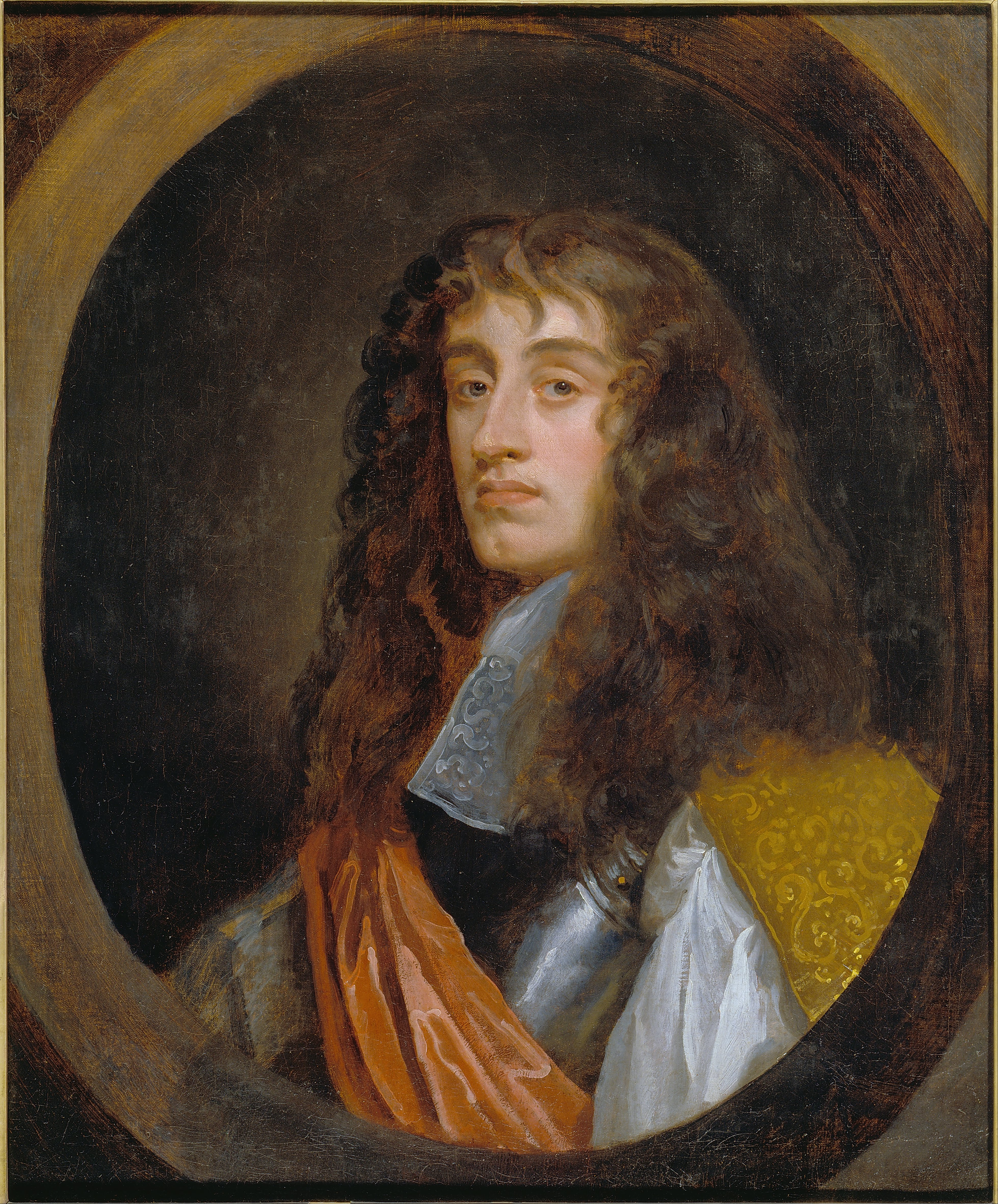
James II as Duke of York (early 1660s) by John Greenhill. Johnson was a critic of the Duke of York, who later ascended the throne as James II of England.

From a humble background, Samuel Johnson was educated at St. Paul's School and Trinity College, Cambridge, and took orders. He attacked James, Duke of York in Julian the Apostate (1682).

Johnson was illegally deprived of his orders, flogged, and imprisoned. He continued, however, his attacks on the Government by pamphlets, and did much to influence the public mind in favour of the Glorious Revolution of 1688. Dryden gave him a place in Absalom and Achitophel as "Benjochanan". After the Revolution he was restored to his orders and received a pension, but considered himself insufficiently rewarded by a deanery, which he declined. He was married for many years and suffered from many illnesses.

== The Julian tracts ==
Johnson's 1682 pamphlet Julian the Apostate was a reply to a sermon A Discourse of the Sovereign Power earlier the same year by George Hickes; it was printed by John Darby. With its sequels, it employed a technique of vilification by the use of parallels in classical literature. In 1683 he followed it with Julian's Arts, but the timing turned out badly, with the revelations of the Rye House Plot, and the pamphlet was held back.

Julian the Apostate met with seven published replies, as well as becoming the target of Oxford sermons. These included pamphlets from Hickes (Jovian), John Bennet (Constantius the Apostate), Edward Meredith, and Thomas Long. He was defended by William Atwood in A Letter of Remarks upon Jovian. William Sherlock backed up Jovian and passive obedience in Case of Resistance (1684).

== Whig partisan ==
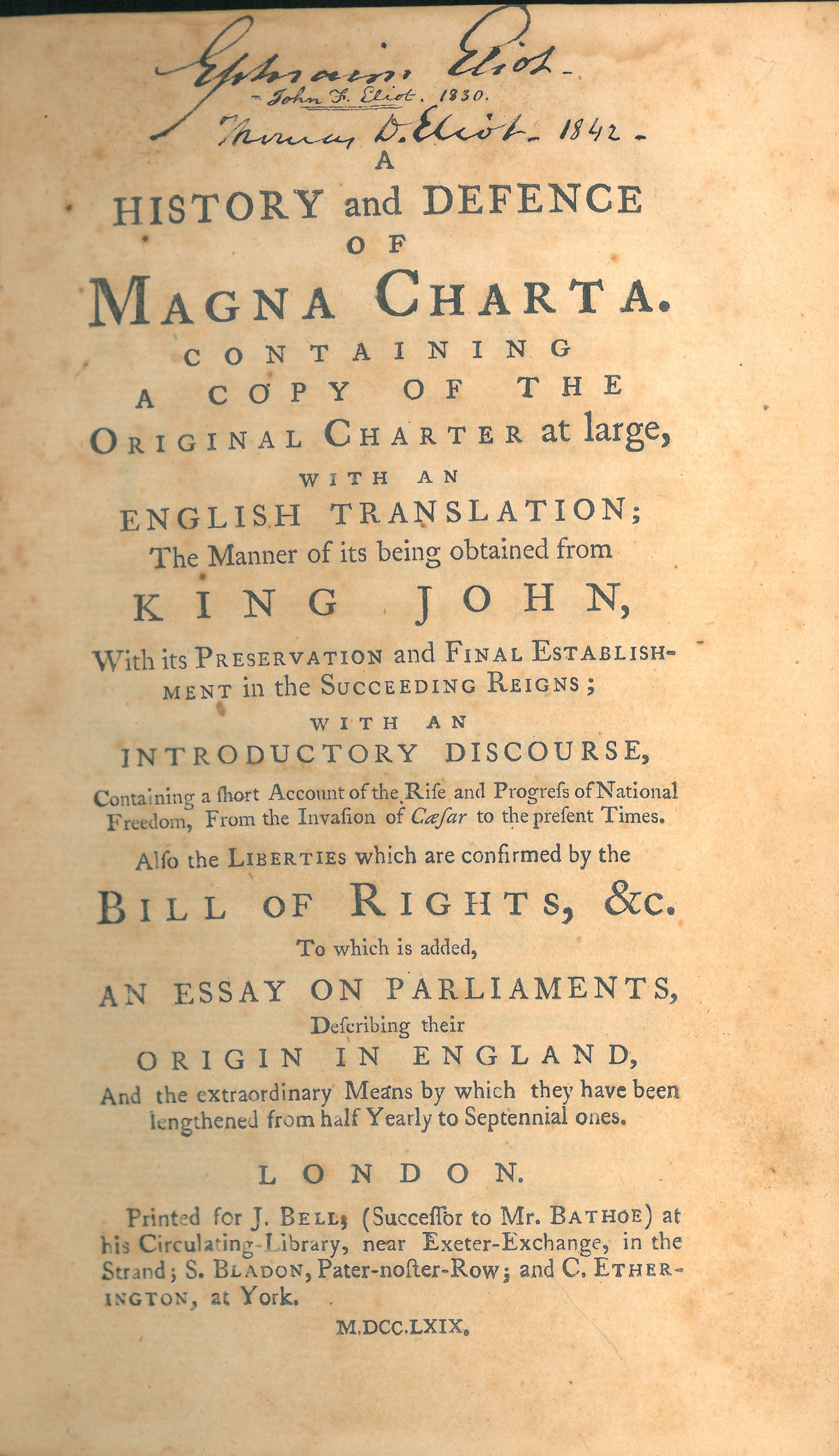
The title page of Johnson's A History and Defence of Magna Charta (1st edition, 1769)

Johnson was chaplain to Lord William Russell, a Whig leader, from 1679. Russell directed Johnson's attention to constitutional theory. The result of Johnson's researches was posthumously published in 1769 as A History and Defence of Magna Charta; a second edition appeared in 1772. Russell was later caught up in the Rye House trials. Russell's final speech before his execution was printed, and Johnson, Darby, and Gilbert Burnet were questioned about their involvement in its publication.
