= Merideth =

Merideth is a surname. Notable people with the surname include:

- Peter Merideth, American politician
- Sonny Merideth (1930–2017), American lawyer and politician

== See also ==
- Meredith (disambiguation)
- Merideth Boswell, American set decorator
