= Meredith (given name) =

English-language unisex given name of Welsh origin

- Pronunciation: /ˈmɛrədɪθ ˈmɛrɪdɪθ/ MERR-ə-dith; /mɛˈrɛdɪθ/ meh-RED-ith as if Welsh
- Gender: Unisex (primarily female; originally male)
- Language: English

Origin
- Language: Welsh
- Origin: Maredudd
- Meaning: 'Lord of the Sea'
- Region of origin: Wales

Other names
- Variant forms: Maredith; Maradyth; Merddith; Merydethe; Mredith; Maready; Redith; Merith
- Short form: Merry
- Related names: Bedo

Meredith is a Welsh given name, and a surname common in parts of Wales. As a personal name, it was historically usually given to boys, but it has more recently been given mainly to girls, especially outside Wales. Meredith has many derivatives that have also become personal names and surnames.

== Etymology and history ==
In Old Welsh (c. 800–1150), the name was usually rendered as Morgetuid or Margetiud. The exact meaning of the first element, Mere, is unclear, although some Welsh scholars have translated it as "great" or "splendid". The final element udd has the meaning of lord, and is found in other Welsh names such as Gruffydd and Bleidd[i]udd. However, in Middle Welsh (c. 1150s–1300s) the name was most commonly spelt as Maredud and Maredudd; "in Welsh, the accent is on the penult, and this leads at times to the elision of the vowel of the first syllable," producing an early variant Mredydd, according to T. J. Morgan and Prys Morgan. Anglo-Norman scribes often used e for the first syllable and substituting the double d with a th, producing Mereduth. The forms Meredith and Meredyth are seen as early as the 14th century.

In Medieval manuscripts, the name is frequently "disguised" in records produced by scribes unfamiliar with Welsh naming conventions, and has been confused with the Welsh name Moreiddig (which has produced Moredik, Moriddik, and Morithik). By the early Middle Ages, the name took the form of Mereduc, in part due to "its suitability for taking Latin case-endings". The name has been rendered into Latin as Mereducco, Mereduci, Mereduth, Mereduco, Mereduc, Mereducus, and Mereducius.

In the dialect of Dyfed (Pembrokeshire), the final voiced interdental fricative (represented in writing by dd) was lost to produce the name Meredy. Despite not having any etymological connection, Meredith has also been equated or associated with Merrick, Meyrick, and Moryce, "presumably on the basis of the 'Mer', although it is possible that Maurice was adopted as an approximation", according to Morgan and Morgan.

Various forms of the name include Maredith, Maradyth, Merddith, Merydethe, Mredith, Maready, and Redith. The surname "Merediz", found in the northern coastal region of Spain, particularly Asturias, is derived from it. The surname is also found in Argentina and Mexico.

== Derivatives ==
A derivative or pet name of Meredith is Bedo, which has given rise to a variety of other surnames, including: Beddas, Beddis, Beddus, Beddose, Beddos, Beddoe, Beddoes, Beddowe, Beado, Beddah, Beddow, Beddas, Beddass, with a deliberate anglicisation of Beddis/Beddus into Bedhouse. The forms Beddoe, Beddow, Beddoes, and Beddowes are particularly common within the Shropshire region of the Marches. The hardening characteristic of the Glamorgan and Monmouthshire accent mutated the d into t, producing Bettoe and Bettoes with the anglicised variant as Betthouse.

== Notable people ==
- Meredith Andrews (born 1983), American singer, songwriter, and worship leader (female)
- Meredith Artley, journalist and former editor-in-chief of CNN.com (female)
- Meredith Baxter (born 1947), American actress (female)
- Meredith Belbin (1926–2025), British management theorist (male)
- Meredith Brooks (born 1958), American musician (female)
- Meredith Burgmann (born 1947), Australian politician (female)
- Meredith Colket (1878–1947), American pole vault Olympic silver medal winner (male)
- Meredith Craig, American politician (female)
- Meredith Davies (1922–2005), British conductor (male)
- Meredith Emerson (1983–2008), American murder victim, Meredith Emerson Memorial Privacy Act (U.S.) (female)
- Meredith Etherington-Smith (1946–2020), British art and fashion journalist (female)
- Meredith "Med" Flory (1926–2014), American musician and actor (male)
- Meredith Frampton, (1894–1984), British painter (male)
- Meredith Poindexter Gentry (1809–1866), U.S. politician (male)
- Meredith Gourdine (1929–1998), American athlete, engineer and physicist (male)
- Meredith Hall (born 1949), American writer (female)
- Meredith G. Hastings, American atmospheric chemist (female)
- Meredith Curly Hunter Jr. (1951–1969), American man killed at the Altamont Free Concert (male)
- Meredith Lee Hughes, adopted as Lynda Bellingham (1948–2014), Canadian-born English actress and TV presenter (female)
- Meredith Hunter (politician) (born 1962), Australian politician (female)
- Meredith Kazer, American professor of nursing (female)
- Meredith Kercher (1985–2007), British woman murdered in Italy (female)
- Meredith MacRae, (1944–2000), American actress (female)
- Meredith Marks (born 1971), American television personality (female)
- Meredith Monk (born 1942), American composer and vocal performer (female)
- Meredith Salenger (born 1970), American actress (female)
- Meredith Shiels, American cancer epidemiologist (female)
- Meredith Stiehm (born 1969), American television producer and screenwriter (female)
- Meredith Tax (1942–2022), American writer (female)
- Meredith Vieira (born 1953), American journalist and television host (female)
- Meredith Whitney (born 1969), American businesswoman (female)
- Meredith Willson (1902–1984), American composer, songwriter, conductor, and playwright (male)
- O. Meredith Wilson (1909–1998), former President of the University of Minnesota (male)

== Fictional characters ==
- Meredith, a character from the 1974 film The Conversation, played by Elizabeth MacRae
- Meredith, a character in the Freeform network series Pretty Little Liars with whom the character Byron cheated on his girlfriend
- Meredith Blake, a character in the book Five Little Pigs by Agatha Christie
- Meredith Blake, a character from the 1998 film The Parent Trap, played by Elaine Hendrix
- Meredith Brody, NCIS: New Orleans, an NCIS agent newly transferred to New Orleans at the start of the first season who left at the start of the third season
- Meredith Bunter, butler to Lord Peter Wimsey in Thrones, Dominations; brother to Mervyn Bunter.
- Merry Gentry, the protagonist of the Meredith Gentry series by Laurell K. Hamilton
- Meredith Fell, a character on The CW's TV series The Vampire Diaries
- Meredith Gordon, a character in the TV series Heroes who was an evolved human with the power of pyrokinesis
- Meredith Grey, an attending general surgeon and Head of General Surgery in the TV medical drama Grey's Anatomy, played by Ellen Pompeo
- Meredith Rodney McKay, a character in the TV series Stargate SG-1 and Stargate Atlantis played by David Hewlett
- Meredith Monahan, a character in the Australian Broadcasting Corporation TV series SeaChange played by Jill Forster
- Meredith Palmer, a character in the NBC TV sitcom The Office who was Dunder-Mifflin's resident lush
- Meredith Pike, a character in the 2024 film Afraid
- Meredith Quill, a character in Guardians of the Galaxy, played by Laura Haddock
- Meredith Sulez, a character in The Vampire Diaries novel series by L. J. Smith
- Knight-Commander Meredith Stannard, a character in the Dragon Age II video game, by BioWare
- Meredith Smith, the title character of "The Meredith Smith" episode of the NBC western TV series Bonanza
- Meredith Vickers, a character in the 2012 film Prometheus
- Meredith Walker, a Banshee in the MTV series Teen Wolf who is an ally to the McCall Pack

== See also ==
- Maredudd
- Meredith (surname)
