= Merry (given name) =

As a given name, Merry may refer to:

- Merry Anders (1934–2012), American actress born Mary Helen Anderson
- Merry Clayton (born 1948), American soul and gospel singer
- Gladys Geissmann (1908–1978), better known as Merry Hull, American accessory designer credited with the "finger-free" glove
- Merry Lepper (born 1942), American long-distance runner acknowledged to have set a world record in the marathon in 1963
- Merry Lindsey, American cardiac physiologist
- Merry Brandybuck, a character in The Lord of the Rings
- Merry Pemberton, a DC Comics character
- Merry Riana (born 1980), Chinese-Indonesian motivational speaker, entrepreneur, and writer
- Merry Wiesner-Hanks, American historian

== See also ==
- Meredith (given name)
