= Charles Meredyth =

Charles Meredyth may refer to:

- Charles Meredyth (died 1700), Irish MP and Chancellor of the Exchequer of Ireland
- Charles Meredyth (died 1710), Irish MP for county Meath and Kells
- Charles Meredyth (priest) (died 1747), Dean of Ardfert

== See also ==
- Charles Meredith (disambiguation)
