= Edward Stillingfleet =

British Christian theologian and scholar (1635–1699)

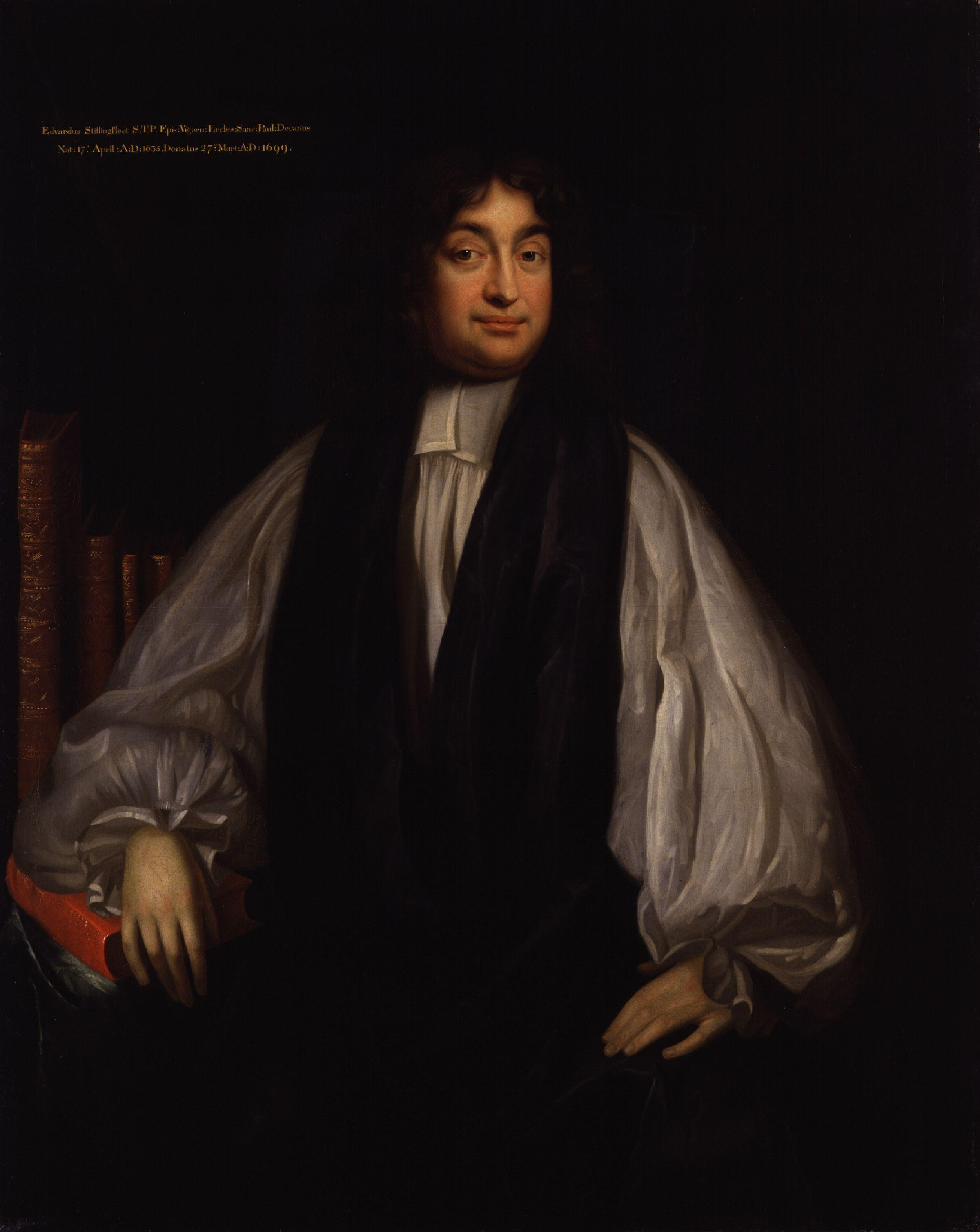
Portrait of Bishop Stillingfleet by Mary Beale, circa 1690

Edward Stillingfleet (17 April 1635 – 27 March 1699) was an English Christian theologian and scholar. Considered an outstanding preacher as well as a strong polemical writer defending Anglicanism, Stillingfleet was known as "the beauty of holiness" for his good looks in the pulpit, and was called by John Hough "the ablest man of his time".

== Life ==
Edward Stillingfleet was born at Cranborne, Dorset, seventh son of Samuel Stillingfleet (d. 1661), of Cranborne Lodge, Dorset, a member of a landowning family originally of Yorkshire, and his wife Susanna, daughter of Edward Norris, of Petworth, West Sussex. He went at the age of thirteen to St John's College, Cambridge, graduating B.A. in 1652, and became vicar of Sutton, Bedfordshire in 1657.

In 1665, after he had made his name as a writer, Stillingfleet became vicar at St Andrew, Holborn. He preached at St Margaret, Westminster on 10 October 1666, the 'day of humiliation and fasting' after the Great Fire of London, with such an attendance that there was standing room only. Samuel Pepys recorded that he could not get in to hear the sermon, eating a meal of herrings in a pub instead.

Stillingfleet then held many preferments, including a Royal Chaplaincy, and the Deanery of St Paul's (1678), the latter involving him in work connected with the building of the new St Paul's Cathedral. He became Bishop of Worcester in 1689. He was a frequent speaker in the House of Lords, and had considerable influence as a churchman.

He supported Richard Bentley, who lived in his household as a tutor for a number of years, from shortly after his graduation in 1693. Bentley would later be his chaplain and biographer, and describe him as "one of the most universal scholars that ever lived".

In 1691, at Stillingfleet's request, Queen Mary II wrote to the magistrates of Middlesex, asking for stronger enforcement of the laws against vice. This was an early move in the campaign of the Society for the Reformation of Manners.

At his death Stillingfleet left a library of some 10,000 printed books, which were purchased by Narcissus Marsh and today are part of Marsh's Library in Dublin, Ireland. His manuscript collection was purchased by Robert Harley, 1st Earl of Oxford and Earl Mortimer (1661–1724), and passed with the Harleian Manuscripts to the British Museum in 1753 as one of the foundation collections.

== Patronage, politics and views ==
Stillingfleet had to wait many years for a bishopric, a fact linked to his disfavour at Court in the 1680s. He never, though, lacked for well-connected patrons. The first was Sir Roger Burgoyne, 2nd Baronet, a barrister and MP in the Long Parliament, in whose gift was Sutton, Bedfordshire, his living; followed by Francis Pierrepont, a Parliamentarian colonel and younger brother of Henry Pierrepont, 1st Marquess of Dorchester (a Royalist) and William Pierrepont (like Francis a Parliamentarian). These both offered him tutoring positions. He was also supported by Harbottle Grimstone, who as Master of the Rolls gave him a preaching position in the Rolls Chapel.

The transition at the Restoration was certainly problematic. Earl of Southampton presented Stillingfleet to St Andrew, Holborn. Humphrey Henchman, Bishop of London, employed him to write a vindication of William Laud's answer to John Percy (alias Fisher). According to Jon Parkin,

The apparent ease with which younger writers like Stillingfleet squared their allegiance to the restored regime, coupled with their espousal of a naturalistic, erastian and apparently Hobbesian ecclesiology, earned them the description of 'men of latitude'.

Stillingfleet was a leader within the Church of England of the "latitudinarians", the group of Anglicans thus defined pejoratively. Latitudinarism as doctrine was considered to have grown from the teaching of the Cambridge Platonists, but in practical terms conditions at the Restoration did not favour it. Quite a number of its Cambridge adherents left an unpromising career in religion for the law, or had to rely for patronage on those who had done so.

Stillingfleet was most closely associated, in his attitudes, with such as Isaac Barrow, Robert South and John Tillotson. They agreed, for example, on a literal interpretation to Biblical exegesis, discarding allegorical readings. With Tillotson he favoured the so-called Erastian view, that the ruler had great powers over the Church, from the days of 1660; after the Glorious Revolution they became Low Church moderates. With Gilbert Burnet, Benjamin Hoadly, Simon Patrick, William Powell and William Whiston, he held some High Church views also.

With Thomas Tenison, Stillingfleet and Tillotson preached on behalf of reason and natural religion. They are described as influential Arminian Anglicans. They adopted an Arminian scheme of justification in opposition to the Calvinist one, and took the stock of core beliefs to be a small set of fundamentals. In Stillingfleet's case, it supported reconciliation with Presbyterians. Stillingfleet and Tillotson

...stood for an attitude and a temper rather than for any particular creed. Though they did not abandon the objective side of religion, their emphasis was primarily on a proper moral outlook of life. They tried to meet what they believed were the greatest intellectual and ethical needs of their generation, and, in so doing, they contributed to the changing character of theology from being dogmatic to being rationalistic.

In 1674 they met with Richard Baxter and Thomas Manton, in an attempt to draft a reconciliation with the nonconformists.

They were largely sympathetic with the new science of their times. Stillingfleet did draw the line at the materialist tendency in the views of Edmond Halley, whom he examined with the help of Richard Bentley in 1691, when Halley applied for the Savilian Chair of Astronomy.

== Works ==
A keen controversialist, he wrote many treatises, with a general but learned concern to defend Anglican orthodoxy.

=== Doctrine and the Church ===
His first book was The Irenicum (1659) advocating compromise with the Presbyterians; following a Latitudinarian approach, he there shows the influence of John Selden and takes a close interest in the synagogue as a model of church structure. The philosophical basis was natural law and the state of nature. The arguments of the Irenicum were still live in the 1680s, when Gilbert Rule produced a Modest Answer.

It was followed by Origines Sacrae, Or, A Rational Account of the Grounds of Christian Faith, as to the Truth and Divine Authority of the Scriptures, and Matters Therein Contained (1662) and A Rational Account of the Grounds of Protestant Religion (1664). It included an attack on Catholicism, and Edward Meredith replied on the Catholic side. A Discourse Concerning the Idolatry Practised in the Church of Rome (1671) formed part of a controversy with the recusant Catholic Thomas Godden and noted Church scholar Serenus de Cressy.

The Mischief of Separation (1687) originally a sermon, was followed up by The Unreasonableness of Separation: Or, An Impartial Account of the History, Nature and Pleas of the Present Separation from the Communion of the Church of England (1680). These attacks on the separatists among non-conformists prompted a large-scale response from dissenters, many of whom were disappointed with the harsher line from an Anglican who had in the past held out an olive branch. His opponents included Richard Baxter and John Owen. John Howe took the line that "latitude" was not compatible with a "mean narrow" approach. Stillingfleet was also criticised from the conforming side, for coming too close to the arguments of Thomas Hobbes.

An Answer to Some Papers (1685) attempted to deal with the embarrassing publication of papers, allegedly written by the King, Charles II, arguing that one true church was that of Roman Catholicism. In the ensuing controversy, he issued A Vindication of the Answer to some Late Papers (1687) attacking John Dryden, whom he called a "grim logician". Dryden retaliated, and incorporated the "grim logician" phrase as self-description in his poem The Hind and the Panther (1687), which alludes to Stillingfleet.

=== Philosophical controversy ===
A Letter to a Deist (1677) was the first prolonged attack on deism to appear in English. It also engaged with the thought of Baruch Spinoza, in Tractatus Theologico-Politicus, though he was named only as a "late author mightily in vogue".

In 1697, Stillingfleet issued A Discourse in Vindication of the Doctrine of the Trinity (1697)

Stillingfleet's Vindication stands out among the many polemical works of the 1690s by virtue of its eirenical tone, and the breadth of learning displayed marks it off as a minor classic of seventeenth-century theology.

It had three intentions: repelling the Unitarians, shoring up the unity of the orthodox trinitarians, and doctrinal defence of the Trinity. Under the third heading, Stillingfleet took on John Locke, and his Essay on Human Understanding. He wrote Three Criticisms of Locke (1697).

Stillingfleet engaged in a debate through correspondence (later published) with Locke. He argued in favor of dualism, and claimed that Locke's Essay argued against dualism as he understood it. He also considered that the epistemology of the Essay opened the door to Unitarianism. Locke himself had taken an interest in Stillingfleet (with James Tyrrell and Sylvester Brounower) from 1681.

The controversy drew in the playwright Catherine Cockburn, who wrote in defence of Locke, but to the detriment of her career as author.

=== Antiquarian scholarship ===
Origines Sacrae (1663) began with a comprehensive analysis of flaws in ancient historians, as a way of defending the account in the Book of Genesis. It argued against the Pre-Adamite theories of Isaac La Peyrère, and took a very critical line with the older theories of ancient British origins, and the writings of Annius of Viterbo.

Another work going back to the roots was Origines Britannicae: Or, The Antiquities of the British Churches (1685).

The Discourse of the True Antiquity of London appeared in 1704 bundled with The Second Part of Ecclesiastical Cases. It was a work of high scholarship on Roman London; it however ignored the new archaeological evidence that was available but not yet in literary form.

== Notes and references ==
=== Sources ===
- Coffey, John (2006). John Goodwin and the Puritan Revolution : Religion and Intellectual Change in Seventeenth-Century England. Woodbridge: The Boydell Press.
- Cressy, Hugh Paulinus (1672). Fanaticism fanatically imputed to the Catholick church by Doctour Stillingfleet: and the imputation refuted and retorted by S.C. a Catholick. Douai: English College.
- Griffin, Martin Ignatius Joseph (1992). Latitudinarianism in the Seventeenth-Century Church of England. Leiden: E. J. Brill.

Church of England titles
Preceded by William Sancroft	Dean of St Paul's; 1678–1689	Succeeded by John Tillotson
Preceded by William Thomas	Bishop of Worcester; 1689–1699	Succeeded by William Lloyd
