= USS Meredith (DD-890) =

Gearing-class destroyer

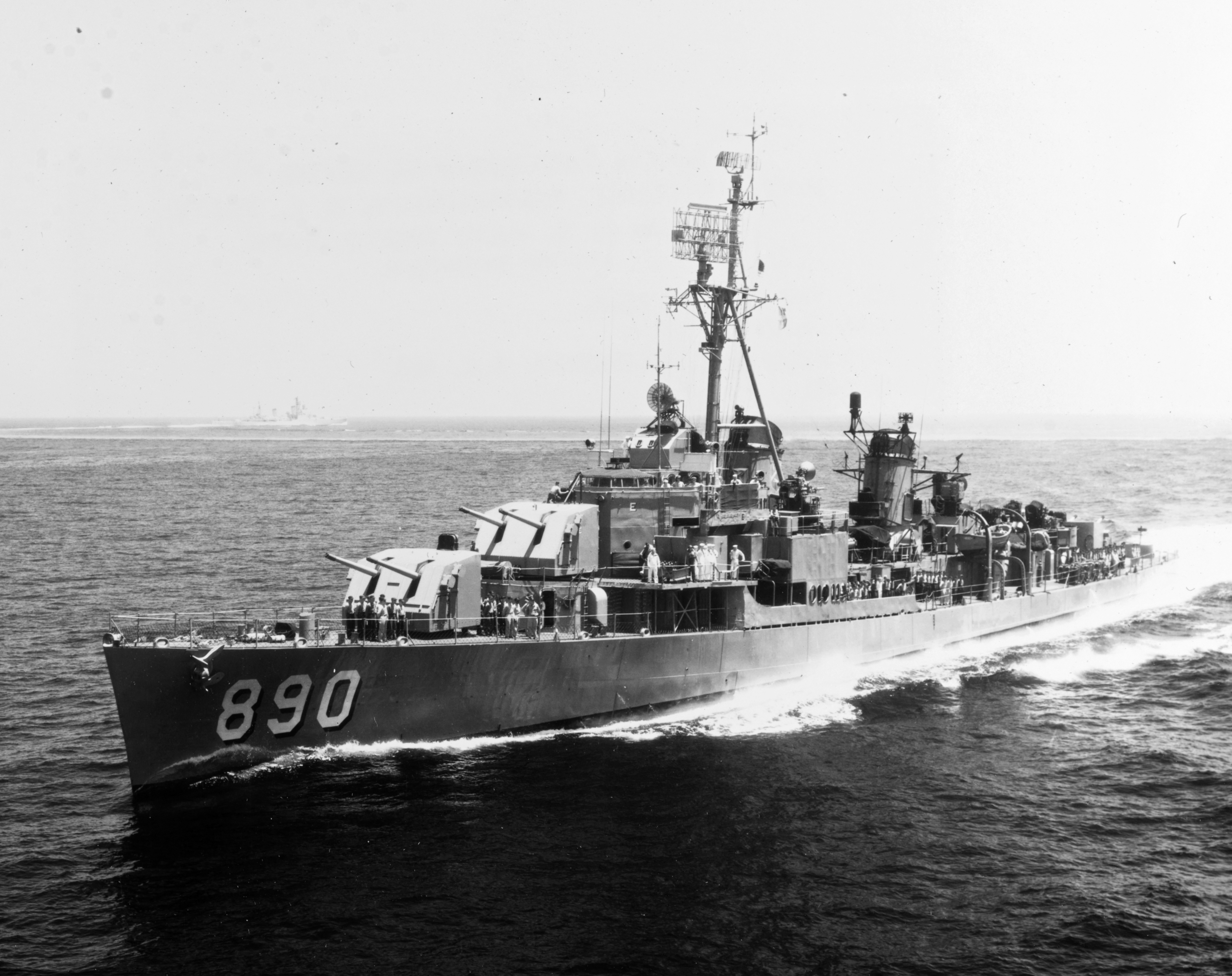
- USS Meredith, 1959

History

United States
- Name: Meredith
- Namesake: Jonathan Meredith
- Builder: Consolidated Steel Corporation, Orange, Texas
- Laid down: 27 January 1945
- Launched: 28 June 1945
- Commissioned: 31 December 1945
- Decommissioned: 29 June 1979
- Stricken: 7 December 1979
- Identification: Callsign: NBIO; Hull number: DD-890
- Fate: Transferred to Turkey, 29 June 1979
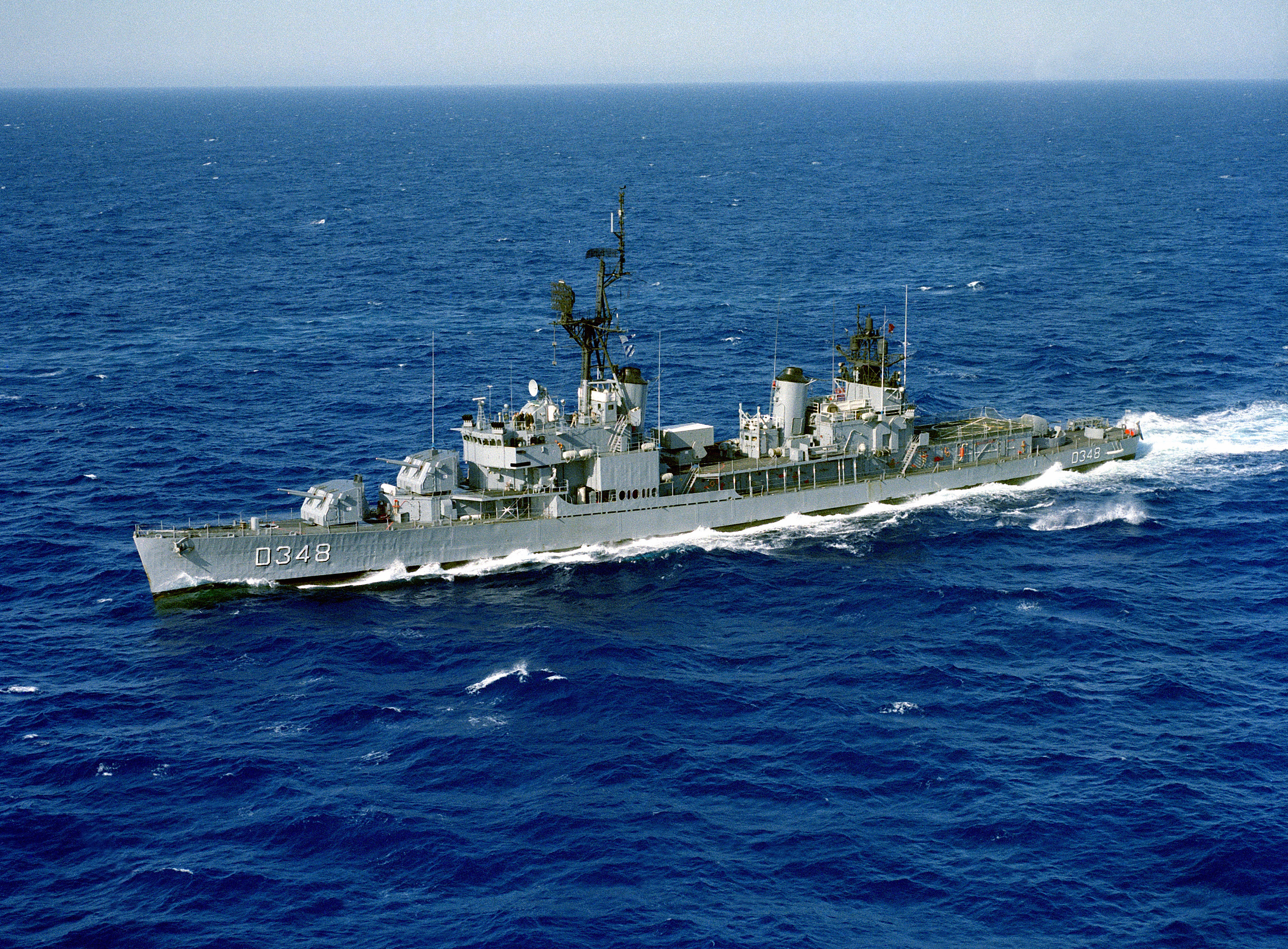
- TCG Savaştepe

Turkey
- Name: Savaştepe
- Namesake: town of Savaştepe
- Acquired: 29 June 1979
- Identification: D 348
- Fate: Scrapped, 1995

General characteristics
- Class & type: Gearing-class destroyer
- Displacement: 2,425 long tons (2,464 t)
- Length: 391 ft (119 m)
- Beam: 41 ft (12 m)
- Draft: 18 ft 6 in (5.64 m)
- Speed: 32 knots (59 km/h; 37 mph)
- Complement: 267
- Armament: 4 × 5"/38 caliber guns (3×2); 12 × 40 mm AA guns (2×4, 2×2); 11 × 20 mm AA guns (11×1); 10 × 21 inch (533 mm) torpedo tubes (2×5); 6 × depth charge projectors; 2 × depth charge tracks

USS Meredith (DD-890), a Gearing-class destroyer, was the fourth ship of the United States Navy to be named for the United States Marine Corps Sergeant Jonathan Meredith, who saved the life of Lieutenant John Trippe of Vixen, during the Barbary Wars. The destroyer was laid down at the Consolidated Steel Corporation at Orange, Texas, on 27 January 1945; launched on 28 June 1945, sponsored by Miss Juliette S. Kopper, great-great-great-grandniece of Sergeant Meredith; and commissioned on 31 December 1945.

== Service history ==
=== 1946–1952 ===
Following sea trials and shakedown exercises in the spring of 1946, Meredith was employed, for a brief period, in training submarine officers at New London, Connecticut, before steaming south to serve as plane guard for the aircraft carrier Randolph during the 1946 midshipmen summer cruise. In the late fall, she pointed her bow northward for operations off Newfoundland and Greenland. Remaining in the western Atlantic Ocean the following year, she cruised from Maine to the Caribbean, participating once again in a midshipmen training cruise. The first part of 1948 was spent in conducting experimental tests for the Operational Development Force, after which, in May, she sailed, with other ships of her squadron, Destroyer Squadron 6, for her first overseas deployment. From that time, until 1953, she got underway in the spring of each year for the Mediterranean and duty with the 6th Fleet. Her 2nd Fleet employment for the same period included Arctic maneuvers (November 1949) and several Caribbean cruises, as well as training cruises with reservists and another midshipmen summer cruise (1952).

=== 1953–1979 ===
On 7 January 1953, Meredith entered the Norfolk Naval Shipyard for habitability conversion which lasted into November. She then resumed the alternation of duty tours with the 2nd and 6th Fleets. During her 1958 overseas deployment, she served briefly with the Middle East Force as she and HMS Loch Fyne stood by in the Euphrates delta area after the Iraqi revolution of 14 July.

Toward the end of the following year, Meredith, reassigned to DesRon 14, was slated for FRAM (Fleet Rehabilitation and Modernization). Entering the Philadelphia Naval Shipyard, on 28 June 1960, she remained for a year and two days during which time her bridge was enclosed, her torpedo deck was modified to allow the installation of ASROC, and her seven-year-old 3 inch battery was replaced by a helicopter hangar and flight deck to accommodate the QH-50 DASH (Drone Anti-Submarine Helicopter) weapons system.

On 1 July 1961, the "new" Meredith sailed for her new home port, Mayport, Florida. After refresher training, she got underway for a good will tour of various ports in the Caribbean and along the west coast of Africa from Freetown, Sierra Leone, to Cape Town, Republic of South Africa. While en route she collected oceanographic data which included piscatorial and avian surveys as well as hydrologic information. Meredith returned to Mayport on 18 February 1962. She further tested and evaluated the ASROC system before heading north to embark midshipmen for the fourth time. In August 1958, the destroyer once again transited the Atlantic for oversea deployment. In November 1965, brought her into the space age with an assignment to the Project Gemini recovery operations.

=== 1965–1979 ===
1969 In the early part of the year Meredith passed through the Panama canal en route to the western pacific where she participated in the Action in the South China Sea providing coastal bombardment and plane guard service. Meredith operated in the combat zone over a six-month period.

During the WestPac tour, while en route to Australia (but short of crossing the equator) Meredith was reassigned to join what was said to be the largest task force of American war ships since World War II. The task force was assembled in response to North Korea's downing of an American aircraft. Meredith returned to Mayport in the latter part 1969.

Subsequent to the WestPac tour of 1969 Meredith once again sailed to join the United States 6th Fleet for service in the Mediterranean, after which she returned her Mayport, Fla. home port.

Meredith was decommissioned on 29 June 1979 and transferred to Turkey on the same day. She was stricken from the Naval Vessel Register on 7 December 1979.

In Turkish Navy service, she was renamed TCG Savaştepe (D 348). The ship was scrapped in 1995.
