= USS Harry E. Hubbard =

Allen M. Sumner-class destroyer

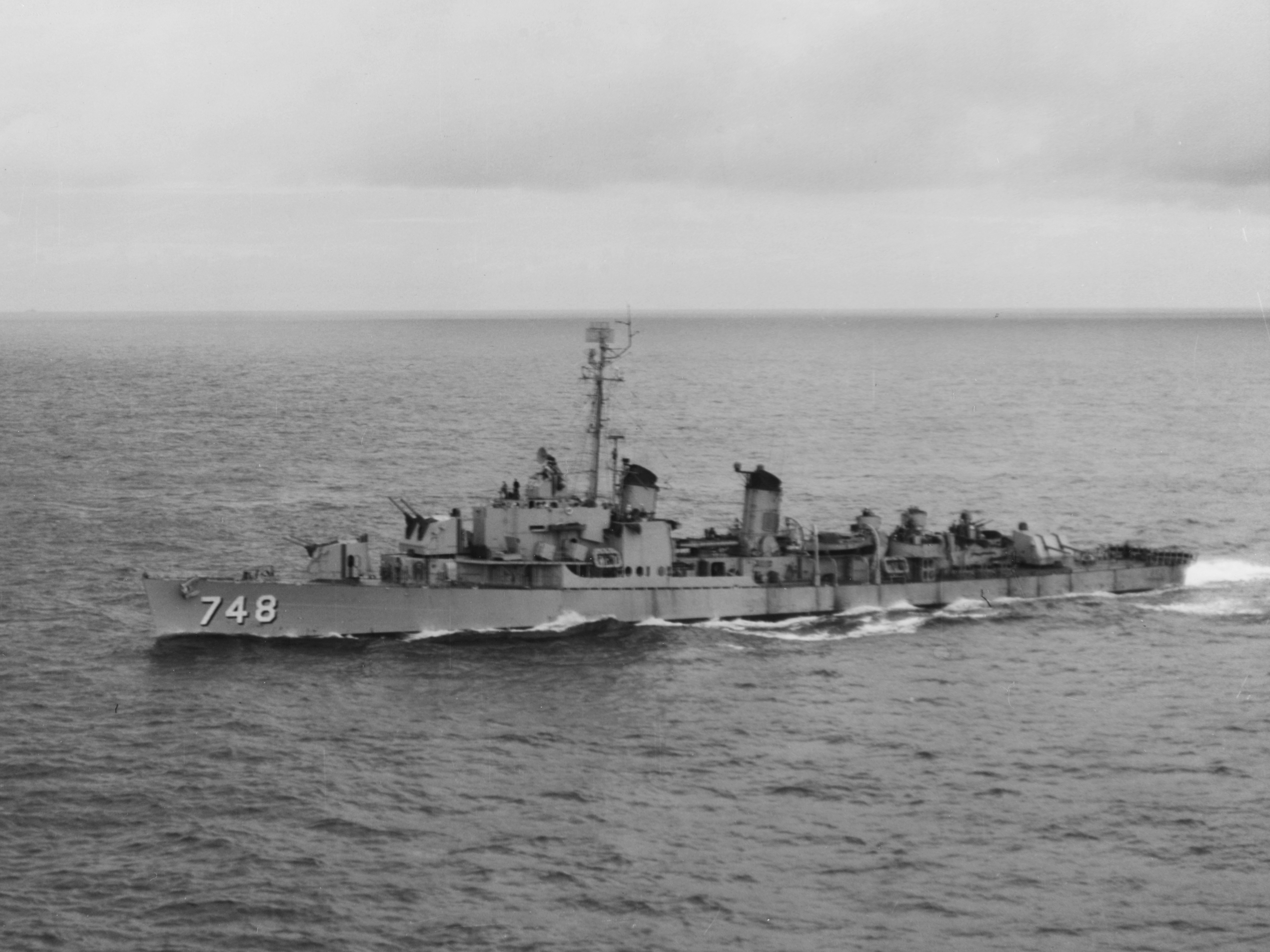
- USS Harry E. Hubbard (DD-748) underway in August 1952

History

United States
- Name: Harry E. Hubbard
- Namesake: Harry Hubbard
- Builder: Bethlehem Mariners Harbor, Staten Island, New York
- Laid down: 30 October 1943
- Launched: 24 March 1944
- Commissioned: 22 July 1944
- Decommissioned: October 1969
- Stricken: 17 October 1969
- Motto: Nomine Diem ("Name the Day")
- Fate: Sold July 1970 and broken up for scrap

General characteristics
- Class & type: Allen M. Sumner-class destroyer
- Displacement: 2,200 tons
- Length: 376 ft 6 in (114.76 m)
- Beam: 40 ft (12 m)
- Draft: 15 ft 8 in (4.78 m)
- Propulsion: 60,000 shp (45,000 kW); 2 propellers
- Speed: 34 knots (63 km/h; 39 mph)
- Range: 6,500 nmi (12,000 km; 7,500 mi) at 15 kn (28 km/h; 17 mph)
- Complement: 336
- Armament: 6 × 5 in (127 mm)/38 cal. guns, 12 × 40 mm AA guns, 11 × 20 mm AA guns, 10 × 21 inch (533 mm) torpedo tubes, 6 × depth charge projectors, 2 × depth charge tracks

USS Harry E. Hubbard (DD-748), was an Allen M. Sumner-class destroyer of the United States Navy.

== Namesake ==
Harry Enson Hubbard was born on 18 March 1903 in Baltimore, Maryland. He graduated from the United States Naval Academy in June 1925, served 3 years on the battleship USS Maryland, then qualified in submarines at New London, Connecticut. Following duty on the submarine USS S-34, he completed Naval Academy postgraduate work, then served on the submarine tender USS Holland, and, was an executive officer of the destroyer USS Twiggs. He served at the Naval Torpedo Station at Newport, Rhode Island then commanded the destroyer USS Roper from 1939 to 1940, before assignment as staff gunnery officer for destroyers in the Atlantic. The latter duty terminated 1 March 1942 when Hubbard took command of the Gleaves-class destroyer USS Meredith.

Meredith helped screen the aircraft carrier USS Hornet off Japan during the Doolittle Raid on Tokyo on 18 April 1942. Thereafter it conducted patrol and escort from Hawaii to the Samoan, Fiji, and the Solomon Islands and helped cover transports landing reinforcements on Guadalcanal on 18 September 1942. On 15 October 1942, Meredith fought against Imperial Japanese Navy carrier-based scouting planes, then fought off 18 Japanese dive bombers and 12 torpedo planes launched by the aircraft carrier Zuikaku. The ship's gunners shot down five of the attackers, and Hubbard carried on the fight though blinded by burns about his face. When his men had cleared the bridge, they abandoned the sinking Meredith moments before it sank. He died on a life raft at sea on the morning of 16 October 1942.

== Construction and commissioning ==
Harry E. Hubbard was launched on 24 March 1944 by the Bethlehem Steel Co., Staten Island, New York; sponsored by Miss Jean Hubbard, daughter; and commissioned on 22 July 1944.

== Service history ==
=== World War II ===
As flagship of Destroyer Squadron 64, Harry E. Hubbard trained precommissioning crews destined for newly constructed warships until sailing for Hawaii on 16 January 1945. She served as a training ship out of Pearl Harbor until 17 April, then departed for combat She arrived off Okinawa on 8 May 1945 to serve as a picket destroyer, guarding against the day and night waves of Japanese aerial raids and runs of kamikazes. Although the American fleet suffered losses and damage, it had come to stay. As with all previous Japanese weapons, even the kamikazes were defeated in their attempt to save this last "stepping stone" to Japan itself. For nearly two months, Harry E. Hubbard fought off the savage raiders, shooting down four kamikazes that tried to crash into her at various times.

When Evans and Hugh W. Hadley were badly damaged in their stand against some 50 kamikazes on 11 May 1945, Harry E. Hubbard, first to arrive on the scene, went alongside Evans to render fire-fighting, damage control and medical aid. She gave similar assistance to Barry on 24–25 May, shooting down two kamikazes as she escorted Barry from picket station into Kerama Retto. One enemy plane was disintegrated by Harry E. Hubbard's gunners a bare 50 yards (46 m) from the ship.

Harry E. Hubbard remained off Okinawa until 24 July 1945, then escorted occupation troops to Jinsen, Korea, and carried the Commander of Destroyer Squadron 64 (DesRon 64) to Chinkai, Korea, to oversee the demilitarization of the former Japanese naval base there. She returned to Jin-sen 7 November 1945, then based out of Tsingtao, China. She performed escort, mail, and communication service for the North China Occupation force until departing 16 March 1946, for the California seaboard. She arrived at San Francisco on 28 March 1946, underwent demobilization overhaul at Oakland, then decommissioned at San Diego on 15 January 1947. She remained in the Pacific Reserve Fleet until recommissioned 14 May 1949 but decommissioned 12 December without having gone to sea.

=== Korean War ===
Following the invasion of South Korea, Harry E. Hubbard recommissioned on 27 October 1950. After initial shakedown along the coast of California, she departed San Diego on 2 January 1951 for two months of training in Hawaiian waters. She then steamed to assist the United Nations Forces in Korea. Besides helping guard the fast carrier task force making repeated airstrikes against the enemy, she frequently joined in gunstrike missions to bombard coastal rail and communication centers and performed as seagoing artillery to support the advance of land troops. Her bombardment missions were conducted against targets at Yongdae Gap, Wonsan, Songjin, Chingjin, Kyoto, Ohako, Bokuko, Chuminjin, and other enemy strongholds of supply and reinforcement. When Walke was heavily damaged by an underwater explosion off Wonson 11 June 1951, Harry E. Hubbard, with the same skill as off Okinawa in 1945, moved in to render effective medical and damage control assistance. She returned to the California coast in October 1951 for overhaul and completed a similar tour of duty with the 7th Fleet off Korea July to December 1952. She returned to San Diego in January 1953 but again departed on 11 July to guard fast carrier task groups patrolling after the Armistice Agreement was signed in Korea. Intervened by patrol in the Taiwan Straits, this duty continued until 13 January 1954. She returned to San Diego for overhaul and refresher training along the western seaboard.

Harry E. Hubbard departed San Diego 11 August 1954 on the first of nine additional Far East tours with the 7th Fleet which were completed by the close of 1966. During this service, she joined the roving 7th Fleet 6 to 13 February 1955 in moving in under Chinese Communist artillery defenses to cover the evacuation of Chinese Nationalist from untenable positions on the Tachen Islands. In May 1955, she participated in "Operation WIGWAM", an underwater nuclear test approximately 500 miles southwest of San Diego, California. In October to November 1956 she diverted from Australia to the "Dewline" in the Northern Pacific to serve on picket patrol during the Suez Crisis. She next joined in combined warfare exercises with SEATO Treaty nations to improve readiness in defending freedom in that part of the world. From time to time, she patrolled the Taiwan Straits to insure Taiwan was not threatened from the Communist mainland of China. She was off Guam in June 1960, twice guarding the flight of President Dwight D. Eisenhower's aircraft during his Far East visit.

=== Vietnam War ===
During the Gulf of Tonkin Incident of August 1964, Harry E. Hubbard was nearby in the South China Sea screening Ticonderoga. The carrier task group struck to destroy North Vietnamese torpedo boats and their supporting facilities. In awarding the Navy Unit Commendation to Ticonderoga and her screen, Secretary of the Navy Paul Nitze stated that they had "demonstrated the firm intent of the United States to maintain freedom of the seas and to take all necessary measures in defense of peace in Southeast Asia."

Harry E. Hubbard returned to Long Beach on 28 October 1964 for a year of warfare readiness operations along the western seaboard. In October 1965, she departed for the coast of South Vietnam. In company with Valley Forge in November and December 1965, she provided gunfire support for two Marine amphibious landings. In the following months, she acted as escort to Kitty Hawk and Hancock during their strike operations in the South China Sea, acting as Harbor Defense ship at Da Nang and fired more than 1,000 rounds of exploding 5-inch shells into Viet Cong strongholds along the South Vietnamese coast. She returned to Long Beach, California, on 7 April 1966. The destroyer had drawn nationwide attention on 10 March 1966 when the ABC Television Network included scenes of one of her shore bombardments along the South Vietnamese coast.

Harry E. Hubbard served two more tours in Vietnam from April to August 1967 and from August 1968 to January 1969.

== Fate ==
Harry E. Hubbard was decommissioned and struck on 17 October 1969.

== Awards ==
- Combat Action Ribbon with two gold stars
- Navy Unit Commendation
- Asiatic–Pacific Campaign Medal with one battle star
- World War II Victory Medal
- Navy Occupation Medal with "ASIA" clasp
- China Service Medal
- National Defense Service Medal with star
- Korean Service Medal with five battle stars
- Armed Forces Expeditionary Medal with two stars
- Vietnam Service Medal with seven campaign stars
- Korean Presidential Unit Citation
- United Nations Korea Medal
- Korean War Service Medal (South Korea)
- Republic of Vietnam Campaign Medal

Harry E. Hubbard shared in the Navy Unit Commendation awarded Task Group 77.5 for support operations in the Gulf of Tonkin 2–5 August 1964.
