= USS Meredith (DD-434) =

Gleaves-class destroyer

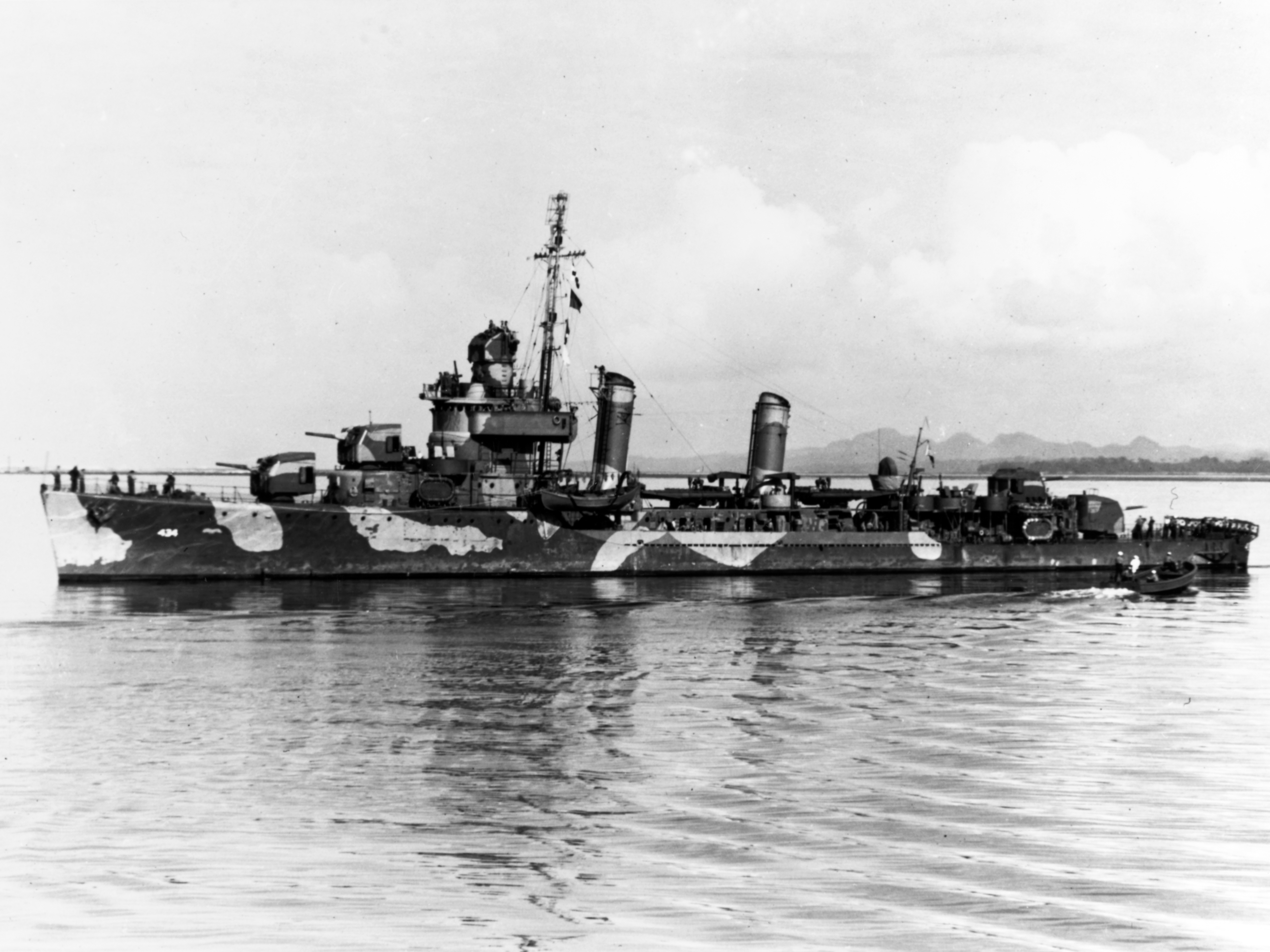
- USS Meredith at Suva, Fiji Islands, 23 June 1942, in dazzle camouflage.

History

United States
- Name: Meredith
- Namesake: Jonathan Meredith
- Builder: Boston Navy Yard
- Laid down: 1 June 1939
- Launched: 24 April 1940
- Commissioned: 1 March 1941
- Honours and awards: 1 × battle star
- Fate: Sunk by Japanese aircraft, 15 October 1942

General characteristics
- Class & type: Gleaves-class destroyer
- Displacement: 1,630 tons
- Length: 348 ft 3 in (106.15 m)
- Beam: 36 ft 1 in (11.00 m)
- Draft: 11 ft 10 in (3.61 m)
- Propulsion: 50,000 shp (37,000 kW); 4 boilers; 2 propellers
- Speed: 37.4 kn (69.3 km/h; 43.0 mph)
- Range: 6,500 nmi (12,000 km; 7,500 mi) at 12 kn (22 km/h; 14 mph)
- Complement: 208
- Armament: 5 × 5 in (127 mm)/38 cal guns, 6 × Oerlikon 20 mm cannons, 6 × 0.50 in (12.7 mm) machine guns, 10 × 21 in (533 mm) torpedo tubes, 2 × depth charge tracks

USS Meredith (DD-434), a Gleaves-class destroyer, was the second ship of the United States Navy to be named for Jonathan Meredith, a United States Marine Corps sergeant who served during the First Barbary War.

Meredith was laid down 1 June 1939 by Boston Naval Shipyard and launched 24 April 1940, sponsored by Miss Ethel Dixon Meredith. The ship was commissioned on 1 March 1941.

== Service history ==
=== Atlantic ===
Following shakedown in Cuban waters, Meredith returned to Boston on 8 June 1941 and was assigned to Destroyer Division 22. Departing Boston on 6 July, she engaged in patrol duty, exercises, and flight operations along the southern coast until 20 September. From 28 September to 31 January 1942, Meredith was based at Hvalfjörður, Iceland, where she patrolled between Iceland and the Denmark Straits. On 17 October 1941, she rescued survivors of torpedoed British steamer Empire Wave.

Following the attack on Pearl Harbor, Meredith engaged in escort and antisubmarine patrol between Iceland and the Denmark Straits, until she departed Halfjordur late in January, escorting a convoy to Boston. She sailed from Boston for Norfolk, Virginia on 18 February 1942, screening the battleship Washington, and there joined the aircraft carrier Hornet in Task Force 18 (TF 18).

=== Pacific ===
The force left Norfolk 4 March on a mission as secret as it was important, passed through the Panama Canal, and reached San Diego on 21 March. Departing San Francisco on 2 April, the force rendezvoused with TF 16, 13 April and sailed for the famous Doolittle Raid on Tokyo. On 18 April, the United States Army bombers were launched for this first carrier-based attack on Japan, and Meredith made course for Hawaii, arriving 25 April.

Between 13 May and 21 June Meredith escorted fleet oilers bound for New Caledonia, patrolled off Bulari Passage (a break in the reefs on the approach to Nouméa, New Caledonia), and escorted Tangier to Pearl Harbor. Following gunnery and tactical practice, Meredith departed Pearl Harbor on 15 August 1942 for Samoa, arriving Pago Pago 30 August. Meredith next escorted Transport Force 2 to the Solomon Islands with reinforcements landed on Guadalcanal 20 September, then sailed for patrol duty in the New Hebrides.

Departing Espiritu Santo on 12 October 1942, Meredith, now commanded by Commander Harry E. Hubbard, was underway as part of a convoy with Alchiba, Bellatrix, Jamestown, Nicholas, and Vireo, each pulling a barge carrying barrels of aviation gasoline and 500-pound bombs to the United States forces on Guadalcanal. Two days later it was learned that a Japanese carrier task force was in the vicinity and all ships except Meredith and Vireo turned back. Despite the fact that Meredith was equipped only with surface-search and not air-search radar, Commander Hubbard decided to press on to deliver the critically needed aviation gas.

Meredith was sighted by a Japanese patrol plane on the morning of 15 October, and shortly after midday took aboard the 68-man crew of Vireo to depart the area at high speed. However, while preparing to torpedo Vireo to keep her out of Japanese hands, Meredith was attacked by a force of 38 bombers, torpedo planes, and escort fighters from Zuikaku. In the first three minutes of the attack, Meredith was struck by a bomb that exploded beneath her bridge, destroying all communications, steering control, and gun direction. A second bomb struck the forward port side, and a torpedo exploded below the ready ammunition locker, igniting the ship's pyrotechnics and setting fire to fuel oil leaking from her bunkers.

Meredith fought fiercely, and brought down three of her attackers, but she was struck by an estimated 14 bombs and seven torpedoes. Meredith rolled over and sank in 10 minutes at 11°53′S 163°20′E. Of the crew of 273 on board that day, only eight officers and 73 enlisted men survived the attack and the three ensuing days of exposure to the open sea, sharks, and brief fire from Japanese planes until they were rescued by Grayson, Seminole and Gwin. Six members of Meredith's crew managed to swim to Vireo, and were rescued by a naval PBY Catalina flying boat on 19 October.

== Awards ==
Meredith received one battle star for World War II service.
