= Veterans for Britain =

- Abbreviation: VfB
- Formation: March 2016
- Type: Political pressure group
- Purpose: To promote UK defence sovereignty and argue for leaving the EU on security grounds
- Region served: United Kingdom
- Key people: Julian Thompson, Roger Lane-Nott, Gwythian Prins, Lee Rotherham, Jonathon Riley, Tim Cross, Richard Kemp, Lord Guthrie
- Website: veteransforbritain.uk

Veterans for Britain (VfB) is a pro-Brexit organisation opposing British involvement in the Common Security and Defence Policy of the European Union (EU).

== Formation ==
It was formed in 2016 in the context of the referendum of that year on the United Kingdom's membership of the EU. It has had links to the Vote Leave campaigning organisation from which it received a donation.

Veterans for Britain was set up “to put forward the Defence and Security arguments for the UK to vote to leave the European Union”.

== Membership ==
Veterans for Britain has attracted the support of senior figures with a military background. Supporters listed on its website have included Charles Guthrie, Baron Guthrie of Craigiebank, retired Chief of the Defence Staff.

== Policies ==
Veterans for Britain takes the view that it retains an important role after the membership referendum. The organisation is pro-NATO and opposed to UK involvement in the EU's new political initiatives in defence, on which it attempts to raise awareness. It is opposed to UK involvement in EU policies on defence procurement, which they say work against the notion of cross-border access to defence contracts and instead create a protectionist EU market for defence, expanding the regulatory and financial role of the EU in defence industry and procurement, while tying both of those to the EU's expanding military policy.

In September 2020, Veterans for Britain appointed solicitor Hilary Meredith, known for her legal work on behalf of armed forces personnel, to its board. The move aligned with the group's growing involvement in cases concerning the prosecution of veterans for actions during military service.

== Post‑Brexit ==
After 2016, the group repositioned itself as a small policy and advocacy organisation focusing on defence sovereignty and veterans' affairs. It directed much of its attention to EU defence integration, warning that UK participation in emerging European defence structures such as the Permanent Structured Cooperation (PESCO), the European Defence Fund (EDF) and the European Defence Agency (EDA) could limit Britain's strategic autonomy after Brexit.

VfB produced a series of policy briefings and co-authored longer analytical studies, including Nouvelle Vague: An Audit of EU Defence Union Plans (Rotherham & Thompson, 2020), which examined the evolution of the EU's common security and defence policy and its implications for NATO. The group's papers mixed defence analysis with advocacy for UK strategic autonomy.

In January 2019, two prominent VfB associates – former MI6 chief Sir Richard Dearlove and former Chief of the Defence Staff Lord Guthrie – publicly urged Conservative association chairs to oppose Theresa May's Brexit withdrawal agreement on national-security grounds.

== openDemocracy investigation ==
In December 2017, openDemocracy published an investigation into Veterans for Britain. According to openDemocracy, behind the public image of a grassroots veterans' movement, the organisation brought together a network of senior military figures, lobbyists, business interests and donors involved in the Brexit campaign. The outlet described it as part of a wider establishment network linking defence and intelligence circles with political and financial actors supporting the United Kingdom's withdrawal from the European Union.

According to filings with the Electoral Commission, Veterans for Britain received £100,000 from the official Vote Leave Ltd campaign in May 2016 and spent the same amount on services provided by the Canadian data analytics firm AggregateIQ, which handled online advertising and voter targeting. Similar payments were made through BeLeave, and both transfers went to the same contractor, suggesting coordination between formally independent campaigns and a possible attempt to circumvent the £7 million legal spending limit. The link between Vote Leave and Veterans for Britain was Lee Rotherham, who served as Vote Leave's Director of Special Projects and later became VfB's Executive Director. Aside from the £100,000 from Vote Leave, VfB declared only one other major donation—£50,000 from Arron Banks's company Better for the Country Ltd, which was itself the subject of a separate investigation into the origin of its funds and possible overseas involvement.

The openDemocracy report stated that the organisation's advisory board included senior officers and intelligence figures with interests in the private defence, data and resource sectors. Members named in the report included Field Marshal Charles Guthrie, former Chief of the Defence Staff, who in 2017 joined the private intelligence firm Arcanum as senior adviser to its chairman. Arcanum was described by the Financial Times as a company providing "bespoke strategic intelligence services" to governments and corporations. Guthrie also held shares in Palantir Technologies, a US data-analytics company co-founded by billionaire Peter Thiel, an early investor in Facebook and supporter of Donald Trump. Palantir was later reported to have been linked to digital campaigning operations in both the Brexit and US presidential elections. The board also included Professor Gwythian Prins, an emeritus academic at the London School of Economics and former adviser to the Charity Commission, who had previously been associated with the climate-sceptic Global Warming Policy Foundation and several eurosceptic think tanks.

== See also ==
- Political funding in the United Kingdom
