= USS Meredith (DD-165) =

Wickes-class destroyer

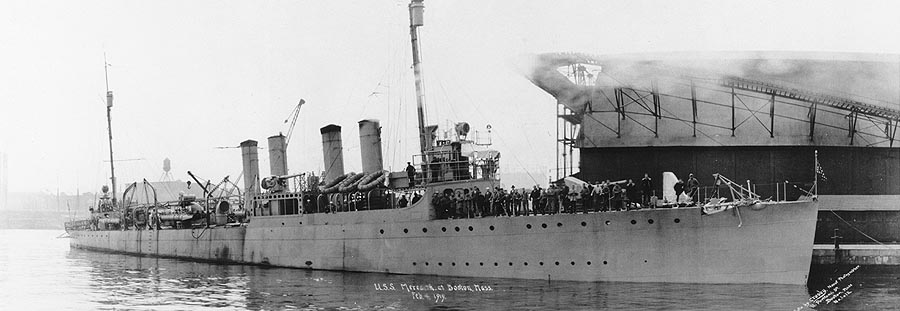
- USS Meredith (DD-165)

History

United States
- Namesake: Jonathan Meredith
- Builder: Fore River Shipbuilding Company, Quincy, Massachusetts
- Laid down: 26 June 1918
- Launched: 22 September 1918
- Commissioned: 29 January 1919
- Decommissioned: 28 June 1922
- Stricken: 7 January 1936
- Fate: Sold for scrapping 29 September 1936

General characteristics
- Class & type: Wickes-class destroyer
- Displacement: 1,202–1,208 long tons (1,221–1,227 t) (standard); 1,295–1,322 long tons (1,316–1,343 t) (deep load)
- Length: 314 ft 4 in (95.8 m)
- Beam: 30 ft 11 in (9.42 m)
- Draught: 9 ft 10 in (3.0 m)
- Installed power: 27,000 shp (20,000 kW); 4 water-tube boilers
- Propulsion: 2 shafts, 2 steam turbines
- Speed: 35 knots (65 km/h; 40 mph) (design)
- Range: 2,500 nautical miles (4,600 km; 2,900 mi) at 20 knots (37 km/h; 23 mph) (design)
- Complement: 6 officers, 108 enlisted men
- Armament: 4 × single 4-inch (102 mm) guns; 2 × single 1-pounder AA guns; 4 × triple 21 inch (533 mm) torpedo tubes; 2 × depth charge rails

USS Meredith (DD-165) was a Wickes-class destroyer built for the United States Navy during World War I. She was the first destroyer in the United States Navy that named for a Marine.

== Description ==
The Wickes class was an improved and faster version of the preceding Caldwell-class. Two different designs were prepared to the same specification that mainly differed in the turbines and boilers used. The ships built to the Bethlehem Steel design, built in the Fore River and Union Iron Works shipyards, mostly used Yarrow boilers that deteriorated badly during service and were mostly scrapped during the 1930s. The ships displaced 1,202–1,208 long tons (1,221–1,227 t) at standard load and 1,295–1,322 long tons (1,316–1,343 t) at deep load. They had an overall length of 314 feet 4 inches (95.8 m), a beam of 30 feet 11 inches (9.4 m) and a draught of 9 feet 10 inches (3.0 m). They had a crew of 6 officers and 108 enlisted men.

Performance differed radically between the ships of the class, often due to poor workmanship. The Wickes class was powered by two steam turbines, each driving one propeller shaft, using steam provided by four water-tube boilers. The turbines were designed to produce a total of 27,000 shaft horsepower (20,000 kW) intended to reach a speed of 35 knots (65 km/h; 40 mph). The ships carried 225 long tons (229 t) of fuel oil which was intended gave them a range of 2,500 nautical miles (4,600 km; 2,900 mi) at 20 knots (37 km/h; 23 mph).

The ships were armed with four 4-inch (102 mm) guns in single mounts and were fitted with two 1-pounder guns for anti-aircraft defense. Their primary weapon, though, was their torpedo battery of a dozen 21 inch (533 mm) torpedo tubes in four triple mounts. In many ships a shortage of 1-pounders caused them to be replaced by 3-inch (76 mm) anti-aircraft (AA) guns. They also carried a pair of depth charge rails. A "Y-gun" depth charge thrower was added to many ships.

== Construction and career ==
Meredith, named for Jonathan Meredith, was laid down 26 June 1918 by Fore River Shipbuilding Company, Quincy, Massachusetts; launched 22 September 1918; sponsored by Mrs. William F. Meredith, wife of the great-grandnephew of Sergeant Meredith; and commissioned at Boston 29 January 1919. Assigned to Destroyer Force, Atlantic Fleet, Meredith proceeded to Newport, Rhode Island, for torpedoes and 18 February began a shakedown cruise to Cuba. However, she received orders 22 February to join five other destroyers as escort to George Washington, returning President Woodrow Wilson from France to Boston. On 26 February, she resumed her shakedown.

Meredith departed New York 1 May for Trepassey Bay, Newfoundland, to serve as a guide post for the first transoceanic flight, as Navy Curtis flying boats spanned the Atlantic from Long Island to Plymouth, England. Returning to Boston 22 May, Meredith cruised the east and gulf coasts with Destroyer Flotilla 2 until November, then served out of Newport for training, particularly target practice, until November, when she went into repair at Norfolk.

Rejoining her division at Charleston, South Carolina, 26 January 1922, she participated in maneuvers until 5 April when she went into Philadelphia Navy Yard for inactivation. Decommissioned 28 June 1922, Meredith remained at Philadelphia until, in accordance with the London Naval Treaty, she was sold for scrapping 29 September 1936.
