= USS Meredith (DD-726) =

Allen M. Sumner-class destroyer

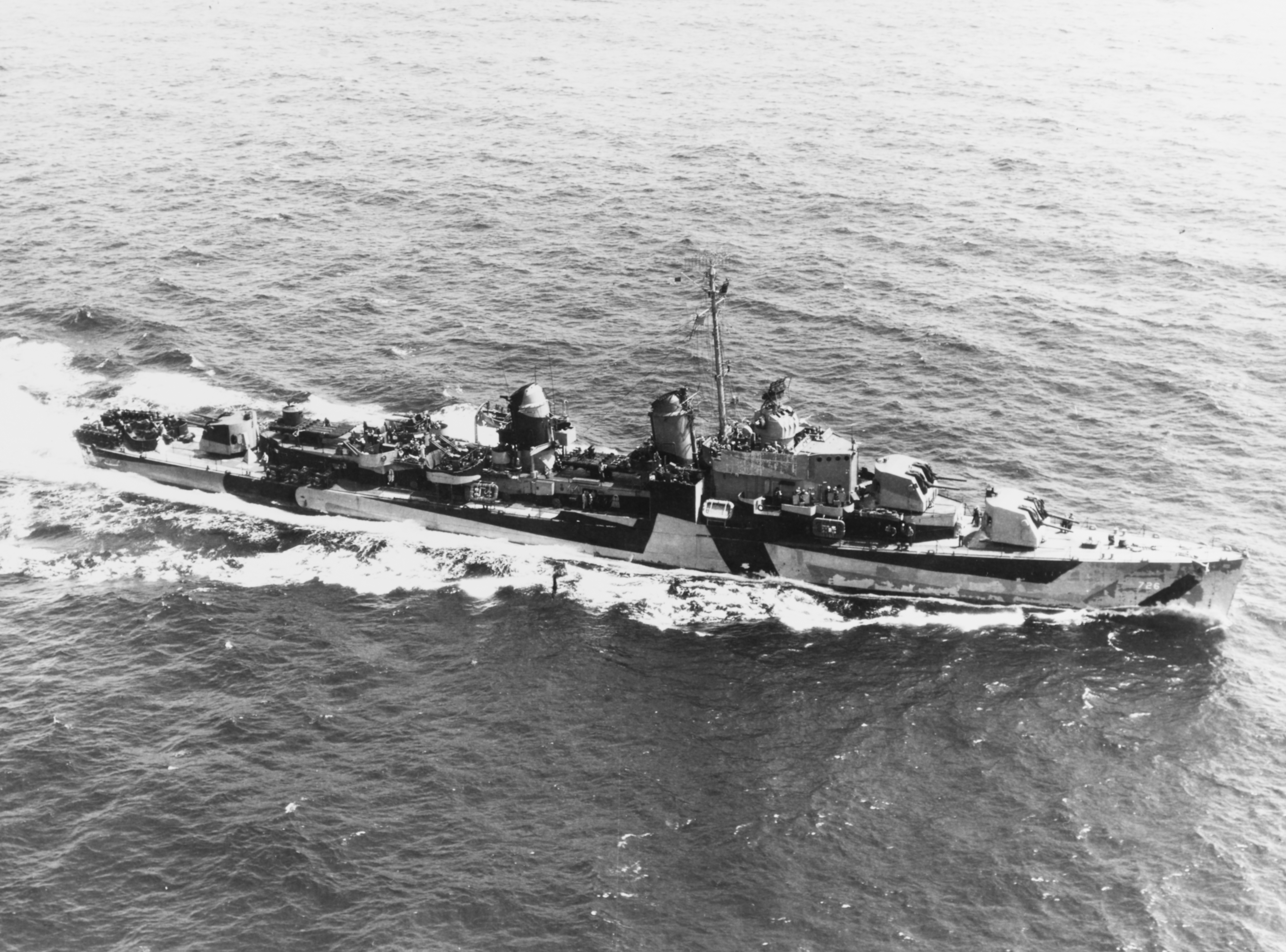
- USS Meredith (DD-726) Seen here at sea, 16 April 1944.

History

United States
- Namesake: Jonathan Meredith
- Ordered: 1942
- Builder: Bath Iron Works
- Laid down: 26 July 1943
- Launched: 21 December 1943
- Commissioned: 14 March 1944
- Fate: Sunk 9 June 1944, sold and scrapped 5 August 1960

General characteristics
- Class & type: Allen M. Sumner-class destroyer
- Displacement: 2,200 tons
- Length: 376 ft 6 in (114.8 m)
- Beam: 40 ft (12.2 m)
- Draft: 15 ft 8 in (4.8 m)
- Propulsion: 60,000 shp (45 MW); 2 propellers
- Speed: 34 knots (63 km/h)
- Range: 6500 nm @ 15 kn (12,000 km @ 28 km/h)
- Complement: 336
- Armament: 6 × 5 in (130 mm)/38 guns, 12 × 40 mm AA guns, 11 × 20 mm AA guns, 10 × 21 inch (533 mm) torpedo tubes, 6 × depth charge projectors, 2 × depth charge tracks

USS Meredith (DD-726), an Allen M. Sumner-class destroyer, was the third ship of the United States Navy to be named for Jonathan Meredith, a Marine sergeant who saved the life of Lieutenant John Trippe of Vixen, during the Barbary Wars.

Meredith was laid down on 26 July 1943 by Bath Iron Works Corporation, Bath, Maine; launched on 21 December 1943, sponsored by Mrs. William Kopper; and commissioned on 14 March 1944.

== Service history ==
After shakedown off Bermuda, Meredith departed Boston on 8 May 1944 as an escort in a convoy, arriving Plymouth, England, on the 27th. Between 5 and 6 June, she served as escort to transports assembling for the Normandy invasion. On 6 June, Meredith gave gunfire support to the landing forces on Utah Beach. Early in the morning of the following day, while patrolling the offshore waters as a screening vessel, she struck a mine. Severely damaged, with a loss of seven killed and over 50 wounded and missing, Meredith was towed to an anchorage in the Baie de la Seine to be salvaged. However, on the morning of 9 June, her seams were further opened by an enemy bombing raid and shortly after she broke in two without warning and sank. Bates rescued 163 survivors.

On 5 August 1960, the sunken hulk was sold to St. Française de Recherches of France. The hulk of the Meredith was raised and scrapped in September 1960.

== Awards ==
Meredith received one battle star for World War II service.
