= Meredith Kazer =

Meredith Wallace Kazer is a professor of nursing and dean of the Marion Peckham Egan School of Nursing and Health Studies at Fairfield University.

== Career ==
An associate professor of nursing at the Yale University School of Nursing in New Haven, Connecticut, Kazer co-edited Prostate Cancer: Nursing Assessment, Management, and Care (Springer Publishing Co. 2002) with Lorrie L. Powel, Ph.D., RN, a research health scientist at Boston University School of Public Health. The American Journal of Nursing awarded the book one of its prestigious book awards.

In March 2015, test preparation company Mometrix named Kazer the tenth most influential nursing dean in the country. In 2018, she received the Connecticut League for Nursing's Presidential Award.

In 2020, Kazer was named to the Bridgeport Hospital Board of Trustees.

== Education ==
She earned a Bachelor of Science of Nursing from Boston University, a Master of Science of Nursing from Yale University and a Ph.D. of Nursing Research and Theory Development from New York University.

== Publications ==
- Kazer, Meredith Wallace (October 22, 2007). Essentials of Gerontological Nursing. Springer Publishing Company. ISBN 978-0-8261-2053-3.
- Kazer, Meredith Wallace; Grossman, Sheila C. (January 19, 2011). Gerontological Nurse Practitioner Certification Review. Springer Publishing Company. ISBN 978-0-8261-0643-8.
- Kazer, Meredith Wallace; Neal-Boylan, Leslie (November 15, 2011). Case Studies in Gerontological Nursing for the Advanced Practice Nurse. Wiley. ISBN 978-0-8138-2378-2.
