= Hilary Meredith =

Hilary Meredith is an English solicitor, professor and lobbyist known for her work and advocacy for UK armed forces service personnel and their families.

In 1987, Meredith came to public attention after winning the first-ever case against the Ministry of Defence following a change in the law that made the department potentially liable. She represented the widow of a soldier who had been killed during training exercises in Canada.

She started Hilary Meredith Solicitors in Wilmslow, a legal firm in 2003, specializing in campaigning for the armed forces. Prior to founding the practice, Meredith spent over 17 years at the Manchester-based law firm Donns, where she served as managing partner during her final five years.

Meredith has been known for a series of cases concerning the MoD’s duty of care. She has been involved in Parliamentary Defence Select Sub-Committee Inquiries providing evidence regarding military training exercises.

From 2016, she was appointed senior lecturer of Law and Veterans Affairs at Chester University, serving on the board of the University’s Steering Committee for the Westminster Centre for Veterans Wellbeing and Care. In 2017, she also became a Visiting Professor at the University of Chester.

In September 2020, Meredith was appointed to the board of Veterans for Britain, a policy group advocating for UK defence sovereignty and the interests of military veterans.

== Veterans advocacy ==
Since 1987, Meredith-Beckham and her Cheshire-based law firm have acted in over 1,300 legal cases against the Ministry of Defence, securing more than £221 million in compensation.

In the 2020s, Hilary Meredith led a large-scale class action against the UK Ministry of Defence (MoD) on behalf of 450 former service personnel who alleged harm from the anti-malarial drug Lariam (mefloquine), which had been prescribed to more than 20,000 British troops over a 20-year period. Developed by the US Army in the 1970s, the drug was associated with severe psychiatric side effects, including hallucinations, psychosis, and suicidal ideation, reportedly affecting up to 12% of users.

Her law firm pursued the litigation under a conditional ("no win, no fee") agreement, absorbing nearly £10 million in costs over nine years. The prolonged legal battle, which the MoD repeatedly delayed, forced the firm to take on significant debt and brought it close to bankruptcy. As of 2024, the MoD was expected to pay more than £20 million in compensation related to the case.

=== Notable cases ===
Meredith's work has included:

- Green v MoD - against the Ministry of Defence following the Repeal of S10 Crown Proceedings (Armed Forces) Act 1947.
- Sharp v Ministry of Defence - [2007] EWCA Civ 1223.
- Markey v MoD - military boxing match resulting in brain injury.
- Maloney Dickinson v MoD – husband drowned whilst abseiling.
- Susan Johnson v MoD - husband killed when flare exploded in his mouth.
- Shaun Fowler v MoD – severe head injury sustained whilst taking part in riot training in Spandau.
- Judicial Review of the Legal Aid Board Multi Party Committee 1997.
- John Oral v MoD – Gulf War 1, hit by landmine.

== Personal life ==
In December 2021, Meredith married Ted Beckham, the father of footballer David Beckham. It was the second marriage for both. The couple had met at a charity event for army veterans and became engaged in March 2020, shortly before the COVID-19 pandemic began.
