= Charles Meredith =

Charles Meredith may refer to:

- Charles Meredith (politician) (1811–1880), politician in colonial Tasmania, Australia
- Charles Meredith (banker) (1854–1928), Canadian banker
- Charles Meredith (actor) (1894–1964), American actor
- Sir Charles Warburton Meredith (1896−1977), British Royal Air Force officer

== See also ==
- Charles Meredyth (disambiguation)
