= Merry Lindsey =

American cardiac physiologist

- Born: Florida, US

Academic background
- Education: BA, Boston University; PhD, cardiovascular sciences, 1999, Baylor College of Medicine
- Thesis: MMP 9 expression and activation following myocardial ischemia/reperfusion (1999)

Academic work
- Institutions: University of Nebraska Medical Center; Mississippi Center for Heart Research; University of Texas Health Science Center; Medical University of South Carolina; Meharry Medical College

Merry L. Lindsey is an American cardiac physiologist. In 2022 she was named the Dean of the School of Graduate Studies at Meharry Medical College. In 2019 she was named the Stokes-Shackleford Professor and Chair of the University of Nebraska Medical Center Department of Cellular and Integrative Physiology and the director of the Center for Heart and Vascular Research. In 2021, Lindsey was appointed editor-in-chief of the American Journal of Physiology. Heart and Circulatory Physiology.

== Early life and education ==
Lindsey was born Stuart, Florida in 1970 and raised in South Florida, where she attended South Fork High School. Following high school, Lindsey earned her undergraduate degree in biology from Boston University and her PhD in cardiovascular sciences from Baylor College of Medicine.

== Career ==
Upon completing her PhD, Lindsey worked at the Medical University of South Carolina as an assistant professor before joining the faculty at the University of Texas Health Science Center. In 2019, she left the Mississippi Center for Heart Research to accept an appointment as the Stokes-Shackleford Professor and Chair of the Department of Cellular and Integrative Physiology at the University of Nebraska Medical Center. Upon joining the department, Lindsey also became the founding director of the Center for Heart and Vascular Research. She joined Meharry Medical College as the dean of the School of Graduate Studies and Research.

In 2021, Lindsey was appointed editor-in-chief of the American Journal of Physiology. Heart and Circulatory Physiology, a journal published by the American Physiological Society. She received the Vincenzo Panagia Distinguished Lecture Award from the Institute of Cardiovascular Sciences at St-Boniface Hospital Research in 2021, and the Distinguished Investigator Award from the British Society for Cardiovascular Research in 2022.
