= Meredith Shiels =

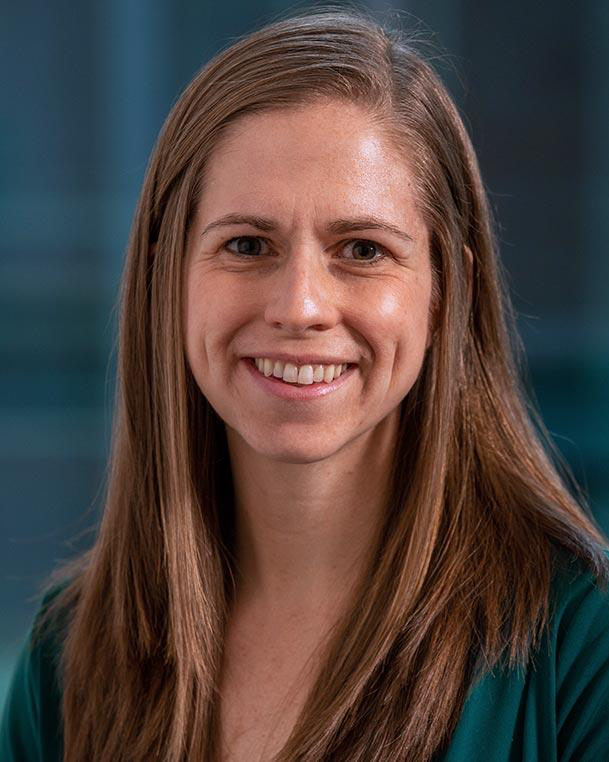
- Shiels in 2020
- Born: Meredith Sarah Shiels; May 6, 1982 (age 44); Pittsburgh, Pennsylvania, U.S.
- Education: Schreyer Honors College; Johns Hopkins Bloomberg School of Public Health
- Scientific career
- Fields: Cancer epidemiology, HIV
- Workplaces: National Cancer Institute
- Doctoral advisor: Stephen R. Cole
- Other academic advisors: Laura Cousino Klein; Anthony J. Alberg

Meredith Sarah Shiels (born May 6, 1982) is an American cancer epidemiologist who researches cancer risks in people with HIV. She is a senior investigator at the National Cancer Institute.

== Life ==
Meredith Sarah Shiels was born May 6, 1982, in Pittsburgh, Pennsylvania to Judy and Stuart Shiels. She completed a B.S. in Biobehavioral Health in 2004 from the Schreyer Honors College of Pennsylvania State University. Her honor's thesis was titled, Effects of 24-hour smoking abstinence and tobacco smoking on salivary cortisol levels and self-reported craving in men and women. Laura Cousino Klein was her advisor.

She earned a M.H.S. (2006) and Ph.D. (2009) in cancer epidemiology from the Johns Hopkins Bloomberg School of Public Health. Her master's thesis was titled, Cigarette smoking behavior in relation to variation in three genes involved in dopamine metabolism: Catechol-O-methyltransferase, Dopamine Beta-Hydroxylase and Monoamine Oxidase-A. Shiels' dissertation was titled AIDS-defining and non-AIDS-defining cancers in HIV-infected individuals. Anthony J. Alberg was her master's thesis advisor and Stephen R. Cole was her doctoral advisor. She joined the National Cancer Institute (NCI) Infections and Immunoepidemiology Branch (IIB) as a Cancer Research Training Award postdoctoral fellow in 2009, and was promoted to research fellow in 2011.

Shiels became a tenure-track investigator in 2016 and was promoted to senior investigator and awarded National Institutes of Health (NIH) scientific tenure in 2021. Her research program focuses on quantifying cancer risk and burden in people living with HIV, estimating the impact of risk factors on changing cancer rates over time, and understanding rising rates of premature mortality in the United States.
