= Maredudd =

Name list

Maredudd, also found in the form Meredydd and in other spellings, is an Old Welsh male given name, from which the Welsh name Meredith is derived. A pet form of the name was Bedo, which has also entered the English language in names such as Beddoe and Beddoes.

Below is a list of people who have borne the name.

== Maredudd ==
- Maredudd ab Ieuan ap Robert (died 1525), a landed gentleman
- Maredudd ab Owain (died c. 999), king of Deheubarth
- Maredudd ab Owain Glyndŵr (fl. late 14th – early 15th centuries), a participant in his father Owain Glyndŵr's revolt against English rule
- Maredudd ab Owain ab Edwin (died 1072), a prince of Deheubarth
- Maredudd ap Bleddyn (1047–1132), king of Powys
- Maredudd ap Cynan ab Owain Gwynedd (c. 1150 – 1212), a member of the royal house of Gwynedd
- Maredudd ap Gruffydd (1131–1155), prince of Deheubarth
- Maredudd ap Llywelyn ap Maredudd ap Cynan (died 1255), thought to have been lord of Meirionnydd
- Maredudd ap Rhobert (died 1244), lord of Cedewain
- Maredudd ap Rhys (fl. 1450 – 1485), a poet and priest
- Maredudd ap Rhys Gryg (died 1271), a prince of Deheubarth
- Maredudd ap Tewdws (died c. 797), king of Dyfed
- Maredudd ap Tudur (c. 1406), a soldier and nobleman of the family subsequently known as the Tudors

== Meredydd ==
- Meredydd Barker, a playwright
- Meredydd Evans (1919–2015), a singer and scholar of Welsh folk music; also a television producer and activist
- Meredydd Hughes, a police officer

== See also ==
- Bedo (disambiguation)
