= Samuel Meredith =

Samuel Meredith may refer to:

- Samuel Meredith (American politician) (1741–1817), American merchant and politician, Treasurer of the United States, 1789–1801
- Samuel Meredith (police officer) (1794–1873), British policeman who was the first person to be appointed to the rank of Chief Constable
- Samuel Meredith (Western Samoan politician) (1877–1936), Western Samoan politician and businessman who served in the Legislative Council, 1929–1932
- Sam Meredith (1872–1921), Welsh footballer
