= Edward Meredith =

English Jesuit

Edward Meredith (1648 – after 1715) was an English Roman Catholic controversialist.

== Life ==
He was a son of the rector of Landulph, Cornwall. He studied at Westminster School and, in 1665, was elected to a scholarship at Christ Church, Oxford. In 1668, he went to Spain as secretary of the ambassador, Sir William Godolphin, and while residing there became a Catholic.

He returned to England after three years and engaged in a religious controversy with Edward Stillingfleet (8 August 1671). In this discussion, an account of which he published in 1684, he was aided by Edward Colman, who was executed seven years later for alleged complicity in the Popish Plot.

In 1682, Meredith wrote a reply to one Samuel Johnson, who had libelled the Duke of York in a work entitled "Julian the Apostle". On 7 September 1684, he entered the Jesuit novitiate at Watten, Flanders, under the name of Langford (or Langsford).

He evidently returned in a few years to England, where he published several controversial pamphlets. On the fall of James II, he withdrew to Saint-Germain. He was resident in Rome during the years 1700 and 1701. The year of his death is uncertain, but his will, dated 1715, is said to be preserved in the archives of the English College, Rome. He translated a devotional work from the Latin under the title "A Journal of Meditations for every day of the year" (London, 1687).
