= James Meredith (Medal of Honor) =

- Born: April 11, 1872; Omaha, Nebraska, US
- Died: January 18, 1915 (aged 42)
- Burial place: Saint Marys Cemetery, Omaha, Nebraska
- Military career
- Allegiance: United States
- Branch: United States Marine Corps
- Service years: 1896–1901
- Rank: Sergeant
- Unit: USS Marblehead
- Conflicts: Spanish–American War
- Awards: Medal of Honor

Patrick F. Ford Jr. (born James Meredith; April 11, 1872 – January 18, 1915) was a private serving in the United States Marine Corps during the Spanish–American War who received the Medal of Honor for bravery.

== Biography ==
Meredith was born April 11, 1872, in Omaha, Nebraska. He joined the Marine Corps from Boston in July 1896. He officially changed his name to Patrick F. Ford, Jr. in June 1900 and was honorably discharged under that name in September 1901.

He died January 18, 1915, and is buried in Saint Marys Cemetery Omaha, Nebraska.

== Medal of Honor citation ==
Rank and organization: Private, U.S. Marine Corps. (Name changed to Patrick F. Ford, Jr ) Born: 11 April 1872, Omaha, Nebr. Accredited to: Virginia. G.O. No.: 521, 7 July 1899.

Citation:

On board the U.S.S. Marblehead during the operation of cutting the cable leading from Cienfuegos, Cuba, 11 May 1898. Facing the heavy fire of the enemy, Meredith displayed extraordinary bravery and coolness throughout this action.

== See also ==
- List of Medal of Honor recipients for the Spanish–American War
