= Jonathan Meredith =

- Born: 1772; Bucks County, Pennsylvania
- Died: August 7, 1805 (aged 32–33); Tripoli
- Military career
- Allegiance: United States of America
- Branch: United States Marine Corps
- Rank: Sergeant
- Conflicts: First Barbary War

Jonathan Meredith (about 1772 – August 7, 1805) was a United States Marine during the First Barbary War.

== Biography ==
Born in Bucks County, Pennsylvania, Meredith enlisted in the Marine Corps June 6, 1803 and was promoted to Sergeant August 1, of the same year.

During an engagement in the harbor of Tripoli August 3, 1805, Sergeant Meredith saved the life of Lieutenant John Trippe of USS Vixen, who with a party of nine men had boarded a Tripolitan ship. Heavily outnumbered, the boarding party fought a fierce hand-to-hand combat, in which Trippe was severely wounded; Meredith protected him from what would have been the final blow. Four days later Meredith was killed in the explosion of Gunboat No. 3 during a similar attack against the Tripolitans.

== Namesakes ==
See USS Meredith for ships that have been named in his honor.
